= Muskingum County Courthouse =

Local government building in the United States

- Muskingum County Courthouse And Jail
- U.S. National Register of Historic Places
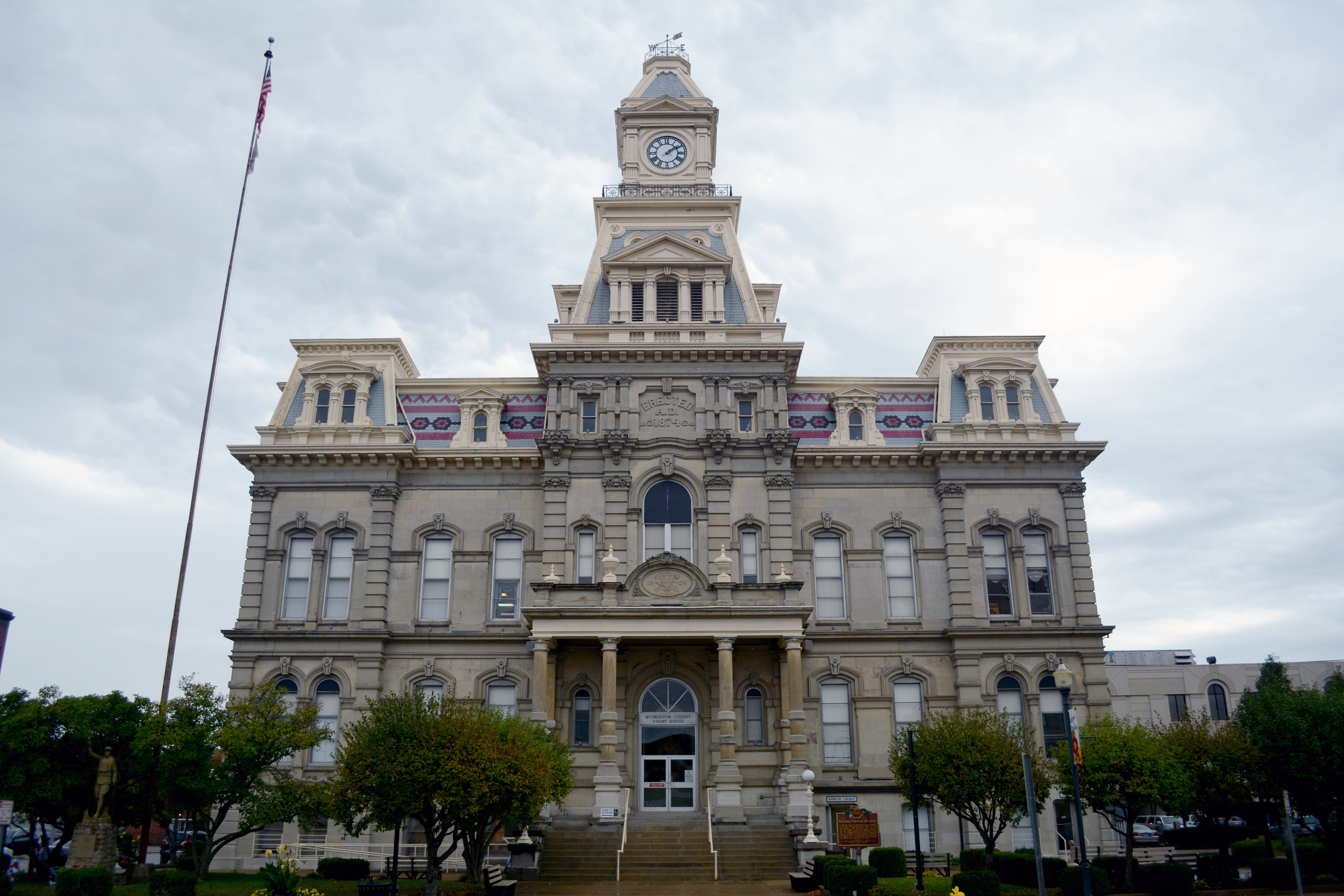
- Muskingum County Courthouse in Zanesville, Ohio

- Location within Ohio Location within the United States
- Location: 4th and Main Streets; Zanesville, Ohio
- Coordinates: 39°56′26″N 82°0′26″W
- Area: 1 acre (0.40 ha)
- Built: 1870
- Architect: H.E. Myer; T.B. Townsend
- Architectural style: Italianate
- NRHP reference No.: 73001515
- Added to NRHP: July 16, 1973

The Muskingum County Courthouse is a historic building in Zanesville, Ohio. It was designed by T.B. Townsend and H. E. Myer, and built in 1870 with stone, brick, and slate in the Second Empire architecture style. The building is listed on the National Register of Historic Places and is located at 4th and Main Streets.

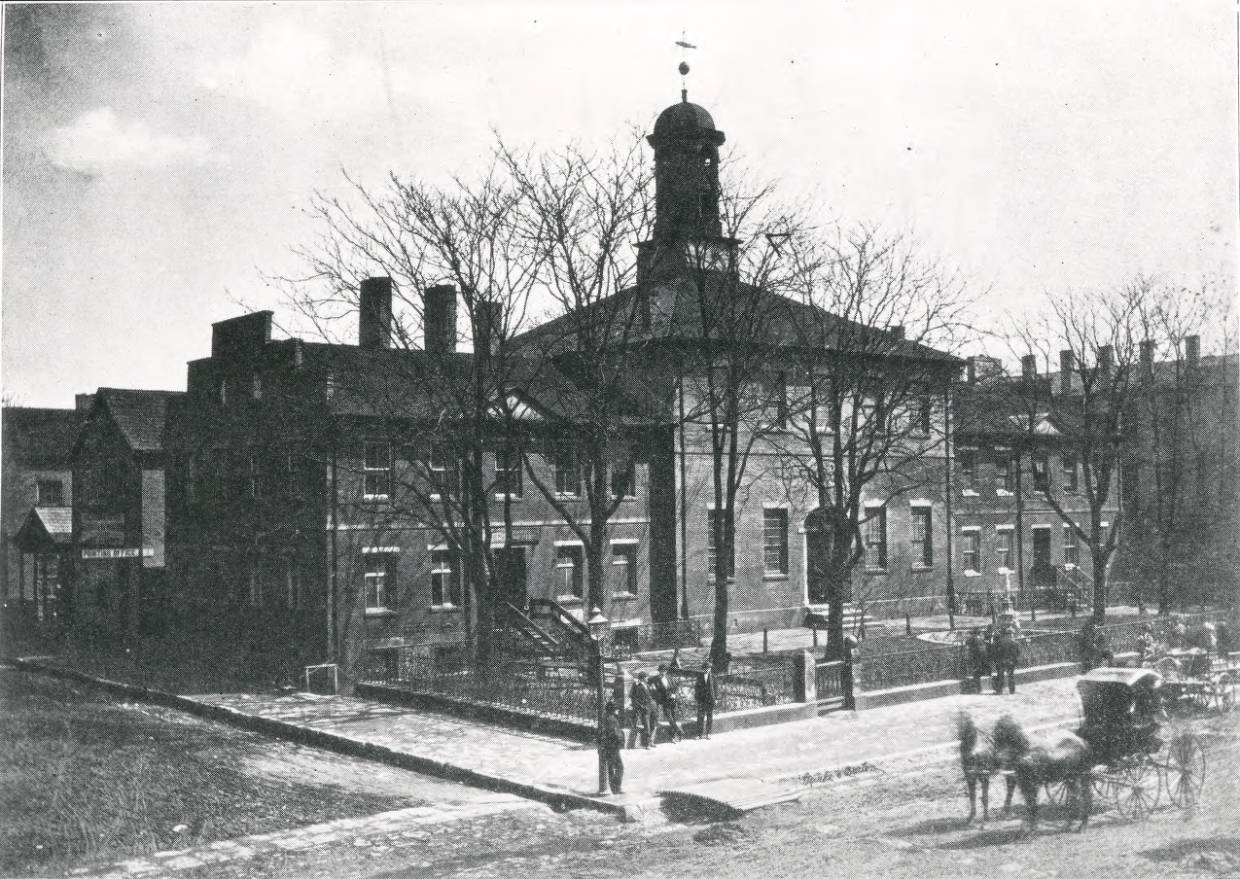
Ohio's statehouse 1810-1812 and Muskingum county courthouse 1812-1874

The site served as the capitol of Ohio from October 1, 1810, until May 1, 1812, and the 9th and 10th sessions of the Ohio General Assembly met here at the building that was formerly at the site before those sessions were returned to Chillicothe in May 1812. The former building on the site was then used as the Muskingum County Courthouse until current one was constructed in 1874. The 1809 date stone from the old building was incorporated into the new building and may be seen over the front steps.

Townsend was also involved in the building of the third Tuscarawas County Courthouse designed by architect Thomas Boyd and Wood County Courthouse and Jail.
