= 1958 Wilkes 160 =

Auto race held at North Wilkesboro Speedway in 1958

Race details
- Race 50 of 51 in the 1958 NASCAR Grand National Series season
- North Wilkesboro Speedway
- Date: October 19, 1958
- Official name: Wilkes 160
- Location: North Wilkesboro Speedway, North Wilkesboro, North Carolina
- Course: Permanent racing facility
- Course length: 0.625 miles (1.00 km)
- Distance: 160 laps, 100 mi (160 km)
- Weather: Chilly with temperatures of 64 °F (18 °C); wind speeds of 24.1 miles per hour (38.8 km/h)
- Average speed: 84.906 miles per hour (136.643 km/h)

Pole position
Driver	Glen Wood	Wood Brothers Racing

Most laps led
Driver	unknown	unknown
- Laps: unknown

Winner
No. 11	Junior Johnson	Paul Spalding

Television in the United States
- Network: untelevised
- Announcers: none

The 1958 Wilkes 160 was a NASCAR Grand National Series event that was held on October 19, 1958, at North Wilkesboro Speedway in North Wilkesboro, North Carolina.

The race car drivers still had to commute to the races using the same stock cars that competed in a typical weekend's race through a policy of homologation (and under their own power). This policy was in effect until roughly 1975. By 1980, NASCAR had completely stopped tracking the year model of all the vehicles and most teams did not take stock cars to the track under their own power anymore.

== Background ==
North Wilkesboro carried a reputation as one of the fastest short-tracks in auto racing in the late 1940s and 1950s. In 1950, speeds reached 73 mph at the track, compared to the next fastest short-track, Charlotte Speedway, where top speeds only reached 66 mph. Most of the fans in the early years of the sport saw the track as notorious for being a great venue to watch races between the legendary racers of the time. Racing at North Wilkesboro was intense and physical.

The 1950 Wilkes 200 was the second Grand National Series race held at North Wilkesboro Speedway. Twenty-six cars entered the race. Twenty-one-year-old Fireball Roberts qualified with a lap speed of 73.266 mph on the dirt track for his first ever Grand National pole, but engine problems dropped him out of the running. Fonty Flock started in the third position and led the most laps in the race with 104, but engine troubles also ended his day. Ultimately, Leon Sales led eight of the 200 laps to become the victor, the fourth NASCAR driver to win an event in his debut race. Jack Smith finished second after leading 55 laps in the race.

After hosting only one NASCAR event in 1949 and one in 1950, the track began running two Grand National Series events per year in 1951 (with the exception of 1956, when only one race was held; the track was being prepared for pavement). One race was held in the spring, normally in late March or early April, and another was held in the fall, normally in late September or early October. In 1957, owner Enoch Stanley had the 5/8-mile track paved.

The Wilkes 200 in 1952 turned into a battle between brothers. Two sets of brothers competed in the race, and they took the top four spots at the finish. The Flock Brothers (Fonty Flock and Tim Flock) were strong, but the Thomas brothers (Herb Thomas and Donald Thomas) had the better outcome. Herb Thomas, driving his 1952 "Fabulous" Hudson Hornet, won the pole, led 192 of the 200 laps, and grabbed the victory. Fonty Flock led the first eight laps and finished the race second. Donald Thomas, also in a 1952 "Fabulous" Hudson Hornet, finished third, and Tim Flock finished fourth. Eleven of the 27 cars entered in the race finished. Six of the top nine positions were driving Hudson Hornets.

Herb Thomas started on the pole for the 1953 Wilkes 200 with his record-setting qualifying speed of 78.424 mph on the dirt surface. Outside pole sitter Tim Flock led the first 100 laps before experiencing engine problems. Curtis Turner took the lead on Lap 101 and continued the lead until his car also succumbed to engine troubles nine laps later. Thomas in his Number 92 Hudson Hornet only lead 18 laps in the race but ended the race by taking his third consecutive win at North Wilkesboro. Starting from the third spot, Dick Rathmann led 70 laps and finished behind Herb Thomas. Fonty Flock managed to work his way up from the fourth starting position to the front and led three laps before dropping back and finishing third.

Pole sitter Buck Baker ran 78.288 mph to gap the pole for the 1953 Wilkes 160. Baker ran strong and led the most laps in the race with 80 out front before falling back into sixth position at the finish. Speedy Thompson led 25 laps, and Fonty Flock led 37. Curtis Turner led a total of 18 laps. At the end of the race, Thompson finished two laps ahead of second-place Flock. Thompson's win ended Herb Thomas and his Hudson Hornet's three-race winning streak at North Wilkesboro.

At the 1954 Wilkes County 160, Gober Sosebee won the pole with a lap speed of 78.698 mph. Sosebee led a race-high 112 laps but finished in 12th position, eight laps down. The only other leader was Dick Rathmann, who led 48 laps. Rathmann blew a tire while leading, with three laps to go, and still managed to finish and win the race. Herb Thomas finished some 20 seconds behind in second place.

In the 1954 Wilkes 160, Hershel McGriff won the pole with a qualifying speed of 77.612 mph. He and Dick Rathman were the only leaders of the race; McGriff led 74 laps, and Rathman led 83. The race was called three laps early because of a serious crash involving Lou Figaro; his car flipped, and the roof caved in. Figaro was transported to a hospital in Winston-Salem, but he died the following day from a skull fracture and brain damage suffered in the crash. McGriff was declared the winner. It was his final victory and his last Grand National race for 17 years.

Dink Widenhouse won his only career Grand National Series pole at the 1955 Wilkes County 160. Engine problems, however, landed Widenhouse out of the race. Outside pole sitter Buck Baker led all 160 laps, but by the last lap Dick Rathmann was glued to Baker's bumper, still charging. Rathmann's final charge off of Turn Four came up three feet short of stealing the victory. It was the closest finish in series history up to that time. Local native Junior Johnson ran in his first Grand National race at North Wilkesboro.

In 1956, the Wilkes County 160 was the only Grand National Series race of the season, and it was the last race on dirt at North Wilkesboro. Junior Johnson's 1956 Pontiac started from the pole and led the first 17 laps before engine problems sidelined him. Outside pole qualifier Speedy Thompson took over the lead from there until fuel line problems on Lap 114 forced him out of the race. Tim Flock led the final 46 laps, earning his first win at North Wilkesboro. After the race, Flock announced to Carl Kiekhafer that this would be the last time he would drive one of Kiekhafer's cars. Billy Myers was the runner-up.

The Wilkes County 160 in 1957 was dominated by the Pete DePaolo Fords. DePaolo entered five 1957 Fords in the race, and they all finished in the top six positions. Fireball Roberts put his DePaolo Ford on the pole with a qualifying speed of 81.5 mph. It was the first time the pole sitter had a speed over 80 mph. Roberts was the only driver to lead during the race, leading all 160 laps. Roberts won the race without making a single pit stop. DePaolo's other drivers were second-place finisher Paul Goldsmith, third place Ralph Moody, fourth place Marvin Panch, and sixth place Allen Adkins. Buck Baker's was the only non-Depaolo car in the top six. He finished in fifth place.

The Wilkes 160 of 1957 was Junior Johnson's first race after spending 11 months in jail for his moonshining activities. It was also his only start of the 1957 Grand National Series season. Fireball Roberts won the pole with a lap speed of 81.64 mph. Jack Smith passed Banjo Matthews with ten laps to go, holding off Lee Petty for the victory. Tragedy struck on Lap 47 when Tiny Lund's axle snapped. One of the wheels broke loose, hitting spectators. One spectator was injured, and another, William R. Thomasson, was killed.

The NASCAR Convertible Series ran two races at North Wilkesboro. In 1957, Ken Rush won the pole and led the first 21 laps before Glen Wood took the lead for the next 42 laps. Paul Goldsmith took the lead on Lap 64 and led the rest of the 160-lap race.

== Summary ==
Junior Johnson managed to defeat Glen Wood and 23 other American-born drivers after more than an hour (160 laps) of racing action. Wood would end up qualifying for the pole position with a then-rapid speed of 86.805 miles per hour (139.699 km/h). Clarence DeZalia ran out of gas while Barney Shore finished in last place on the 26th lap due to a problem with his radiator.

While the winner earned $800 in total prize winnings ($8,927.34 when adjusted for inflation), the last-place finisher walked away with a meager $50 paycheck ($557.96 when adjusted for inflation). Officials at North Wilkesboro Speedway approved a grand total of $3,885 in monetary winnings to be given out at this event ($43,353.37 when adjusted for inflation). Notable crew chiefs for this race include Clyde Holder, William Coble and Jess Potter.

Most of the car owners for this race were individuals who had the money and the knowledge to guide their chosen drivers through a typical season of NASCAR Grand National Series racing. Petty Enterprises, Holman Moody and Wood Brothers Racing were the three multi-car teams that would go on to be successful in NASCAR during the subsequent decades.

Richard Petty would never race using the #2 ever again after this race; he would eventually race in a single-digit number again by 1986. Every number that Richard would have from the remainder of 1958 to 1986 would be a variation on his father's No. 42.

=== Qualifying ===
Grid	No.	Driver	Manufacturer
1	21	Glen Wood	'58 Ford
2	11	Junior Johnson	'57 Ford
3	3	Cotton Owens	'58 Pontiac
4	46	Speedy Thompson	'57 Chevrolet
5	55	Jimmy Massey	'57 Pontiac
6	36	Tiny Lund	'58 Ford
7	42	Lee Petty	'57 Oldsmobile
8	87	Buck Baker	'57 Chevrolet
9	97	Barney Shore	'57 Chevrolet
10	2	Richard Petty	'57 Oldsmobile

=== Results ===
Pos	Grid	Car #	Driver	Owner	Make	Laps	Laps led	Status	Winnings
1	2	11	Junior Johnson		'57 Ford	160			$800
2	1	21	Glen Wood		'58 Ford	159			$525
3	4	46	Speedy Thompson		'57 Chevrolet	158			$350
4	3	3	Cotton Owens		'58 Pontiac	158			$250
5	11	86	Jack Smith		'57 Chevrolet	155			$225
6	5	55	Jimmy Massey		'57 Chevrolet	154			$200
7	14	14A	Wilbur Rakestraw		'57 Pontiac	154			$165
8	16	32	Brownie King		'57 Chevrolet	154			$150
9	7	42	Lee Petty		'57 Oldsmobile	150			$140
10	8	87	Buck Baker		'57 Chevrolet	150			$130
11	13	50	Gober Sosebee						$125
12	12	14	Larry Frank						$110
13	18	17	Fred Harb						$100
14	6	36	Tiny Lund						$85
15	22	0	Bunk Moore						$70
16	17	19	Herman Beam						$60
17	19	94	Clarence DeZalia	Clarence DeZalia				Out of Gas	$50
18	21	74	L.D. Austin						$50
19	20	711	Bill Poor						$50
20	18	96	Bobby Keck					Electrical	$50
21	23	63	R.L. Combs					Piston	$50
22	24	202	Johnny Gardner					Fuel Pump	$50
23	10	2	Richard Petty					Overheating	$50
24	9	97	Barney Shore					Radiator	$50

==== Race summary ====
- Lead changes: N/A
- Cautions: 0
- Red flags: N/A
- Time of race: 1:10:40
- Average speed: 84.906 mph
- Margin of Victory: 1 lap +

== Timeline ==
Section reference:

- Start of race: Glen Wood started the race with the pole position.
- Lap 26: The radiator on Barney Shore's vehicle acted up, forcing him to accept a last-place finish.
- Lap 35: Richard Petty overheated his vehicle, bringing his race weekend to an end.
- Lap 67: Problems with Johnny Gardner's fuel pump ended his chances of finishing the race.
- Lap 79: Troublesome pistons ended R.L. Combs' day on the track.
- Lap 112: Electrical problems forced Bobby Keck into the sidelines.
- Lap 136: Clarence DeZalia ran out of gas, forcing him off the track.
- Finish: Junior Johnson was officially declared the winner of the event.
