= Thomas Shelton =

Thomas Shelton may refer to:

- Thomas Shelton (translator), translator of Don Quixote
- Thomas Shelton (stenographer) (died 1650), English stenographer
- Thomas Shelton (gospel singer) (born 1958), Southern gospel musician
- Thomas Shelton (aircraft constructor)

== See also ==
- Thomas Skelton (disambiguation), common alternative spelling for Shelton in medieval/early modern period
