= Zanesville, Ohio =

- City
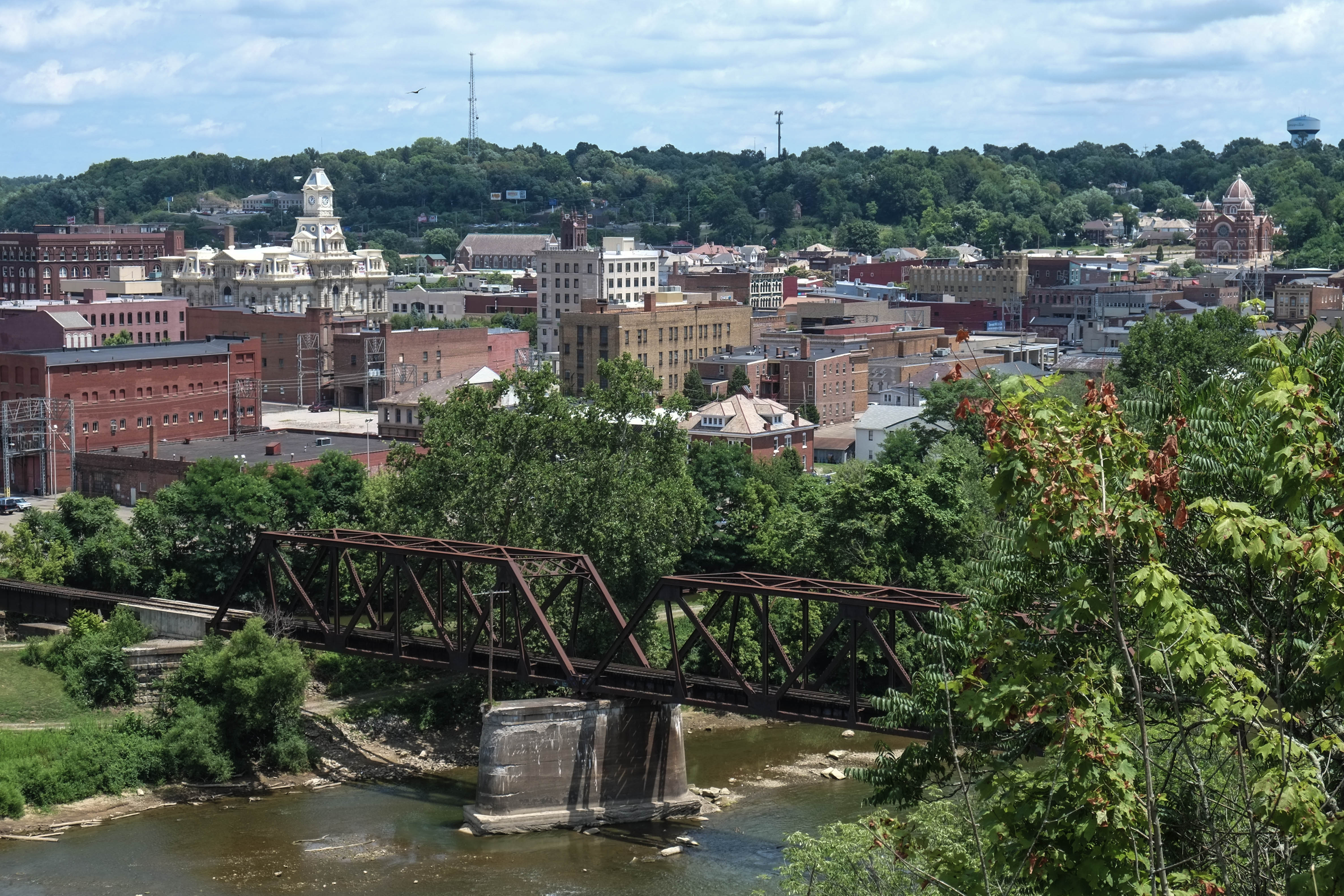
- Downtown Zanesville
- Nicknames: "City of Natural Advantages", "Y City", "Clay City", "The Y Bridge City"
- Interactive map of Zanesville, Ohio
- Location within Ohio Location within the United States
- Coordinates: 39°57′34″N 82°00′48″W
- Country: United States
- State: Ohio
- County: Muskingum
- Named for: Ebenezer Zane

Government
  - Mayor: Donald Mason (R)

Area
  - Total: 12.13 sq mi (31.41 km^{2})
  - Land: 11.78 sq mi (30.50 km^{2})
  - Water: 0.35 sq mi (0.91 km^{2})
- Elevation: 768 ft (234 m)

Population (2020)
  - Total: 24,765
  - Density: 2,102.9/sq mi (811.92/km^{2})
- Time zone: UTC−5 (Eastern (EST))
  - Summer (DST): UTC−4 (EDT)
- ZIP Codes: 43701–43702
- Area code: 740
- FIPS code: 39-88084
- GNIS feature ID: 1086738
- Website: www.coz.org

Zanesville is a city in Muskingum County, Ohio, United States, and its county seat. Located at the confluence of the Licking and Muskingum rivers, the city is approximately 52 miles (84 km) east of Columbus and had a population of 24,765 as of the 2020 census, down from 25,487 as of the 2010 census. Historically the state capital of Ohio from 1810 to 1812, Zanesville anchors the Zanesville micropolitan area (population 86,183) and is part of the greater Columbus-Marion-Zanesville combined statistical area.

== History ==
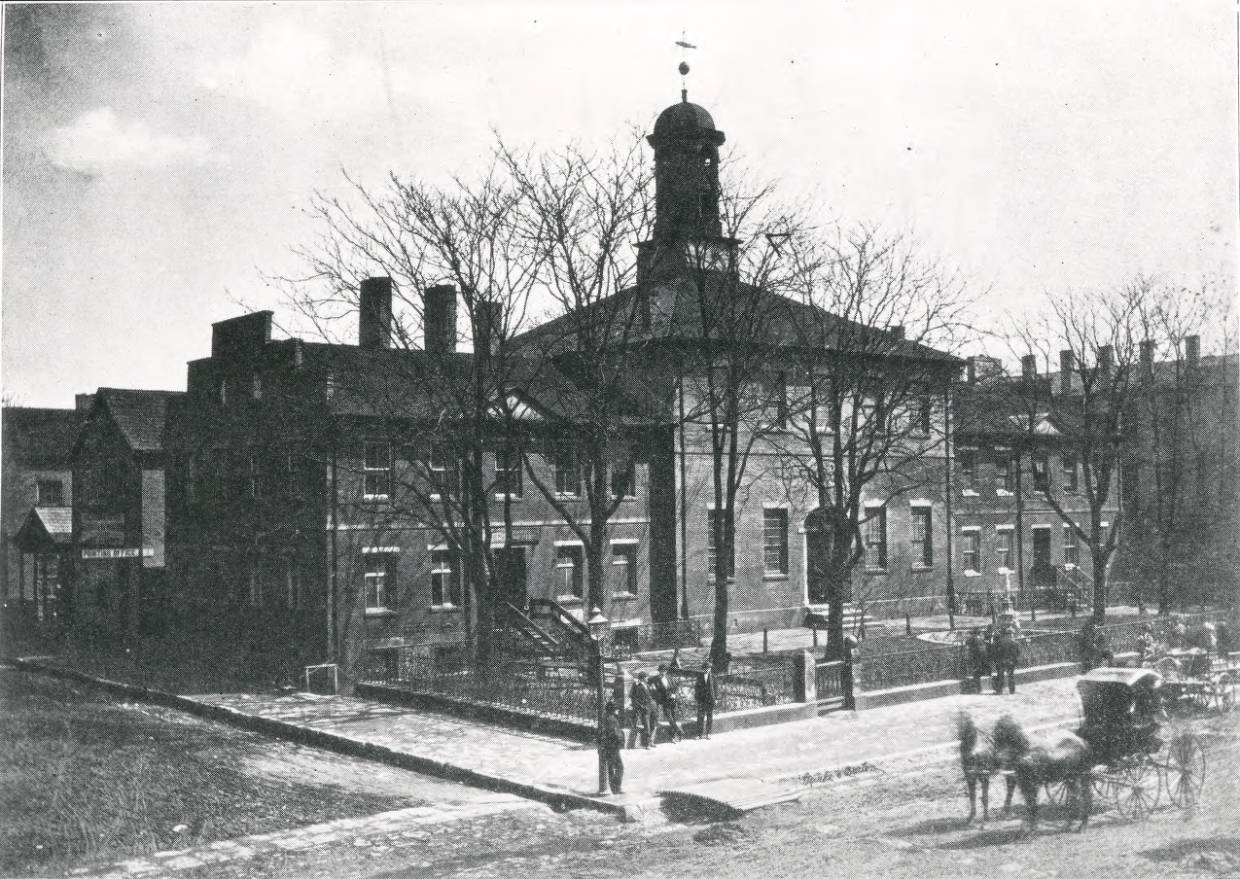
The second Ohio Statehouse, built in 1809

Zanesville was named after Ebenezer Zane (1747–1811), who had blazed Zane's Trace, a pioneer trail from Wheeling, West Virginia, to Maysville, Kentucky, through present-day Ohio. In 1797, he remitted land as payment to his son-in-law, John McIntire (1759–1815), at the point where Zane's Trace met the Muskingum River. With the assistance of Zane, McIntire platted the town and opened an inn and ferry by 1799. In 1801, Zanesville was officially renamed, formerly Westbourne, the chosen name for the settlement by Zane.

From 1810 to 1812, the city was the second state capital of Ohio. The National Road courses through Zanesville as U.S. Route 40. The city grew quickly in the 1820s through 1850s. Zanesville and Putnam (eastern side of Muskingum River), from the 1840s until the American Civil War broke out, was part of the Underground Railroad. In excess of 5,000 Union soldiers, along with hundreds of townsfolk, were stationed in the Zanesville area to protect the city in 1863 during Morgan's Raid. Novelist Zane Grey, a descendant of the Zane family, was born in the city.

After the Civil War, the city grew in size and gained prominence in the State for manufacturing and textiles. The city was also notoriously known for its bootlegging activities in the Prohibition era. From the 1820s until the 1970s, downtown Zanesville was the premiere economic center of the city with various factories, offices, small to large stores, many hotels, over a dozen stages and movie theaters, nearly twenty churches, and nearby neighborhoods (inhabited mainly by persons of Irish or German ethnicity).

In 1872, Zanesville annexed the adjacent community of Putnam. It is now the Putnam Historic District of Zanesville.

The city was historically known as a center for pottery manufacturing; in the first half of the 20th century, more than a dozen potteries operated in the city and the surrounding areas. Bolstered by ample local clay deposits and rivers, the area produced both art pottery and functional, utilitarian pottery. Notable pottery manufacturers that operated in the area included Weller Pottery, J. B. Owens Pottery Company, Roseville Pottery, American Encaustic Tiling Company, and the Mosaic Tile Company. The city peaked economically in the 1950s, and like many cities experienced a post-industrial decline. In the 21st century, it has a relatively high level of chronic poverty and unemployment and a relatively low level of labor force participation and educational attainment.

Zanesville gained national recognition after the Zanesville animal escape in October 2011, in which 50 exotic animals were released from a private zoo, and 48 were killed by police to ensure public safety.

== Geography ==
Zanesville is located along the Muskingum River at its confluence with the Licking River. It is located 23 mi (37 km) west of Cambridge and 52 mi (84 km) east of Columbus. The National (Cumberland) Road and its successors U.S. Route 40 and Interstate 70 cross the Muskingum at Zanesville.

According to the United States Census Bureau, the city has a total area of 12.14 square miles (31.44 km^{2}), of which 11.77 square miles (30.48 km^{2}) is land and 0.37 square miles (0.96 km^{2}) is water.

The area has important deposits of clay which were exploited by a number of pottery companies in the first half of the twentieth century, including Roseville Pottery, Weller Pottery, the J. B. Owens Pottery Company, the Zanesville Stoneware Company, the Mosaic Tile Company, the American Encaustic Tiling Company, and the T.B. Townsend Brick Yard under the ownership of T.B. Townsend.

=== Climate ===
Climate data for Zanesville, Ohio (1991–2020 normals, extremes 1895–present)
| Month | Jan | Feb | Mar | Apr | May | Jun | Jul | Aug | Sep | Oct | Nov | Dec | Year |
|---|---|---|---|---|---|---|---|---|---|---|---|---|---|
| Record high °F (°C) | 74 (23) | 78 (26) | 87 (31) | 92 (33) | 98 (37) | 101 (38) | 106 (41) | 105 (41) | 103 (39) | 93 (34) | 82 (28) | 76 (24) | 106 (41) |
| Mean daily maximum °F (°C) | 38.4 (3.6) | 42.0 (5.6) | 52.0 (11.1) | 64.6 (18.1) | 73.8 (23.2) | 81.4 (27.4) | 84.8 (29.3) | 83.7 (28.7) | 77.5 (25.3) | 65.6 (18.7) | 53.2 (11.8) | 42.5 (5.8) | 63.3 (17.4) |
| Daily mean °F (°C) | 30.1 (−1.1) | 32.9 (0.5) | 41.6 (5.3) | 52.8 (11.6) | 62.3 (16.8) | 70.5 (21.4) | 74.2 (23.4) | 72.7 (22.6) | 65.9 (18.8) | 54.3 (12.4) | 43.4 (6.3) | 34.7 (1.5) | 52.9 (11.6) |
| Mean daily minimum °F (°C) | 21.7 (−5.7) | 23.8 (−4.6) | 31.3 (−0.4) | 41.0 (5.0) | 50.9 (10.5) | 59.6 (15.3) | 63.6 (17.6) | 61.7 (16.5) | 54.4 (12.4) | 43.1 (6.2) | 33.7 (0.9) | 26.8 (−2.9) | 42.6 (5.9) |
| Record low °F (°C) | −25 (−32) | −20 (−29) | −6 (−21) | 10 (−12) | 23 (−5) | 31 (−1) | 41 (5) | 36 (2) | 28 (−2) | 15 (−9) | −6 (−21) | −17 (−27) | −25 (−32) |
| Average precipitation inches (mm) | 2.80 (71) | 2.31 (59) | 3.24 (82) | 3.86 (98) | 3.79 (96) | 4.29 (109) | 3.73 (95) | 3.20 (81) | 3.12 (79) | 2.81 (71) | 2.79 (71) | 2.63 (67) | 38.57 (980) |
| Average snowfall inches (cm) | 7.2 (18) | 4.2 (11) | 3.8 (9.7) | 1.6 (4.1) | 0.0 (0.0) | 0.0 (0.0) | 0.0 (0.0) | 0.0 (0.0) | 0.0 (0.0) | 0.1 (0.25) | 0.9 (2.3) | 3.4 (8.6) | 21.2 (54) |
| Average precipitation days (≥ 0.01 in) | 12.9 | 10.8 | 12.2 | 13.3 | 13.4 | 11.9 | 11.3 | 9.9 | 8.9 | 10.3 | 10.4 | 12.3 | 137.6 |
| Average snowy days (≥ 0.1 in) | 7.7 | 4.5 | 3.7 | 0.8 | 0.0 | 0.0 | 0.0 | 0.0 | 0.0 | 0.1 | 1.5 | 4.2 | 22.5 |
Source: NOAA (snow 1981–2010)

== Demographics ==
Historical population
| Census | Pop. | Note | %± |
|---|---|---|---|
| 1800 | 474 | | — |
| 1810 | 1,154 | | 143.5% |
| 1820 | 2,052 | | 77.8% |
| 1830 | 3,094 | | 50.8% |
| 1840 | 4,766 | | 54.0% |
| 1850 | 7,929 | | 66.4% |
| 1860 | 9,229 | | 16.4% |
| 1870 | 10,011 | | 8.5% |
| 1880 | 18,113 | | 80.9% |
| 1890 | 21,009 | | 16.0% |
| 1900 | 23,538 | | 12.0% |
| 1910 | 28,026 | | 19.1% |
| 1920 | 29,569 | | 5.5% |
| 1930 | 36,440 | | 23.2% |
| 1940 | 37,500 | | 2.9% |
| 1950 | 40,517 | | 8.0% |
| 1960 | 39,077 | | −3.6% |
| 1970 | 33,045 | | −15.4% |
| 1980 | 28,655 | | −13.3% |
| 1990 | 26,778 | | −6.6% |
| 2000 | 25,586 | | −4.5% |
| 2010 | 25,487 | | −0.4% |
| 2020 | 24,765 | | −2.8% |
U.S. Decennial Census

In the 1950s, Zanesville was known for its population of light-skinned Blacks who could "pass" (be admitted to whites-only places). This characteristic was due to a history of racial intermixing dating back to the role of Zanesville as a stop on the Underground Railroad.

=== 2020 census ===
As of the 2020 census, Zanesville had a population of 24,765. The median age was 38.2 years. 22.9% of residents were under the age of 18 and 18.8% of residents were 65 years of age or older. For every 100 females there were 89.1 males, and for every 100 females age 18 and over there were 85.1 males age 18 and over.

99.6% of residents lived in urban areas, while 0.4% lived in rural areas.

There were 10,903 households in Zanesville, of which 26.4% had children under the age of 18 living in them. Of all households, 28.4% were married-couple households, 22.4% were households with a male householder and no spouse or partner present, and 38.5% were households with a female householder and no spouse or partner present. About 39.0% of all households were made up of individuals and 18.1% had someone living alone who was 65 years of age or older.

There were 12,157 housing units, of which 10.3% were vacant. The homeowner vacancy rate was 3.2% and the rental vacancy rate was 7.9%.

Racial composition as of the 2020 census
| Race | Number | Percent |
|---|---|---|
| White | 19,928 | 80.5% |
| Black or African American | 2,123 | 8.6% |
| American Indian and Alaska Native | 67 | 0.3% |
| Asian | 124 | 0.5% |
| Native Hawaiian and Other Pacific Islander | 3 | 0.0% |
| Some other race | 273 | 1.1% |
| Two or more races | 2,247 | 9.1% |
| Hispanic or Latino (of any race) | 442 | 1.8% |

=== 2010 census ===
As of the census of 2010, there were 25,487 people, 10,864 households, and 6,176 families residing in the city. The population density was 2,165.4 inhabitants per square mile (836.1/km^{2}). There were 12,385 housing units at an average density of 1,052.3 per square mile (406.3/km^{2}). The racial makeup of the city was 84.4% White, 9.7% African American, 0.4% Native American, 0.4% Asian, 0.4% from other races, and 4.7% from two or more races. Hispanic or Latino of any race were 1.2% of the population.

There were 10,864 households, of which 31.3% had children under the age of 18 living with them, 32.1% were married couples living together, 19.1% had a female householder with no husband present, 5.7% had a male householder with no wife present, and 43.2% were non-families. 36.2% of all households were made up of individuals, and 14.9% had someone living alone who was 65 years of age or older. The average household size was 2.29 and the average family size was 2.97.

The median age in the city was 36.3 years. 25.1% of residents were under the age of 18; 9.8% were between the ages of 18 and 24; 25.6% were from 25 to 44; 24.5% were from 45 to 64; and 15.2% were 65 years of age or older. The gender makeup of the city was 46.6% male and 53.4% female.

=== 2000 census ===
As of the census of 2000, there were 25,586 people, 10,572 households, and 6,438 families residing in the city. The population density was 2,276.8 inhabitants per square mile (879.1/km^{2}). There were 11,662 housing units at an average density of 1,037.8 per square mile (400.7/km^{2}). The racial makeup of the city was 85.48% White, 10.76% African American, 0.40% Native American, 0.23% Asian, 0.02% Pacific Islander, 0.42% from other races, and 2.70% from two or more races. Hispanic or Latino of any race were 0.79% of the population.

There were 10,572 households, out of which 30.7% had children under the age of 18 living with them, 38.5% were married couples living together, 18.0% had a female householder with no husband present, and 39.1% were non-families. 33.4% of all households were made up of individuals, and 14.5% had someone living alone who was 65 years of age or older. The average household size was 2.36 and the average family size was 2.99.

In the city, the population was spread out, with 26.8% under the age of 18, 9.5% from 18 to 24, 27.8% from 25 to 44, 20.5% from 45 to 64, and 15.5% who were 65 years of age or older. The median age was 35 years. For every 100 females, there were 85.3 males. For every 100 females age 18 and over, there were 79.3 males.

The median income for a household in the city was $26,642, and the median income for a family was $31,932. Males had a median income of $27,902 versus $20,142 for females. The per capita income for the city was $15,192. About 19.3% of families and 22.4% of the population were below the poverty line, including 32.3% of those under age 18 and 14.8% of those age 65 or over.

== Government ==
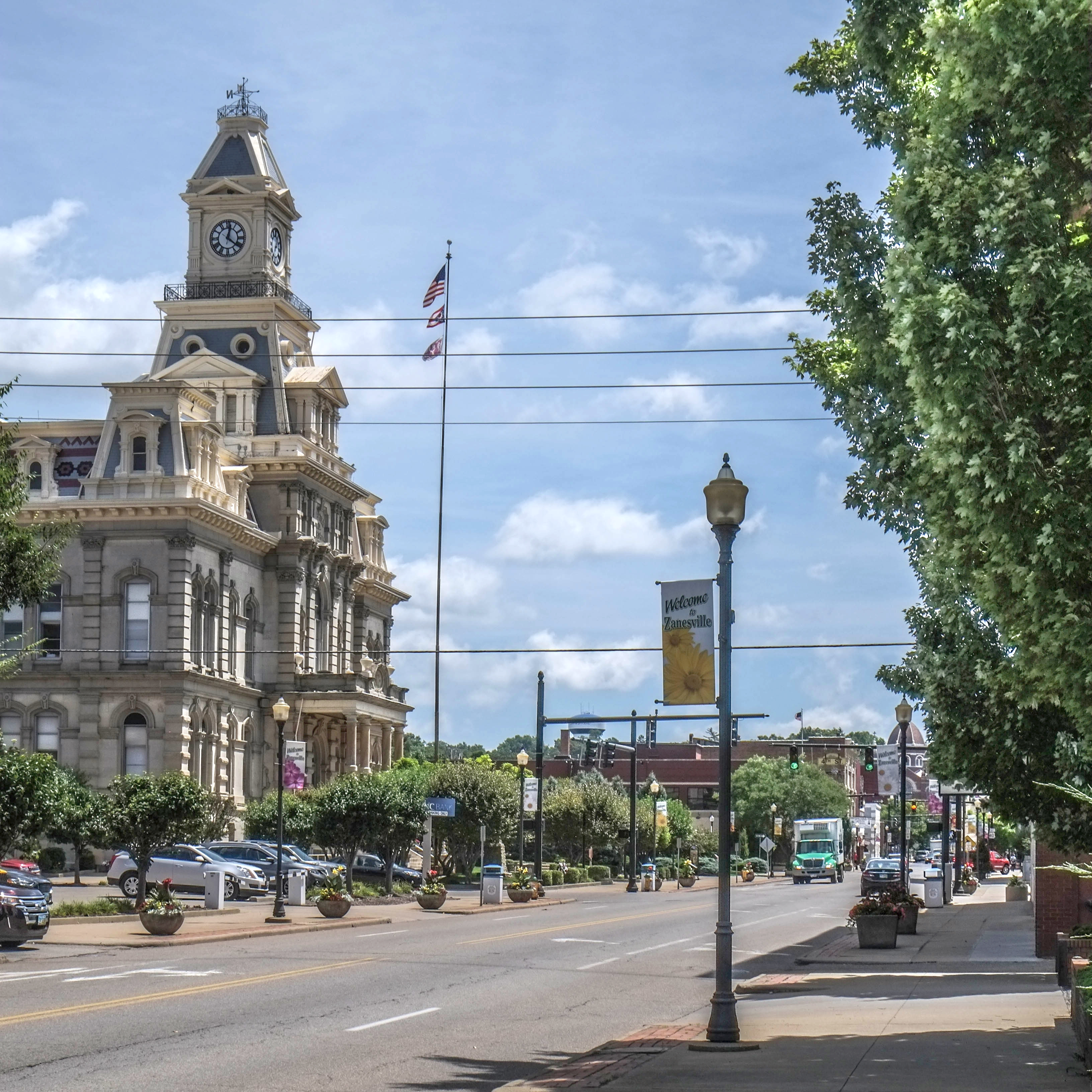
Muskingum County Courthouse (left) and Main Street

The city government is a Mayor/Council (10 members) elected form of government. Zanesville Police Department was formed in 1865 with 6 officers. Today the department has over 55 officers and 40 more support staff. The City Fire Department became fully paid staff in 1879. This department today has over 45 members working 24 on & 48 hours off, staffing 3 stations.

== Education ==
=== Schools ===
- The first school house (a log cabin) was built and opened in Zanesville in 1803. Zanesville High School is the high school for the Zanesville City Schools.
  - Most students living within Zanesville city limits attend Zanesville City Schools, while small northern portions of the city are in West Muskingum Local School District and Tri-Valley Local School District. Additionally, students with Zanesville addresses but living outside of the city limits may attend Tri-Valley High School, John Glenn High School, West Muskingum High School, Maysville High School, and Philo High School.
- There are two private high schools—Bishop Rosecrans High School (Roman Catholic) and Zanesville Christian School.

=== Colleges ===
- Ohio University-Zanesville (OUZ) is a branch campus of Ohio University. The branch was in the high school building from 1946 until the current campus opened in 1969.
- Zane State College, formerly known as Muskingum Area Technical College, is adjacent to OUZ founded in 1969.
- Muskingum University is located in nearby New Concord.

== Infrastructure ==
=== Transportation ===
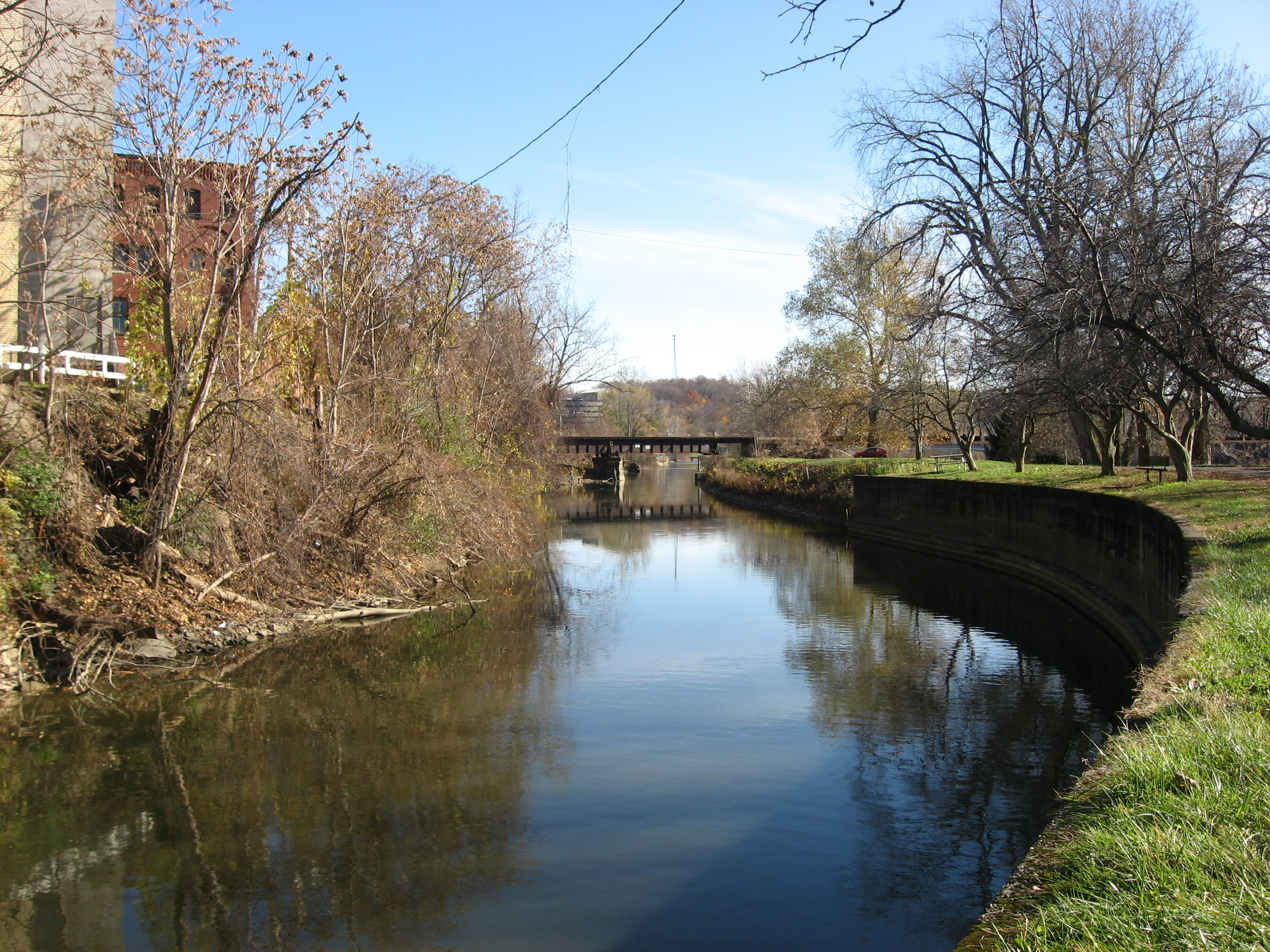
The Muskingum River Canal, a major transportation artery in Zanesville in the nineteenth century

The city is served by Zanesville Municipal Airport, built during World War II, and opened near the end. It has two 5,000 ft (1,500 m) runways. The airport had commercial flights from the late 1940s until the early 1970s.

The city is also served by several railroad lines.

Interstate 70 and U.S. Route 40 (which closely follows the path of the older National Road), pass through Zanesville and run roughly parallel to each other. From the southwest, US 22 approaches from Cincinnati. North-south state highways 60 and 93 pass through Zanesville. Other state routes include 666, 555, 719, and 146.

A three-way bridge called the "Y-Bridge" spans the confluence of the Licking and the Muskingum rivers. Listed on the National Register of Historic Places, it is one of few bridges of its type in the United States. Its unique shape led pilot Amelia Earhart to describe Zanesville as "the most recognizable city in the country". It has been rebuilt numerous times since the 1850s.

=== Hospital ===
In 2016, the Good Samaritan campus and the Bethesda campus merged to form Genesis Hospital. The Good Samaritan campus was closed and demolished.

== Notable people ==
- Kurt Abbott (born 1969), baseball player
- Clyde Alwood (1895–1954), college baseball player
- Tahnai Annis (born 1989), soccer player
- Troy Balderson (born 1962), politician
- Edward Bell (1811–1872), politician
- Andre Barnett (born 1976), politician and entrepreneur
- Richard Basehart (1914–1984), actor
- Bobby Beathard (1937–2023), American football executive
- Kaitlin Bennett (born 1995), activist
- David F. Bice (born 1945), military officer
- Howard Bland (1848–1933), businessman and politician
- Thomas Townsend Brown (1905–1985), inventor
- Elwood Bruner (1854–1915), politician
- William C. Bryan (1852–1913), military officer
- Hazel Joan Bryant (1939–1983), actress, singer and playwright
- Catharinus P. Buckingham (1808–1888), military officer
- Emma Cadwalader-Guild (1843–1911), sculptor and painter
- Una Mae Carlisle (1915–1956), jazz singer, pianist and songwriter
- Howdy Caton (1894–1948), baseball player
- David Chambers (1780–1864), politician
- Duncan Convers (1851–1929), priest and author
- Samuel S. Cox (1824–1889), politician and diplomat
- Ralph W. Cram (1869–1952), journalist
- Anne Virginia Culbertson (1857–1918), writer
- Mark Dantonio (born 1956), American football player and coach
- Zella Allen Dixson (1858–1924), writer, lecturer and publisher
- Donald Marquand Dozer (1905–1980), scholar
- Constance Goddard DuBois (died 1934), novelist and ethnographer
- Lucius Loyd Durfee (1861–1933), military officer
- Naaman Fletcher, clubman
- John Wells Foster (1815–1873), geologist and archaeologist
- Bob Gaiters (1938–2024), American football player
- Johnny Gardner (1882–c. 1953), gangster
- Charles H. Gaus (1840–1909), politician
- James M. Gaylord (1811–1874), politician
- Andy Gibson (1913–1961), trumpeter, arranger and composer
- Cass Gilbert (1859–1934), architect
- Charles Champion Gilbert (1822–1903), military officer
- David Graf (1950–2001), actor
- Alfred Hoyt Granger (1867–1913), architect
- Robert S. Granger (1816–1894), military officer
- Reddy Grey (1875–1934), baseball player
- Zane Grey (1872–1939), author and dentist
- Carl Hugo Grimm (1890–1978), composer
- Harry P. Guy (1870–1950), composer
- John E. Hamm (1776–1864), politician
- Otis Harlan (1865–1940), actor
- Alexander Harper (1786–1870), politician
- Butch Hartman (1940–1994), racing driver
- Ella Hattan (1859–?), fencer and actress
- Charles E. Hazlett (1838–1863), military officer
- Howard Helmick (1845–1907), painter
- Samuel Herrick (1779–1852), politician
- Brian Hill, politician
- Joy Alice Hintz (1926–2009), writer
- George Jackson (1757–1831), politician
- Gladden James (1888–1948), actor
- Mandy Jenkins (1980–2023), journalist
- Hugh J. Jewett (1817–1898), politician
- Clarence Jones (born 1940), baseball player
- Colt Keith (born 2001), baseball player
- Richard Kelly (1910–1977), lighting designer
- Mary Aquinas Kinskey (1894–1985), religious sister, teacher and aviator
- Kolby LaCrone (born 1986), soccer player
- Sharon Ann Lane (1943–1969), Army nurse
- Mortimer D. Leggett (1821–1896), lawyer, military officer and educator
- Theodore Lorber (1906–1989), fencer
- George Washington Manypenny (1808–1892), journalist
- Carrington T. Marshall (1869–1958), judge
- Leon C. Marshall (1879–1866), economist
- Kevin Martin (born 1983), basketball player
- Charles F. Marvin (1858–1943), meteorologist
- John McIntire (1759–1815), pioneer
- Jack Mercer (1889–1945), baseball player
- Ralph D. Mershon (1868–1952), electrical engineer and inventor
- Virginia Minnich (1910–1996), molecular biologist
- Robert Mitchell (1778–1848), politician
- Tom Van Horn Moorehead (1898–1979), politician
- Gordon Newell Mott (1812–1887), politician
- Hal Naragon (1928–2019), baseball player
- Robert Newell (1807–1869), politician
- Nightbirde (1990–2022), singer-songwriter
- John O'Neil (1822–1905), lawyer and politician
- Sy Oliver (1910–1988), trumpeter, composer, singer and bandleader
- Dan Patrick (born 1957), sportscaster
- Jay Payton (born 1972), baseball player
- Joseph H. Outhwaite (1841–1907), politician
- Petra Pinn (1881–1958), nurse
- Princess Anastasia of Greece and Denmark (1878–1923), heiress
- Michele Redman (born 1965), golfer
- Frederick Hurten Rhead (1880–1942), potter
- Addison Richards (1902–1964), actor
- Kim Richey (born 1956), singer-songwriter and guitarist
- Ken Richardson (1950–2013), basketball player
- Ted Ross (1934–2002), actor
- Randy Savage (1952–2011), professional wrestler
- Milton I. Southard (1836–1905), politician
- Mark Schilling (born 1949), writer
- Gottlieb Schumacher (1857–1925), architect
- Jacob Schumacher (1825–1891), architect, engineer and diplomat
- George Sharrock (1910–2005), politician
- Thomas Shelton, musician
- Steve Smith (born 1951), clown
- David Spangler (1796–1856), politician
- Chad Stewart, rock drummer
- Jeff Stone (born 1961), politician
- Phil Stremmel (1880–1947), baseball player
- Paul D. Stroop (1904–1995), military officer
- Willis P. Sweatnam (1854–1930), actor
- Fred Taylor (1924–2002), baseball player and basketball coach
- Duane Theiss (born 1953), baseball player
- T. B. Townsend (1837–1916), businessman
- Jean Starr Untermeyer (1886–1970), poet
- Jefferson Van Horne (1802–1857), military officer
- Daniel Van Voorhis (1878–1956), military officer
- H. Clay Van Voorhis (1852–1927), politician
- Lawrence Weldon (1829–1905), judge
- David P. Wheeler (1876–1904), military officer
- Whitey Wietelmann (1919–2002), baseball player
- Robert L. Wilson (1805–1880), politician
- A. M. Winn (1810–1883), politician
- Robert D. Workman (1885–1977), military officer
- Jesse Yarnell (1837–1906), newspaperman
