= Zanesville City School District =

School district in Ohio, United States

Address
- 956 Moxahala Avenue Zanesville, Ohio, 43701; United States

District information
- Type: Public
- Grades: PK–12
- Schools: 6
- NCES District ID: 3904517

Students and staff
- Students: 3,061 (2025–2026)
- Teachers: 168.00 (on an FTE basis) (2025–2026)
- Staff: 334.95 (on an FTE basis) (2025–2026)
- Student–teacher ratio: 18.22 (2025–2026)

Other information
- Website: www.zanesville.k12.oh.us

Zanesville City School District is a public school district serving students in the city of Zanesville, Ohio, United States. The school district enrolls 3,654 students as of the 2012–2013 academic year.

== History ==
The first school house (a log-cabin) was built and opened in 1803. There have been five different buildings housing Zanesville High School. The first was on 9th Street 1842 till 1884, which was razed to build Pioneer Elementary School. The second in 1884, and in 1908 became Hancock Junior High School, when the new high school was built. The 1884 building originally had 4 floors, but was later lowered and only had 2 floors. The third high school, was Lash High School, in 1908, which became the new Hancock Junior High School in 1953 when the 4th Zanesville opened in 1953. In 2010 the 5th high school was built right atop where the 1953 building was originally located.

== Schools today ==
=== Elementary schools ===
- John McIntire Elementary School (Grades K through 6th)
- National Road Elementary School (Grades K through 6th)
- Zane Grey Elementary School (Grades K through 6th)

=== Middle school ===
- Zanesville Middle School (Grades 7th and 8th)

=== High schools ===
- Zanesville High School (Grades 9th through 12th)
