= Zanesville High School =

Public school in Zaneville, Ohio, US

Location
- 1701 Blue Avenue; Zanesville, Ohio; 39.960556°N 82.017222°W

Information
- Type: Public
- Motto: Bleed Blue
- Established: 1855
- School district: Zanesville City School District
- Principal: Libby Hitchens
- Faculty: 34.50 (FTE)
- Grades: 9-12
- Enrollment: 691 (2022-23)
- Student to teacher ratio: 20.03
- Colors: Blue & White
- Athletics conference: Licking County League
- Mascot: Blue Devil
- Website: www.zanesville.k12.oh.us/zanesvillehighschool_home.aspx

Zanesville High School (ZHS) is a public high school in Zanesville, Ohio, United States. Zanesville High School is the only public high school in the Zanesville City School District.

== History ==
The first Zanesville High School was built in downtown North 6th Street 1849 and opened in 1855. In 1908, a new Zanesville High School was built across the street and named Lash High School in honor of Superintendent William D. Lash.

The fourth version, was opened on September 9, 1954, on Blue Ave. This land was willed by John McIntire for public park/education. At the time of its opening, the Times Recorder said of the $4 million school, "you have to see it to believe it.". Old Lash High became Hancock Jr High until it was demolished in the early 1980s.

From 1908 until 1988, ZHS housed grades 10–12, now ZHS houses grades 9–12. The fifth Zanesville High School opened on September 7, 2010, built on the same land as the old ZHS on Blue Ave.

== Clubs and activities ==
Clubs and activities include: Robotics Club, National Honor Society, Key Club, Comus, Drama Club, Foreign Language Club, Quiz Team, Japanese Anime & Culture Club (JACC), Fellowship of Christian Students, eSports, the Table-Top Gaming Club, Ski Club and S.A.D.D. Club. The Latin Club is now defunct. It once functioned as a local chapter of both the Ohio Junior Classical League (OJCL) and National Junior Classical League (NJCL).

== Athletics ==
As members of the Ohio High School Athletic Association, the Zanesville Blue Devils sport 14 varsity teams. Most Blue Devil squads compete in Division II, although a few compete in Division I. Zanesville competes in the Licking County League. ZHS sports teams in the following sports: Baseball (Boys), Basketball (Boys and Girls), Cheerleading, Cross Country, Football, Golf, Marching Band, Soccer (Boys and Girls), Softball (Girls), Swimming, Tennis (Boys and Girls), Track, Volleyball (Girls) Wrestling

=== Ohio High School Athletic Association State Championships ===
- Boys' Basketball – 1926, 1955, 1995
  - The 1995 Zanesville boys' basketball team finished its state championship run with a 26–0 record. As of the 2015–16 season, the Blue Devils are the only Division I team in state history to finish with an unbeaten record. Prior to ZHS, the last team in Ohio's largest class/division to finish undefeated was Akron Central-Hower, which finished 28–0 to claim the Class AAA state title in 1980.
- Track and Field
  - John Simpson, 1968: Shot Put - 60' 7-3/4"
  - Jon Thomas, 1980: 300 meter Low hurdles - :36.8
  - Jon Thomas, 1981: 110 meter hurdles - :14.18
  - Jon Thomas, 1981: 300 meter Low hurdles - :36.45
  - Ira Wentworth, 1988: 3200 meter - 9:19.46
  - Ira Wentworth, 1989: 3200 meter - 9:14.24
  - Erika Goines, 1993: Shot Put - 44' 10-3/4"
  - Erika Goines, 1994: Shot Put - 44' 11"
- Boys' Tennis
  - Mark Mees, 1978 & 1979
  - Ty Tucker, 1985

=== Football ===
The Zanesville football team is the alma mater of Buster Howe, the state's first Mr. Football Award winner.

== Notable alumni ==
- Todd Cerney- rock and country musician, composer and producer
- Mark Dantonio - Michigan State University Head Football coach
- Bob Gaiters - New Mexico State Aggies, New York Giants, San Francisco 49ers, Denver Broncos, Hamilton Tiger-Cats, Newark Bears, Hartford Charter Oaks, Orange County Ramblers
- Kevin Martin - Sacramento Kings, Houston Rockets, Minnesota Timberwolves
- Jay Payton - Georgia Institute of Technology, New York Mets, Colorado Rockies, San Diego Padres, Boston Red Sox, Oakland Athletics, Baltimore Orioles
- Michele Redman - LPGA Professional
- Troy Balderson - Ohio House of Representatives of District 94, January 2009- July 2011; Ohio State Senator, July 2011-August 2018; US House of Representatives of district 12.
