= Thomas Skelton =

Thomas Skelton may refer to:

- Thomas R. Skelton, American lighting designer
- Tom Skelton (jester), court jester at Muncaster Castle
- Tommy Skelton (1856–1900), jockey
- Thomas Skelton (MP died 1416), MP for Cambridgeshire and Hampshire
- Thomas Skelton House, Falmouth, Maine
- Thomas de Skelton, MP for Cumberland (UK Parliament constituency)
- Tom Skelton, character in the film 92 in the Shade

== See also ==
- Thomas Shelton (disambiguation), often alternative spelling for Skelton in medieval/early modern period
