= J. B. Owens Pottery Company =

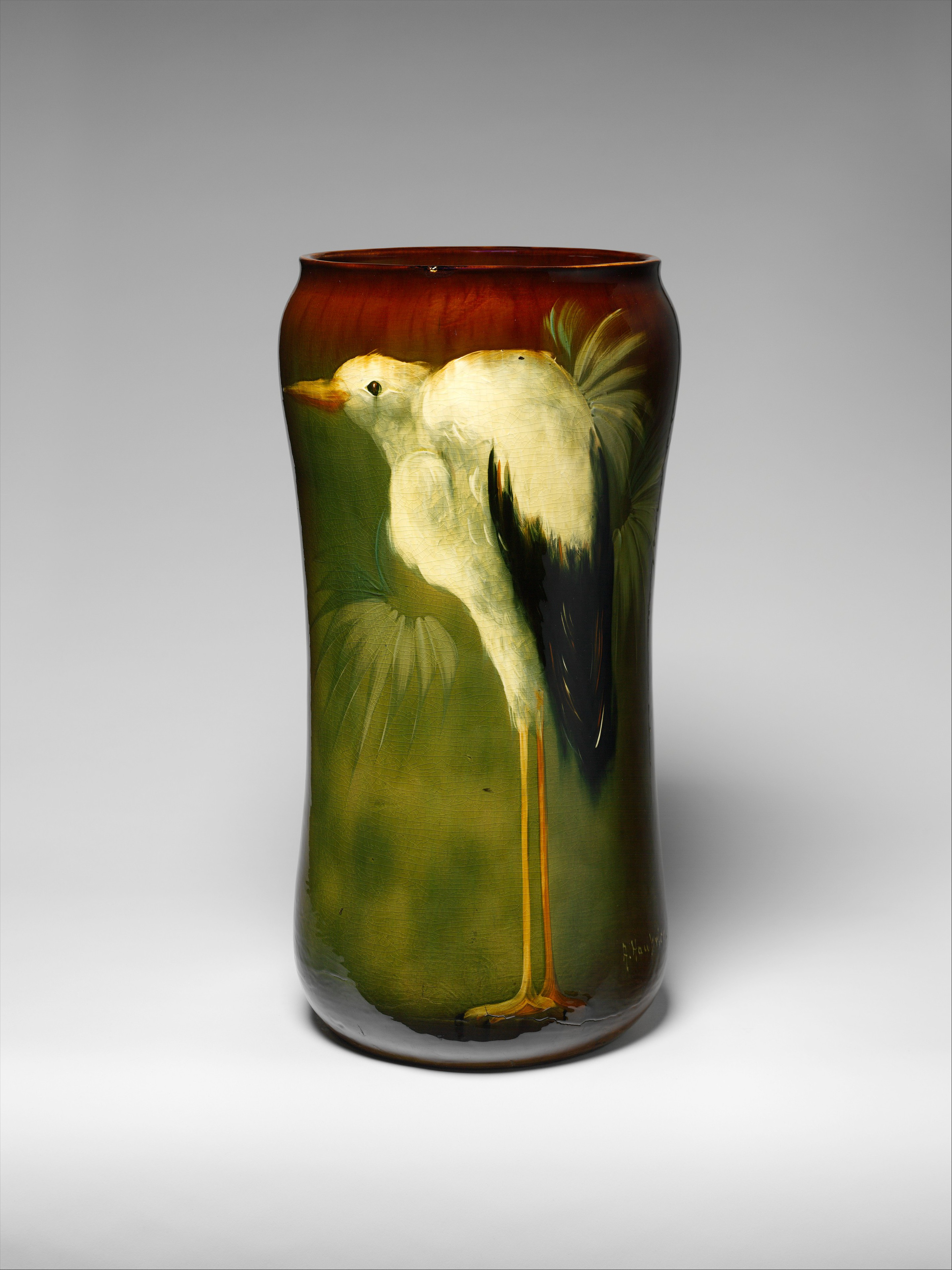
Umbrella Stand, c. 1896

The J. B. Owens Pottery Company, informally known as Owens Pottery, was an American art pottery and tile company that flourished for a few years around the turn of the 20th century.

== History ==
Owens Pottery was founded by J. B. Owens in Roseville, Ohio, in 1885. In 1891 it moved to Zanesville, where Owens built a new factory on a site with its own rail spur. It began producing art pottery in 1896, when it introduced the Utopian line with botanical decorations under a brown glaze. All told, it produced some four dozen different lines of art pottery, with types ranging from vases, bowls, and pitchers to umbrella stands and lamps. Popular lines included Utopian, Lightweight, Lotus, Henri Deux, and Matte Green. Especially distinctive lines include Red Flame (featuring slip decoration under a red glaze), Mission (depicting Spanish missions), and Coralene (featuring small bead decorations).

The pottery won awards and was often compared to the work of rivals like Rookwood Pottery, Roseville Pottery, and Weller Pottery, all of which were also based in Ohio. Potters who were associated with Owens Pottery over the years include Albert Radford, W. A. Long (who founded Lonhuda), Frank Ferrell, Karl Langenbeck, John J. Herold, Herb Hugo, and John Lessell.

A fire destroyed most of the Zanesville factory in 1902, but Owens rebuilt on the same site and took the opportunity to double in size to 11 kilns. Around the same time, Owens bought the New York–based American Art-Ceramic Company.

In 1905, Owens Pottery began making tiles, and this line quickly grew to dominate production, with the result that the Zanesville Tile Company was incorporated to handle this end of the business. Around 1907 Owens sold most of his stake in both companies, only to buy them back by 1909 after other investors pushed the tile business into receivership. Shortly thereafter, he set up a new company, J. B. Owens Floor & Wall Tile, with a new factory across the street from his former operations. For a few years the new company made both art pottery and tiles, but within a few years it stopped producing art pottery altogether. The company name was changed again, to the Empire Floor and Wall Tile Company. Owens also had stakes in other ceramic companies in Ohio and New Jersey, and he was awarded over 20 patents, most of them related to the design for a tunnel kiln.

The Empire factory burned in 1928 and Owens effectively went out of business the following year, though his companies were involved in lawsuits for several more decades.
