= T. B. Townsend =

American businessman (1837–1916)

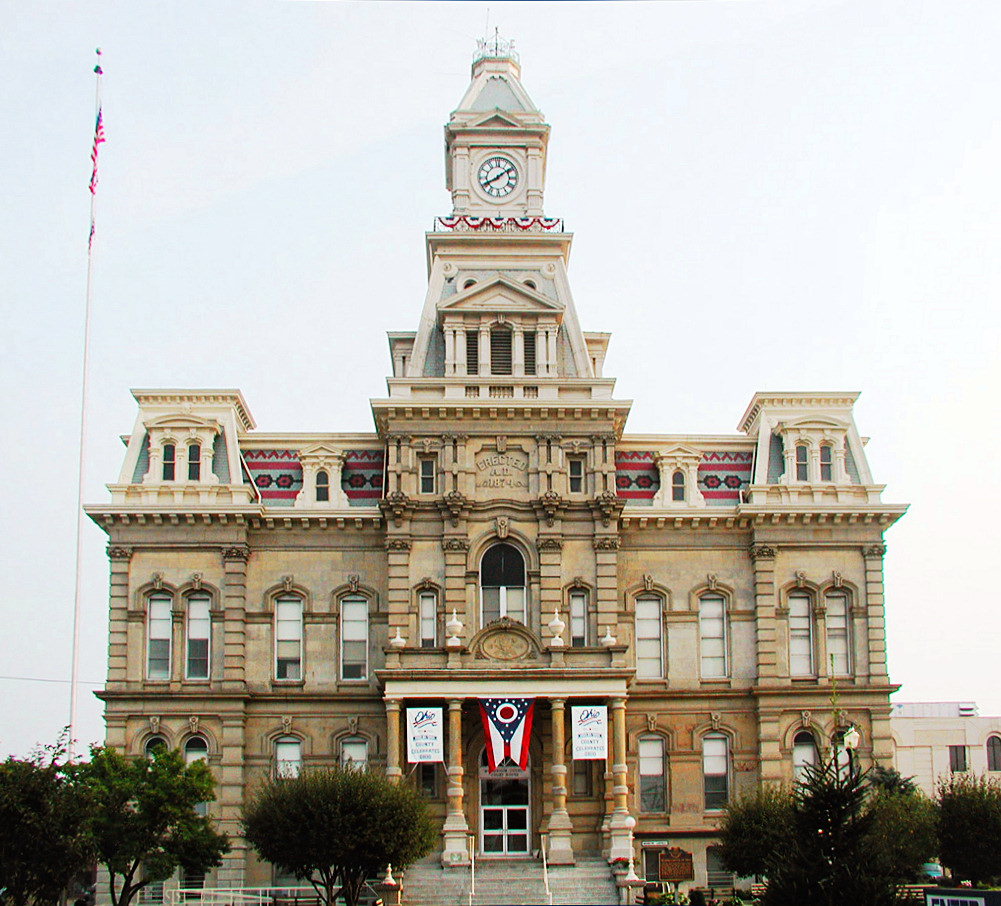
Muskingum County Courthouse in Zanesville, Ohio

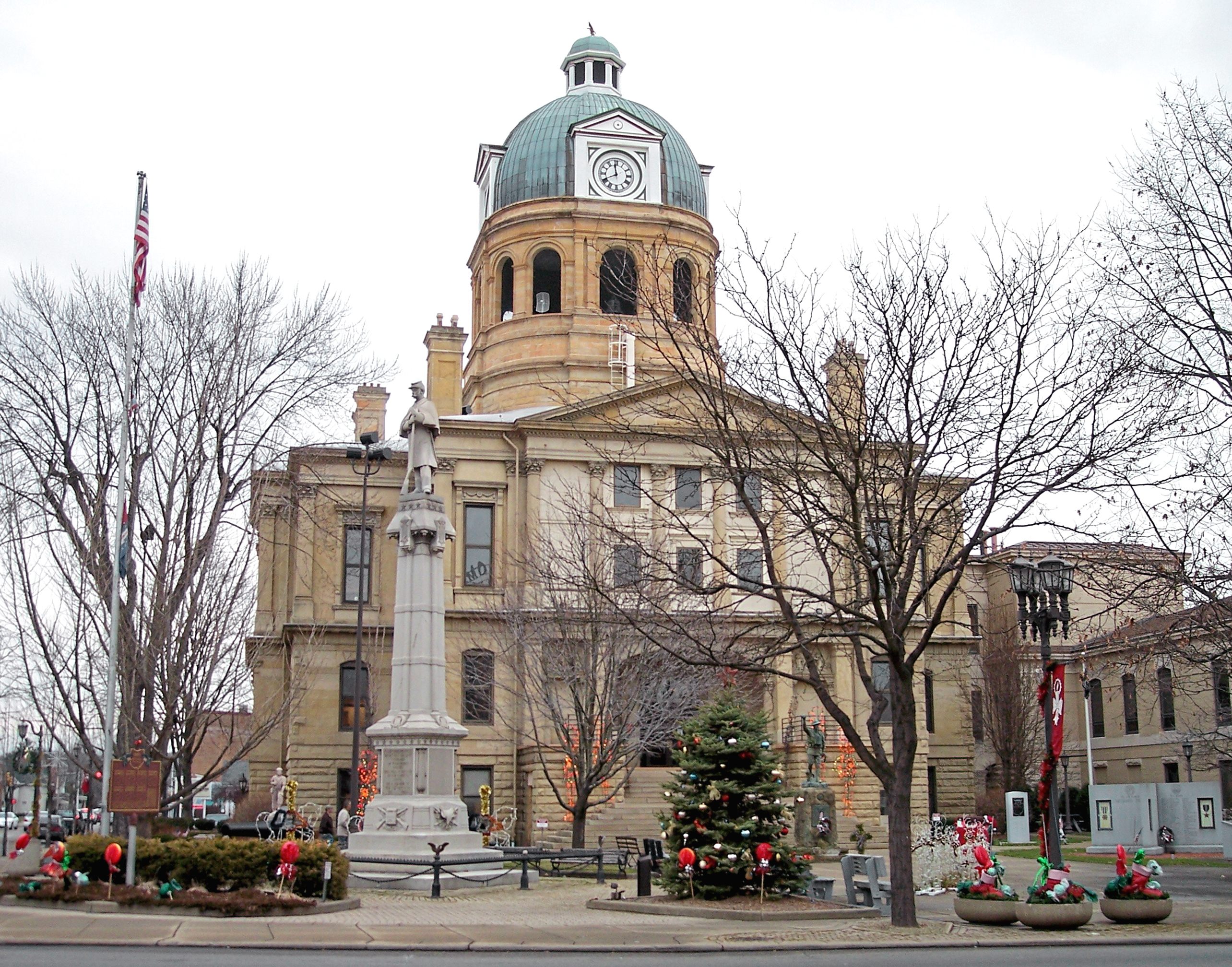
Tuscarawas County Courthouse

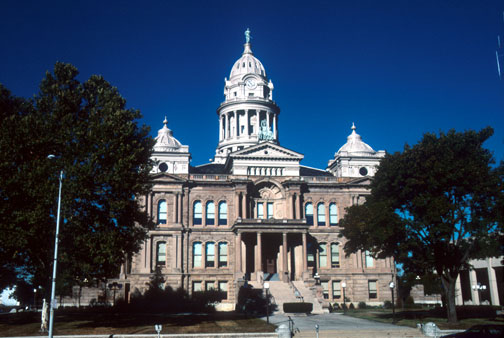
Miami County Courthouse in Troy, Ohio

Thomas Burgess Townsend, known as T.B. Townsend, (1837–1916) was a brick manufacturer, a building Contractor, and owned a cattle ranch in Kansas. Born in Pittsburgh, Pennsylvania, 8 September 1837, he made Zanesville, Ohio his home. He was president of T. B. Townsend Brick and Contracting Co. in Zanesville, Ohio, claimed to be the largest brick factory in Ohio at the time. He founded one of "the most extensive and well-improved farms" in Peabody, Marion County, Kansas, in the 1880s, called Rockland Farm, better known as the Townsend Ranch.

== Background ==
Townsend was born in Pittsburgh, Pennsylvania, in 1837 and moved to Beverly, Ohio in 1846. He and Sybil A. Milton wed in Washington, Ohio on 23 September 1858. They moved in 1867 to Zanesville where they had three children: Orville (b.1860), Hatty (b.1862), and Mary (b.1872.) His properties included the sprawling 2,500 acre Townsend Ranch he established in 1886 in Peabody, Marion County, Kansas.

The Townsends did not live at this ranch but stayed in Zanesville, Ohio, where Sybil died in 1913 and he died 24 November 1916.

== Building career ==
Townsend became a mason and then a contractor and builder at the age of 21. He built several stores, dwellings, courthouses, railroads, sewers, and bridges. His works include the Muskingum County Courthouse, Wood County Courthouse, Guernsey County Courthouse, Tuscarawas County Courthouse, Miami County Courthouse, and the Arlington Hotel (since demolished).

Brick was in high demand for use as pavers (including at the "Brickyard" racetrack Indianapolis Motor Speedway) in the early 20th century, and Townsend's bricks are collected along with other historic examples at "Redbud Alley" in Columbus, Ohio. Townsend was reported to have located a vein of clay 25 feet (7.6 m) thick which he used to make vitrified brick for street paving.

== Townsend Ranch, Peabody, Kansas ==
Townsend established the livestock ranch in 1886 when he and his wife purchased 300 acres near Peabody from the Atchison Topeka and Santa Fe Railroad. He realized a need for access to the railroad, not only for incoming freight but also for loading and shipping of livestock to eastern markets. Townsend deeded a 1.5-acre parcel to the railroad company for a siding and stockyards. To this nucleus was added a store, post office, hotel, depot, and the office of Townsend Cattle Ranch. The village became known as the Horners. In all the Townsend Ranch comprised some 2,500 acres. That represented four of Caitlin Township's 36 sections, 640 acres each. The Townsends did not live there, rather the ranch was overseen by Hans Johnson, a Dane.

In 1887, the large, limestone barn was constructed. Measuring 80 by 140 feet, it was completed in a year using locally quarried materials and cost $10,000. The barn has a basement with a rock floor. The barn walls are plastered with lime and sand, and large timbers support the interior framework. The beams are connected with wooden pegs, producing fine-fitting joints. Ventilation ducts installed in the outside walls from basement to eaves provided ventilation for hay stored in the barn. Grain was stored in second-floor bins. The basement was used for grinders and power units for grinding. It also provided shelter for hogs.

At one time, a large wooden windmill with a wooden wheel was used to provide power for grinding grain and pumping water. It stood to the west of the stone barn along with a wooden water storage tank. The water was piped from the tank to feedlots for cattle and hogs.

In 1901 the ranch was described in the local paper as having a carriage house, horse barn, granary, an "immense" cattle barn, a store, dwelling house for operator, and four houses "for the men that work on the ranch". Townsend also owned stockyards and the office of the Townsend Cattle Co. Townsend raised cattle including stockers and feeders, as well as hogs.

The Townsend Ranch was a model progressive farm, a site admired by railroad passengers rolling through it, and it was a major employer in Marion County.

The Townsend family sold the farm in 1937.
