= Emma Cadwalader-Guild =

American sculptor and painter (1843–1911)

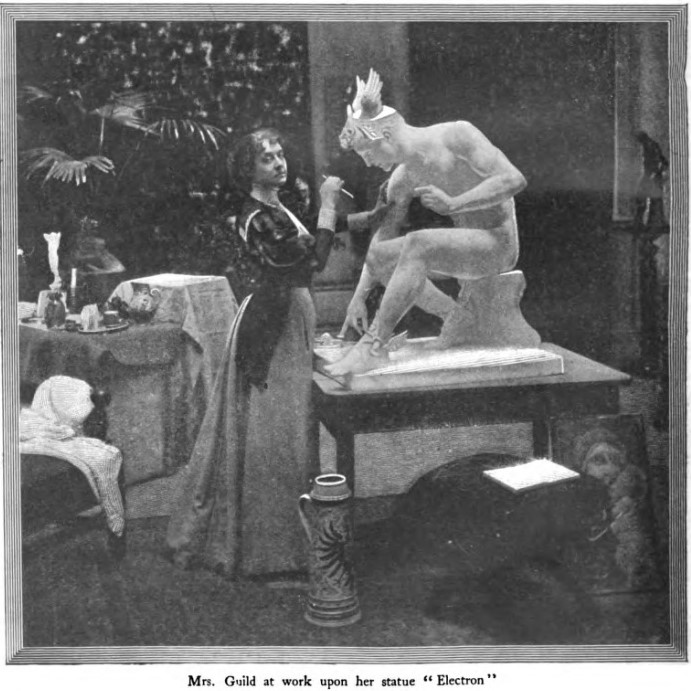
- Born: August 27, 1843; Zanesville, Ohio
- Died: c. 1911
- Other names: Emma Cadwalader-Guild
- Occupation: Artist
- Known for: Portrait busts of significant figures
- Spouse: Edward Chipman Guild (Oct. 8, 1861-Nov. 6, 1899)

Emma Marie Cadwalader-Guild, also spelled Cadwallader-Guild (August 27, 1843 – c. 1911) was an American sculptor and painter, notable for her portrait busts of figures such as President William McKinley, Andrew Carnegie, and George Frederick Watts, as well other sculptures. She worked primarily in marble and bronze, and her works were exhibited at the Royal Academy of Arts, the 1894 Paris Salon, the 1876 Philadelphia Centennial Exposition, and the 1904 Louisiana Purchase Exposition, where she won a bronze medal. Cadwalader-Guild spent much of her career abroad and was particularly well known in England and Germany.

== Life and career ==
Cadwalader-Guild was born in Zanesville, Ohio in 1843. Her father, a doctor, was a member of the English Cadwallader family, and her name was spelled both Cadwalader and Cadwallader during her lifetime. Her mother painted with oils and watercolors, and Cadwalader-Guild herself showed an early interest in art. On October 8, 1861, she married Reverend Edward Chipman Guild of the Unitarian church. The pair had two children, Eliza and Rose.

After her marriage, Cadwalader-Guild and her husband lived in Waltham, Massachusetts, near Boston, where she spent time with local artists in their studios and attended William Rimmer's lectures on anatomy. Otherwise she had little formal training and was largely self-taught. She is said to have completed a lifesize David in clay in 1875, and her first recorded exhibition was in 1876 at the Women's Pavilion of the Philadelphia Centennial Exhibition.

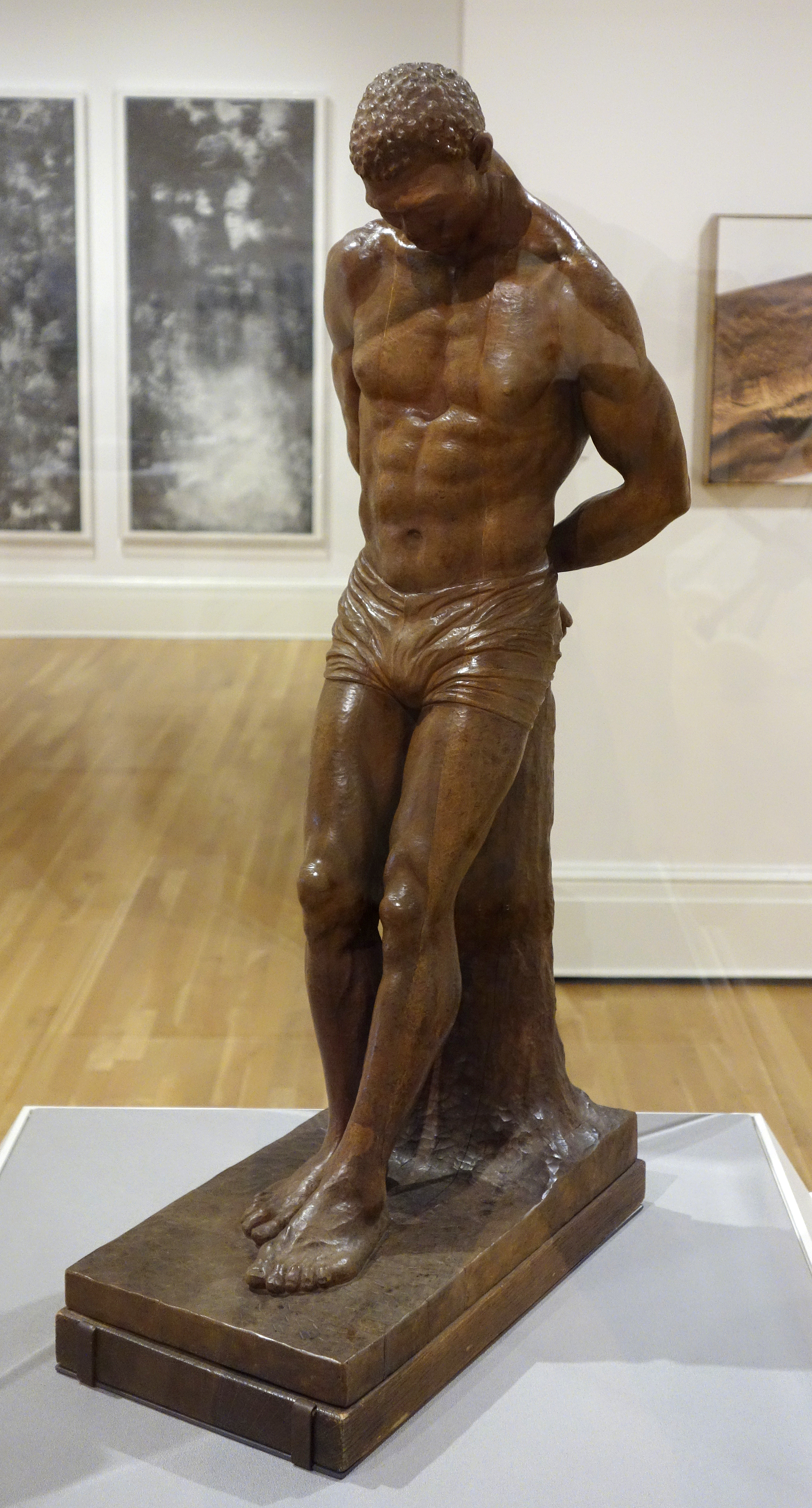
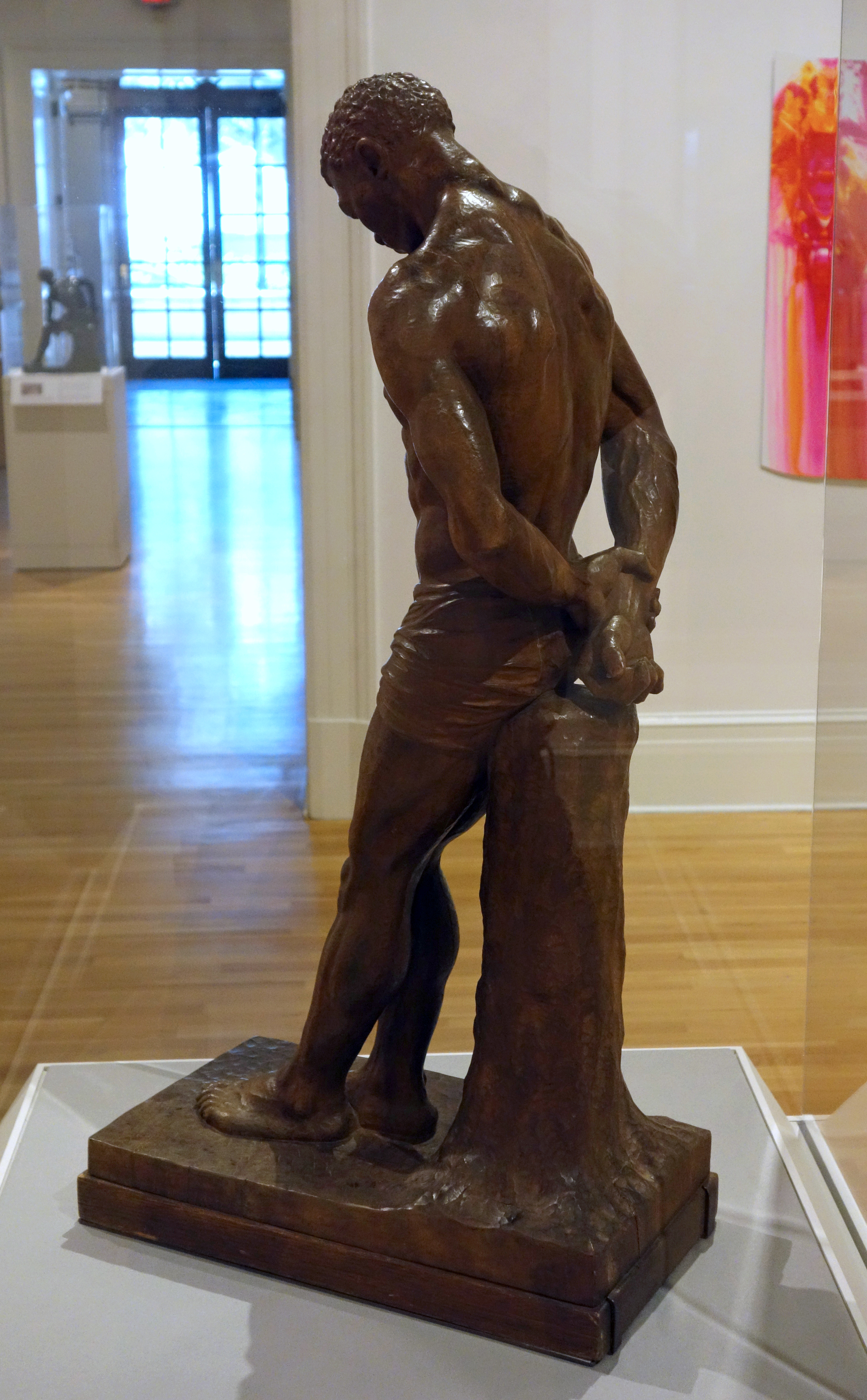
Free (1876)
(copy by Otto Braun, c. 1911)

One of Cadwalader-Guild's earliest works was a statue of an emancipated slave, created in 1876 and entitled Free. According to a frequently repeated story, which first appeared in a profile of the artist in 1904, the inspiration for the work came from her encounter with a dejected African-American man at the Boston market. After spending weeks creating a clay model of the man, she arranged for it to be cast in bronze in Italy. Although the original bronze has been lost, the composition of the sculpture is known from a copy in wood carved by German sculptor Otto Braun. In Braun's copy, the half-nude man leans against a tree trunk with his head down; his hands, held behind his back, are unbound, but from the front his posture suggests that he is still in chains. The ambivalence of the figure has been interpreted as a reflection of the lasting psychological effects of slavery and the ambiguous position of emancipated slaves in the Reconstruction era.

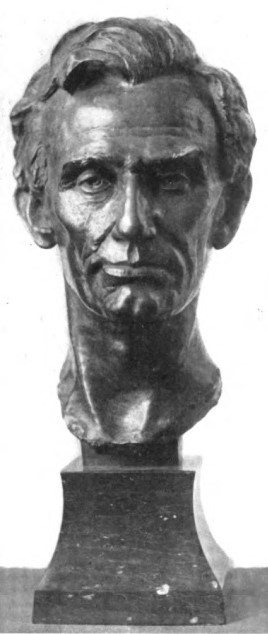
Bronze bust of Abraham Lincoln

Portraiture was her primary subject matter; however, Cadwalader-Guild did create other forms. Her historical subjects include an Endymion in marble and a corresponding bronze statuette, a marble bust of Lotos/Lotus, a bust of the Head of St. Monica, the mother of St. Augustine, a marble figure of Electron/Electro/Elektron, and Psyche. Her historical subjects were praised for their originality and craftsmanship. She was also known for working without models.

Though her primary work was sculpture, she also painted, though mostly without patronage. Her focus was on still lives and landscapes. She also painted a series of oil sketches. Cadwalader-Guild often had showings of her work in her studio.

Once Free was completed, Cadwalader-Guild moved abroad in the mid-1880s, exhibiting and working in multiple cities. She placed Free in her London studio, where it was well-received by critics. She traveled and study the masters of art and opened studios in cities with strong art communities, including London, Berlin, Italy, and Frankfurt, to increase the profitability of her travels. While in Europe, she produced pieces that were well-received and brought her recognition including marble and bronze busts of British Prime Minister William Gladstone, who contacted her for in-person sittings, something he had not done with any other sculptor.

She returned to the United States at an unknown date to make a bust of President McKinley at the encouragement of then-United States Ambassador Andrew White. Cadwalader-Guild had long wanted to create a study of her fellow Ohioan. However, McKinley did not arrive to the scheduled sittings in the summer due to the campaign of 1900. She returned to Berlin and came back to the United States the following summer to meet McKinley in Canton, Ohio where he was staying. Again McKinley was too busy to pose for sittings but promised to sit for her when he returned to Washington D.C. in October. However, McKinley was assassinated in September 1901 and Cadwalader-Guild made the bust from photographs. Congress purchased the bust for $2,000. It was placed in the President's Room in the Capitol and moved to the Senate Marble Room in 2000.

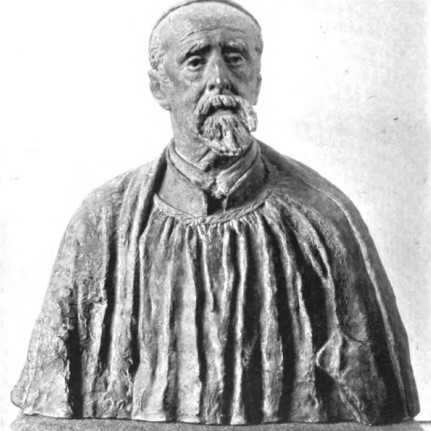
Bronze bust of G. F. Watts

From 1885 to 1888 her primary address was in London. The Royal Academy in London listed her 1888 address as in Frankfurt and in 1891, Hamburg, and in 1893, Berlin. The 1894 Paris Salon listed a London address. By 1897 she had relocated the majority of her work to Berlin where her work consisted mostly of portraiture of nobility. At the 1904 Louisiana Purchase Exposition she is listed as still working in Berlin. Prior to December 1905 Cadwalader-Guild purportedly spent several years in England. During this time she made her busts of Gladstone and other notable figures including royalty. Another report attests that prior to March 1905 Cadwalader-Guild spent several years in Berlin before returning to America to work in the Bryant Park Building. At that time she was working on the bust of an unknown but prominent New York resident.

Cadwalader-Guild died on April 16 1916 at an age of 72 in Berlin.

== Notable work and exhibitions ==
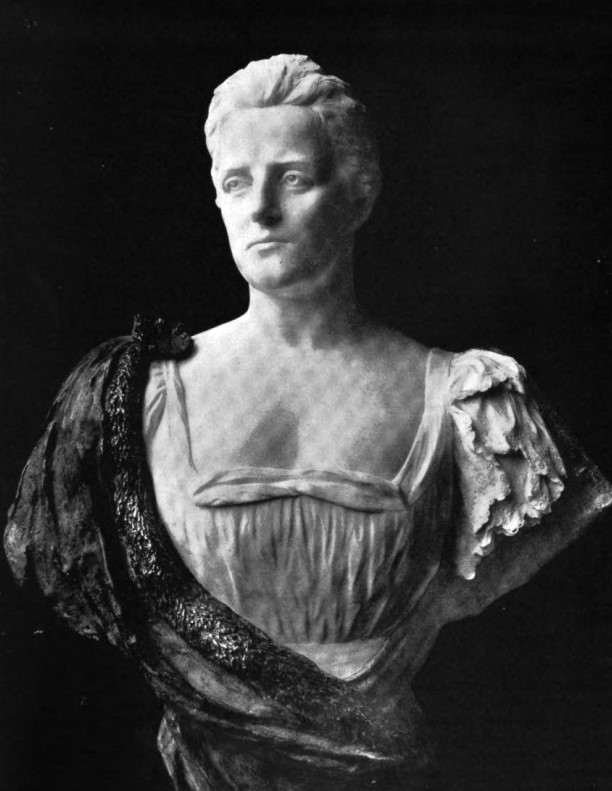
Bronze and marble bust of Princess Helene of Saxe-Altenburg

Cadwalader-Guild exhibited at the Royal Academy multiple times throughout her career. She exhibited her bronze statuette Free in 1885; a still life painting in 1886; and two busts in 1887, one of the inventor Peter Brotherhood, and the other of British politician Frederick Seager Hunt. At the Royal Academy in 1888 she had a bronze portrait medallion and a bust of the Rev. Canon Wilberforce exhibited, in 1891 a bronze bust of an Indian rider, in 1893 her busts of the artist George Frederick Watts, Esq. R.A. and of Henry Shore, Esq., and in 1898 her bronze statuette Endymion.

Cadwalader-Guild also exhibited at the Glaspalast in Munich starting in 1883, the Paris Salon, the Glasgow Institute of Fine Arts, and at least twice at the Walker Art Gallery in Liverpool, once with her bronze Endymion in 1891 and again in 1893 with her busts of Henry Thode, Esq. and G. F. Watts. At the Louisiana Purchase Exposition Cadwalader-Guild had five pieces exhibited; her bust of G. F. Watts, her marble Endymion, her bust of Joseph Joachim, her bust of Lincoln, and her sculpture of Electron. At the Paris Salon two pieces were exhibited in 1894, Free and a plaster bust called Tramonto.

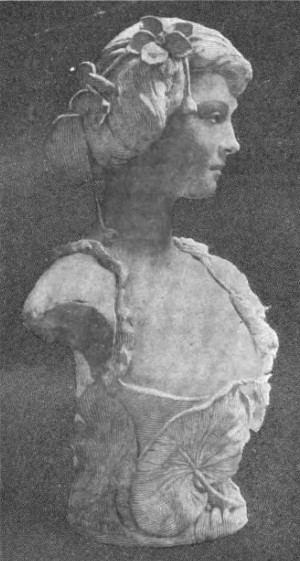
Lotus (marble, 1904)

=== List of known notable subjects ===
- President William McKinley, 1901, bronze bust, 74.9 by 47 by 36.8 centimeters; currently at the Senate Marble Room at the United States Capitol
- Andrew Carnegie, 1908, bronze bust, Civil Engineers Club of New York
- Henry Edward Manning, 1892, plaster relief
- George Frederick Watts, 1891, bronze bust, 61.2 by 60.5 by 35.8 centimeters, exhibited at the Royal Academy in 1893 and the 1904 Louisiana Purchase Exposition, currently at the Whitworth Art Gallery of the University of Manchester
- Peter Brotherhood, bronze bust, exhibited at the Royal Academy in 1887 and marble bust; the bronze bust was sold at auction in November 2017, the marble's location is unknown
- Frederick Seager Hunt, bronze bust, exhibited at the Royal Academy in 1887
- President Abraham Lincoln, 1904, bronze bust, exhibited at the 1904 Louisiana Purchase Exposition
- Princess Helena of the United Kingdom, also known as Princess Christian of Schleswig-Holstein, 1889, terracotta bust, location currently unknown
- William Ewart Gladstone, 1905, two busts, one bronze and one marble, location currently unknown
- Princess Irene of Hesse and by Rhine, also known as Princess Henry of Prussia, 1905, marble bust, location currently unknown; 1904, bronze bust and a statuette of Princess Irene and her son Prince Henry, locations currently unknown
- Duchess Helene of Mecklenburg-Strelitz, also known as Princess Helene of Saxe-Altenburg, 1897, mixed media marble and bronze bust; 1902, marble bust
- Frau von Roth, bust in bronze and marble
- Henry Thode, 1894, plaster bust
- Hans Thoma, 1894, bronze bust
- Joseph Joachim, 1895, marble bust, exhibited at the 1904 Louisiana Purchase Exposition
- Feilx Weingartner, 1896, bronze and plaster busts
- Wilhelmina of the Netherlands, bust in marble
- General Samuel C. Armstrong, 1905, bronze bust, gifted to the Hampton Institute
- Conrad von Studt, 1903, bronze bust, originally at University of Münster, current location unknown
- Reverend Canon Wilberforce, bust, exhibited at the Royal Academy in 1888
- Henry Shore, Esq., bust, exhibited at the Royal Academy in 1893
- Paderewski, 1896, bronze relief
- Baron von Rheinbaben

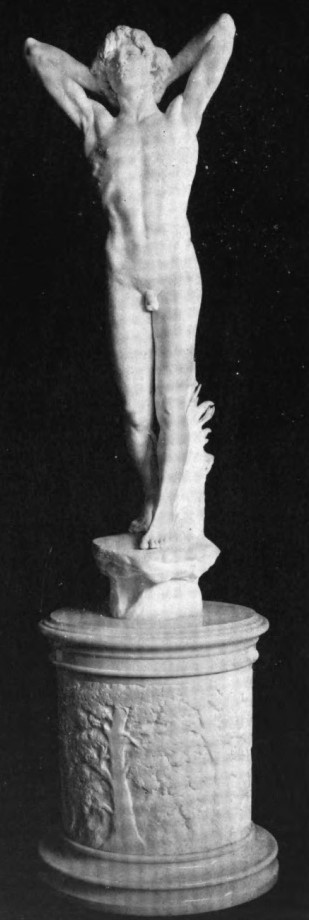
Endymion (marble, 1886)

=== Other known works ===
==== Sculpture ====
- Free, 1876, bronze statuette, exhibited at the Glaspalast in 1883, the Royal Academy in 1885, and the Paris Salon in 1894; location currently unknown. A copy in basswood by German artist Otto Braun is currently at the Crystal Bridges Museum of American Art
- Endymion, 1886, marble statue, exhibited at the 1904 Louisiana Purchase Exposition; location currently unknown
- Endymion, 1896, bronze statuette, 33.8 centimeters, exhibited at Royal Academy in 1898, sold at auction in February 2018
- Lotos/Lotus, 1904, marble bust, location currently unknown
- Head of St. Monica, the mother of St. Augustine, 1905, mixed media of marble and bronze, location currently unknown
- Tramonto, a plaster bust, exhibited at the Paris Salon in 1894, location currently unknown
- Electron/Elektron/Electro, 1895, a bronze and a marble statue, the bronze statue given to the German postmaster general Heinrich von Stephan by the Society of the Electrical and Electrochemical Industry of Frankfurt and placed at the Imperial Postal Museum in Berlin, today Museum für Kommunikation Berlin, second exhibited at the 1904 Louisiana Purchase Exposition, location of the bronze Elektron at the Museum für Kommunikation Frankfurt
- David, 1875, clay sculpture
- Psyche
- Ruberta
- Frond, 1894, alabaster bust
- Bronze portrait medallion, exhibited at the Royal Academy in 1888
- Indian Rider, bronze bust, exhibited at the Royal Academy in 1891

==== Painting ====
- Still life, exhibited at the Royal Academy in 1886
- A series of oil sketches of unknown subjects

== Reception ==
The reception to Cadwalader-Guild's work was positive. Her sculpture Lotos was lauded in the German Times as, "This psychic masterpiece stamps Mrs. Guild unequivocally as an artist of the very first rank."

Cadwalader-Guild's bust of Joseph Joachim was also complimented by the German Times, saying, "[the bust is] by far the best and most significant work accomplished by any of the small army of sculptors who have been moved to do the violin-patriarch's characteristic head."

Her marble study of Wilhelmina of the Netherlands so impressed Empress Augusta Victoria that when she saw it on public display, she ordered it to be taken to the palace. Princess Sophia of Saxe-Weimar, Wilhelmina's aunt, had Cadwalader-Guild make a duplicate as a coronation gift for Wilhelmina.

United States politician John Hay described her bust of President McKinley as, "The power of the head is remarkable. It is a great expression of the personality of the man."

In an article about Cadwalader-Guild the Boston Evening Transcript wrote, "...the work of Mrs. Guild shows unmistakable talent and such as fresh, free spirit of originality that one can almost accept the alleged dictum of Berlin that Mrs. Guild 'is the greatest genius in sculpture that America has ever had.'"

Her bronze statuette Endymion was complimented in the 1896 Studio International with, "...since the Italian bronzes of the Quattrocento no finer work of the kind has been seen than this." Similarly, upon the completion of her marble Endymion a complimentary piece was written in The International Studio which focused on the originality, pose, and composition of the sculpture.

An author for The International Studio wrote about the skill of her paintings in the journal's November 1897 to February 1898 volume, saying, "Mrs. Guild has a strong predilection for painting...which she does with no small degree of success, as her free and vigorous landscape studies abundantly testify...This pronounced feeling of hers for colour explains to me how in... her sculpture she employs means which really overstep the bounds of plastic art."
