= Wood County Courthouse and Jail =

Local government building in the United States

- U.S. National Register of Historic Places
- U.S. Historic district
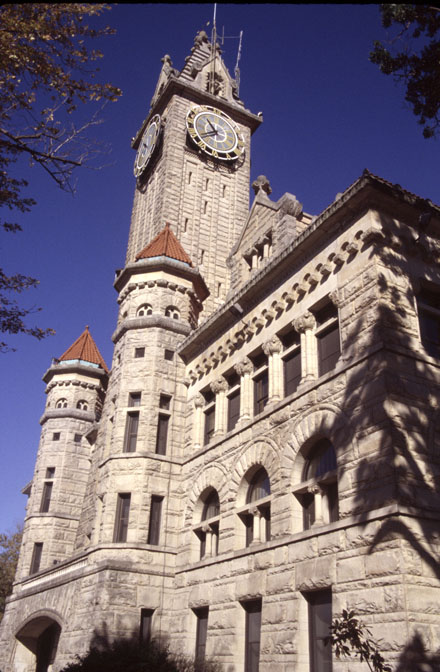
- Photo taken in 1999
- Interactive map of Wood County Courthouse and Jail
- Location: Bowling Green, Ohio
- Coordinates: 41°22′35″N 83°38′54″W
- Area: 24 acres (97,000 m^{2}), 2 buildings
- Built: 1894
- Architect: Yost & Packard; T.B. Townsend
- Architectural style: Romanesque
- NRHP reference No.: 74001651
- Added to NRHP: June 25, 1974

The Wood County Courthouse and Jail, located in Bowling Green, Ohio, United States, is Wood County's third courthouse. It was built after citizens decided to move the county seat from Perrysburg to Bowling Green. Ground was broken on November 28, 1893, and the cornerstone was laid on July 4, 1894. The architectural firm of Yost & Packard of Columbus designed the courthouse and construction was overseen by T.B. Townsend of Youngstown. The winning tender for the project was $153,803 and the final construction costs totaled $255,746.

The County Commissioners took possession of the new building on August 31, 1896, and the new Common Pleas Courtroom was dedicated on September 7, 1896.

== Construction ==
=== Materials ===
Sandstone from Amherst, Ohio, granite from Vermont, and marble from Italy were used in the construction of the courthouse. Architecturally, it is Richardsonian Romanesque in design with architectural sculpting throughout the building done by Whyte and Priest of Dayton, Ohio. To facilitate construction, a temporary railroad along pike street was established to the construction site. Ornate stained glass panels cover much of the ceiling on the third floor and are visible from ground level due to the large open staircase which ascends through the middle of the second floor. The staircase consists of polished marble steps with brass railings.

=== Clocktower ===
The clock tower rises to a height of 195 feet (59 m). At the time of its construction, the clock hands were the second largest in America spanning 16 feet (4.9 m) in diameter. They were only exceeded by the hands on the clock of the Chronicle newspaper building in San Francisco which were 16.5 feet (5.0 m) in diameter. The clock was made by the E. Howard & Co. at a cost of $3000. The clock tower bells weigh 2,000 lb (910 kg).

=== Artwork ===
Murals decorate the east and west walls of the third floor. The murals were painted by I. M. Taylor, who was the mayor of Bowling Green from 1911 to 1920. The east wall depicts Fort Meigs, a vital outpost in the War of 1812, and the west wall depicts a train passing through oil derricks in southern Wood County, a major producer of oil in the late 19th century.

=== Restorations ===
A major restoration of the interior of the courthouse was undertaken in 1980, and a restoration of the exterior of the building was completed in 2002.

== History ==
A recording of Ronald Reagan's Courthouse Speech

President William Howard Taft held a rally at the courthouse in 1912.

Jimmy Hoffa visited the courthouse on September 25, 1937 to get a marriage license, and married his wife in Bowling Green the same day.

President Ronald Reagan delivered a speech at the courthouse on October 19, 1988 to promote the candidacy of George H. W. Bush.

== Current use ==
=== Courts ===
There are two common pleas courtrooms and accompanying judicial offices located on the third floor as well as a jury assembly room, holding cell and conference rooms. A probate courtroom and judicial offices are located on the second floor, as is the Clerk of Courts Office. The first floor houses court security, court administration and a domestic relations courtroom with magistrates' offices and conference rooms. A five-story office building adjoining the courthouse contains a third common pleas courtroom and judicial offices as well as other county offices including the auditor, treasurer, engineer, commissioners, prosecutor, adult probation, building inspection and board of elections. A glass-enclosed atrium joining the courthouse and office building was completed in 2004. At that time existing entrances and exits to both buildings were closed and the atrium became the only public entrance to either building. It is staffed by court security who monitor people entering the buildings.

=== Clock Tower ===
The clock tower is still in use. The original chimes are in working order and ring the hour, every hour, by denoting one chime per hour. All four clockfaces are quite remarkable, with two layers of Roman numerals. The inner layer closest to the center is golden and can be viewed easily when in shade. The outer ring on numerals is painted black iron which is easily readable when in direct sunlight. The tower also contains a box designed for use by nesting falcons.

== The jail ==
Construction of the old Wood County Jail, located next to the courthouse, was begun on May 21, 1901, and completed in 1902 at a cost of $49,000. The Fremont firm of Fronizer and Andrews constructed the building, which continued in use as the county jail until 1990.

== Architecture Gallery ==
=== Exterior ===
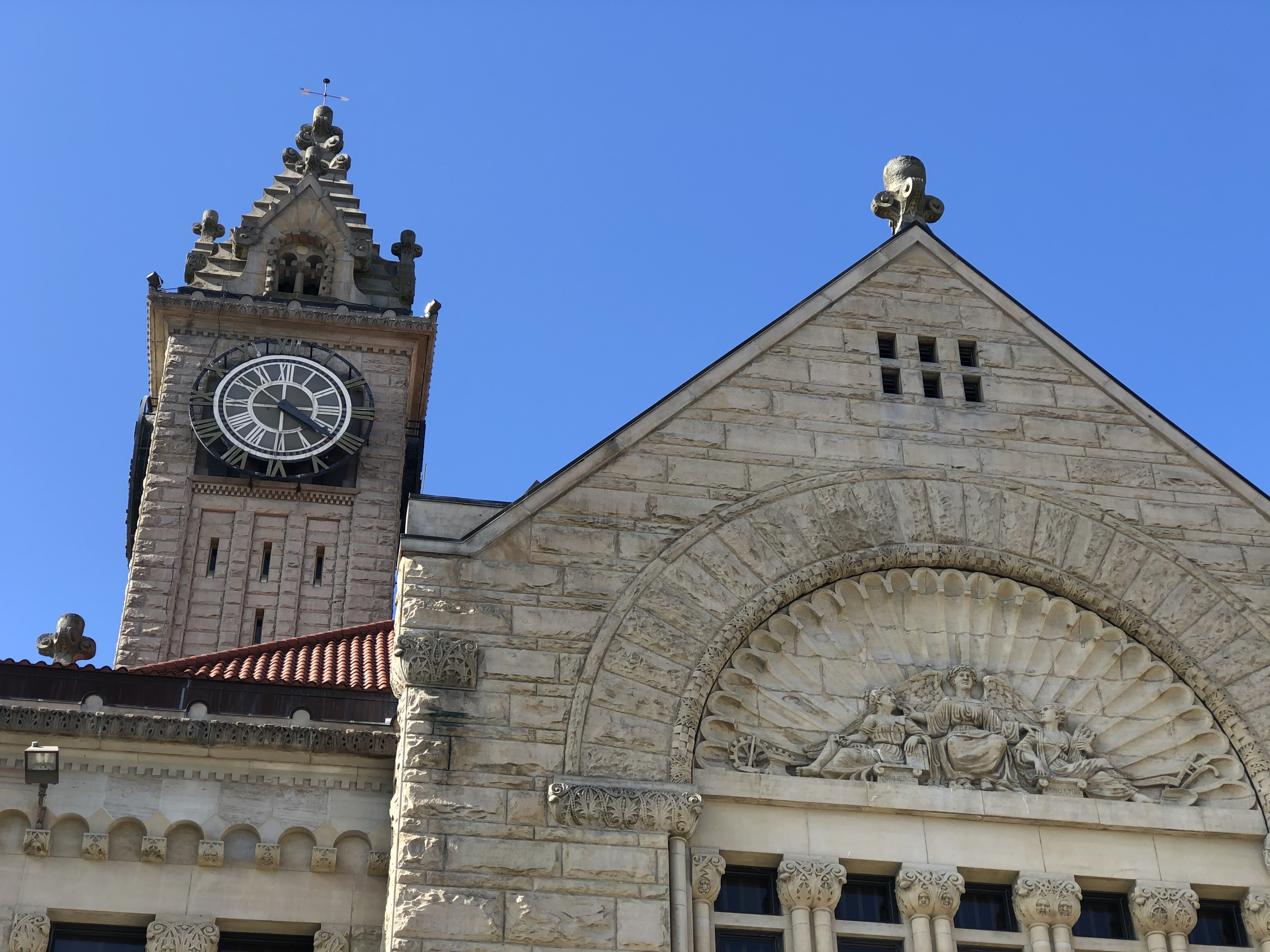
A side view of the building, featuring a carving of Justice, Agriculture, and Commerce.

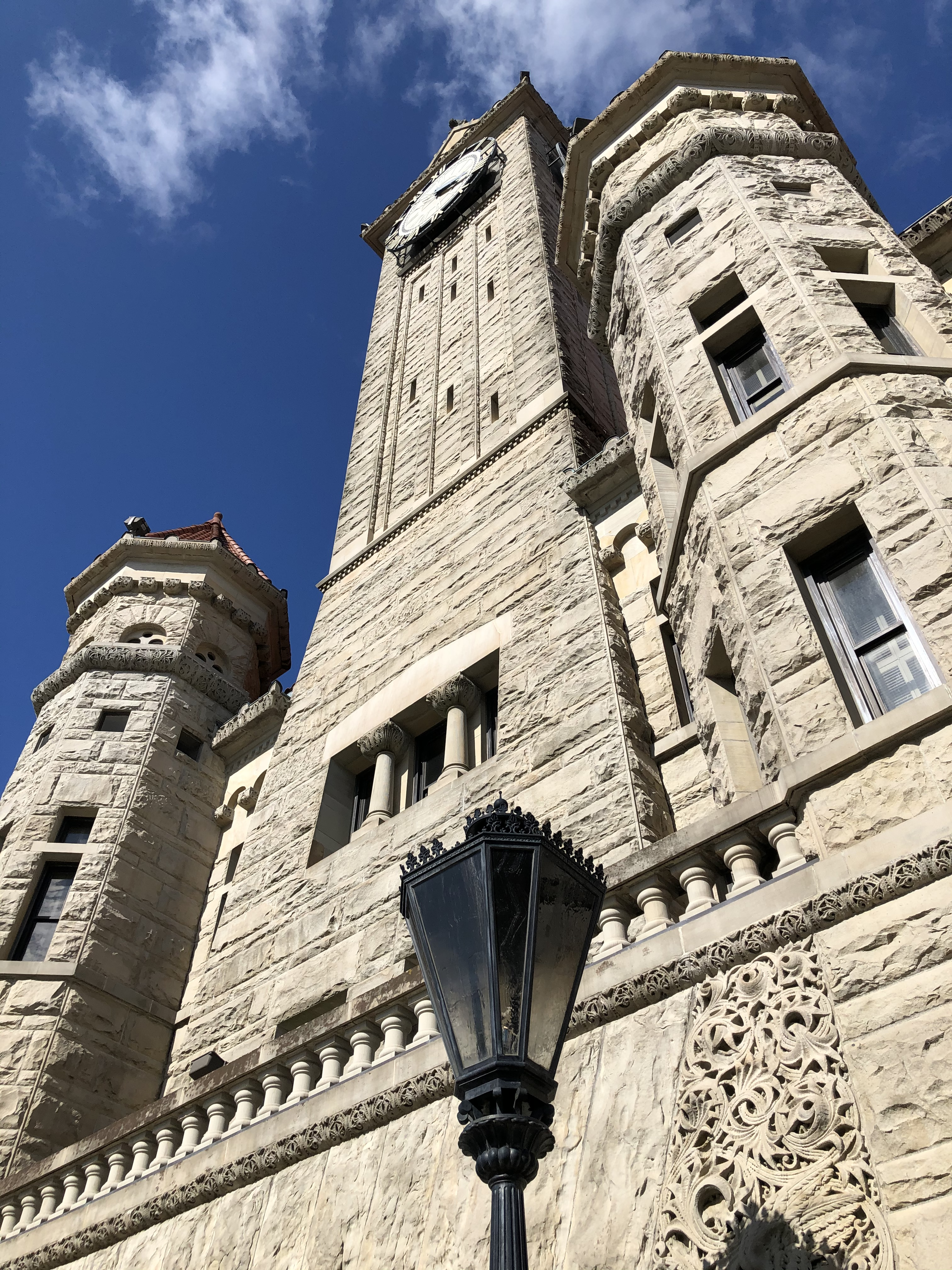
The front turrets, clock tower, and a gas lantern.

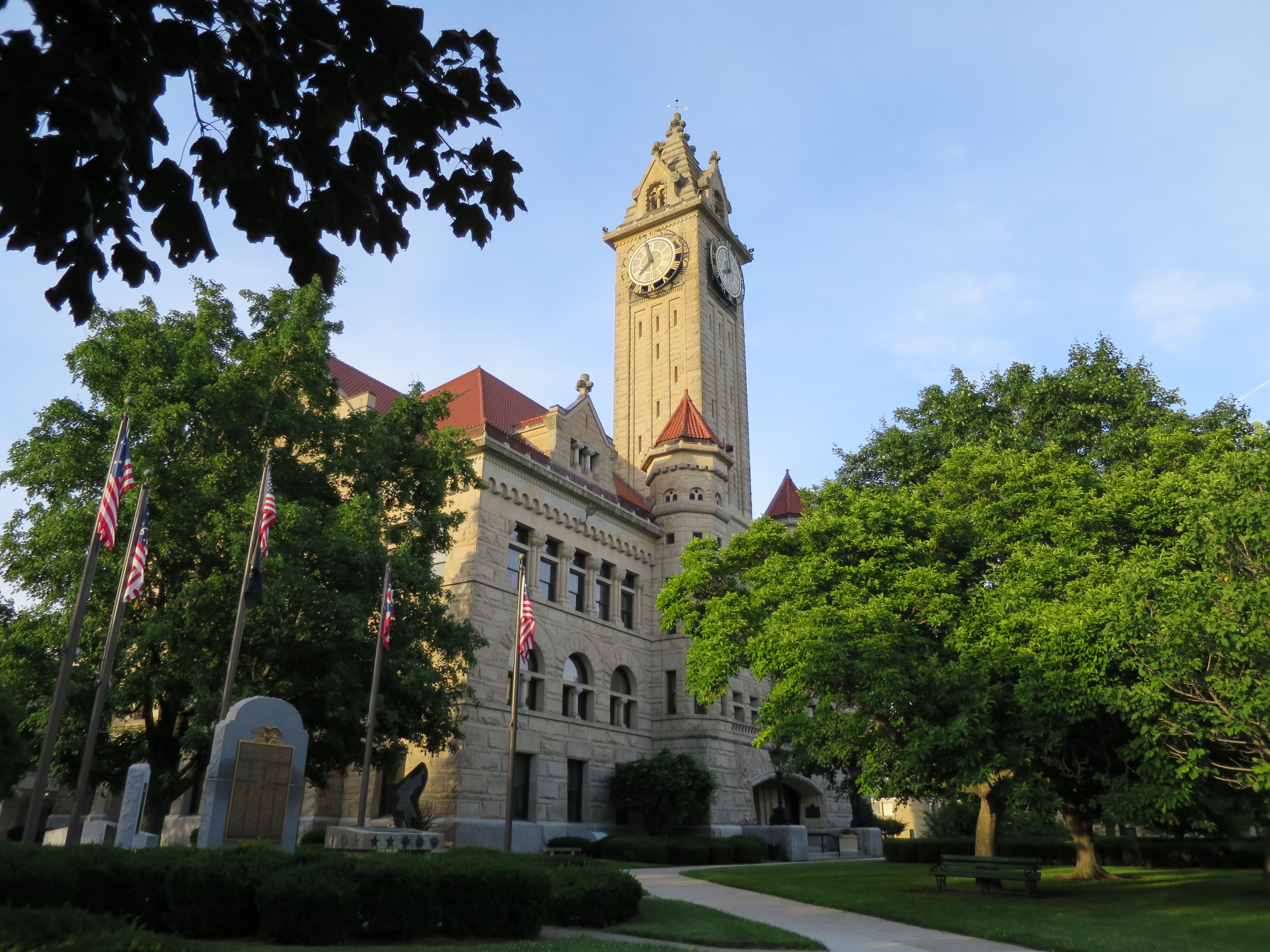
The courthouse grounds, with a war memorial visible.

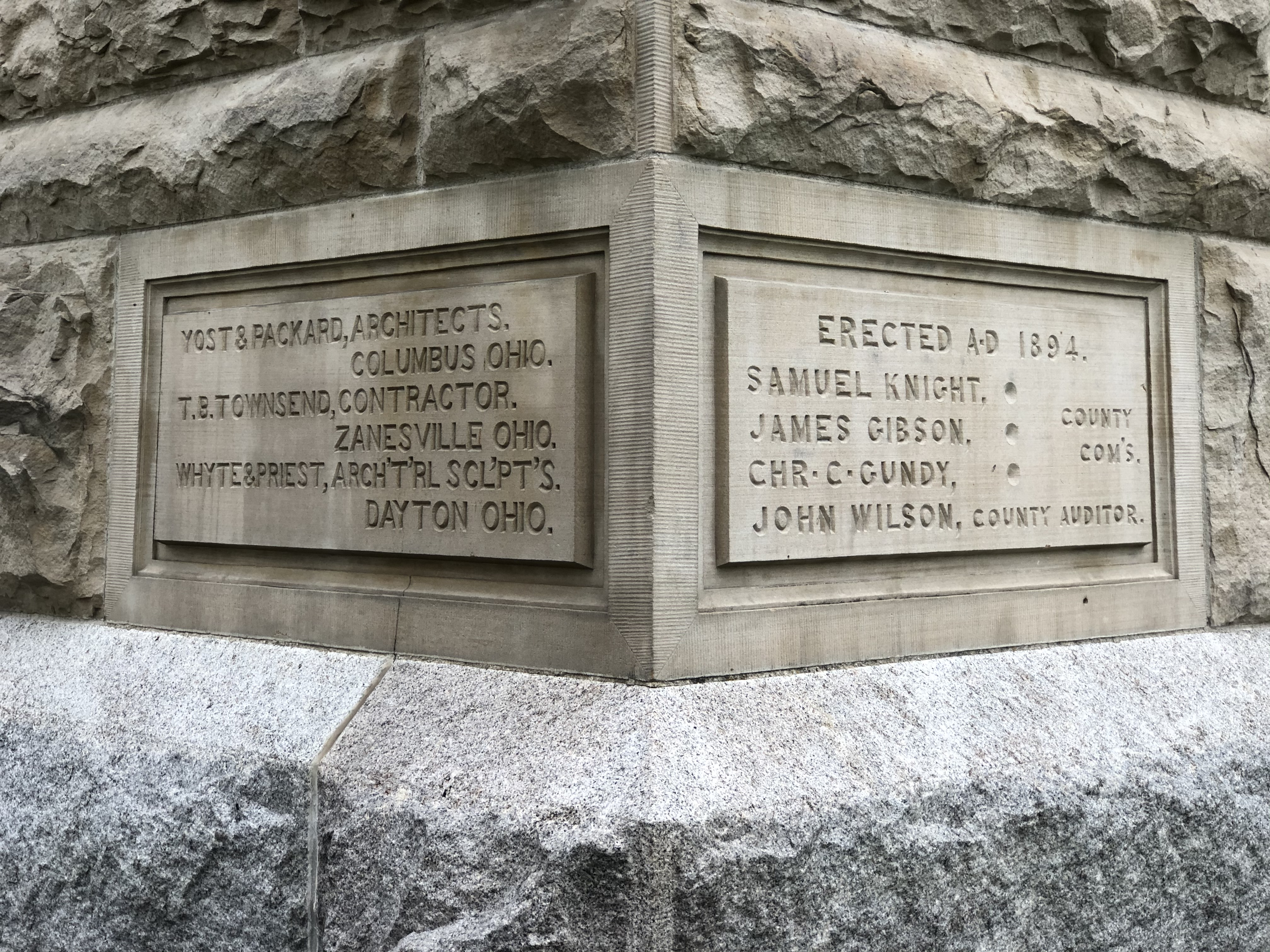
The Courthouse cornerstone

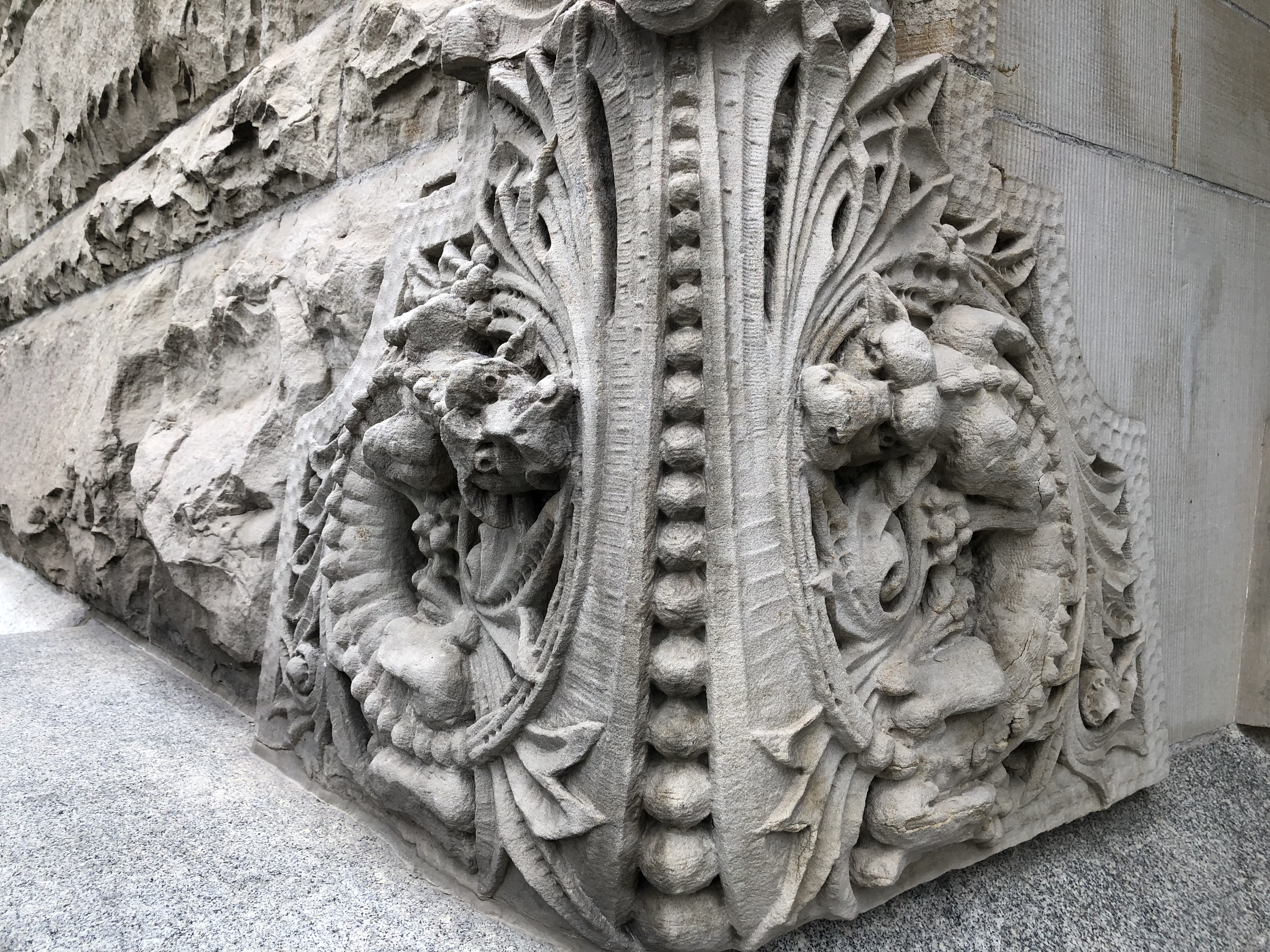
Carvings near the former main entrance showing Ouroboros.

=== Interior ===
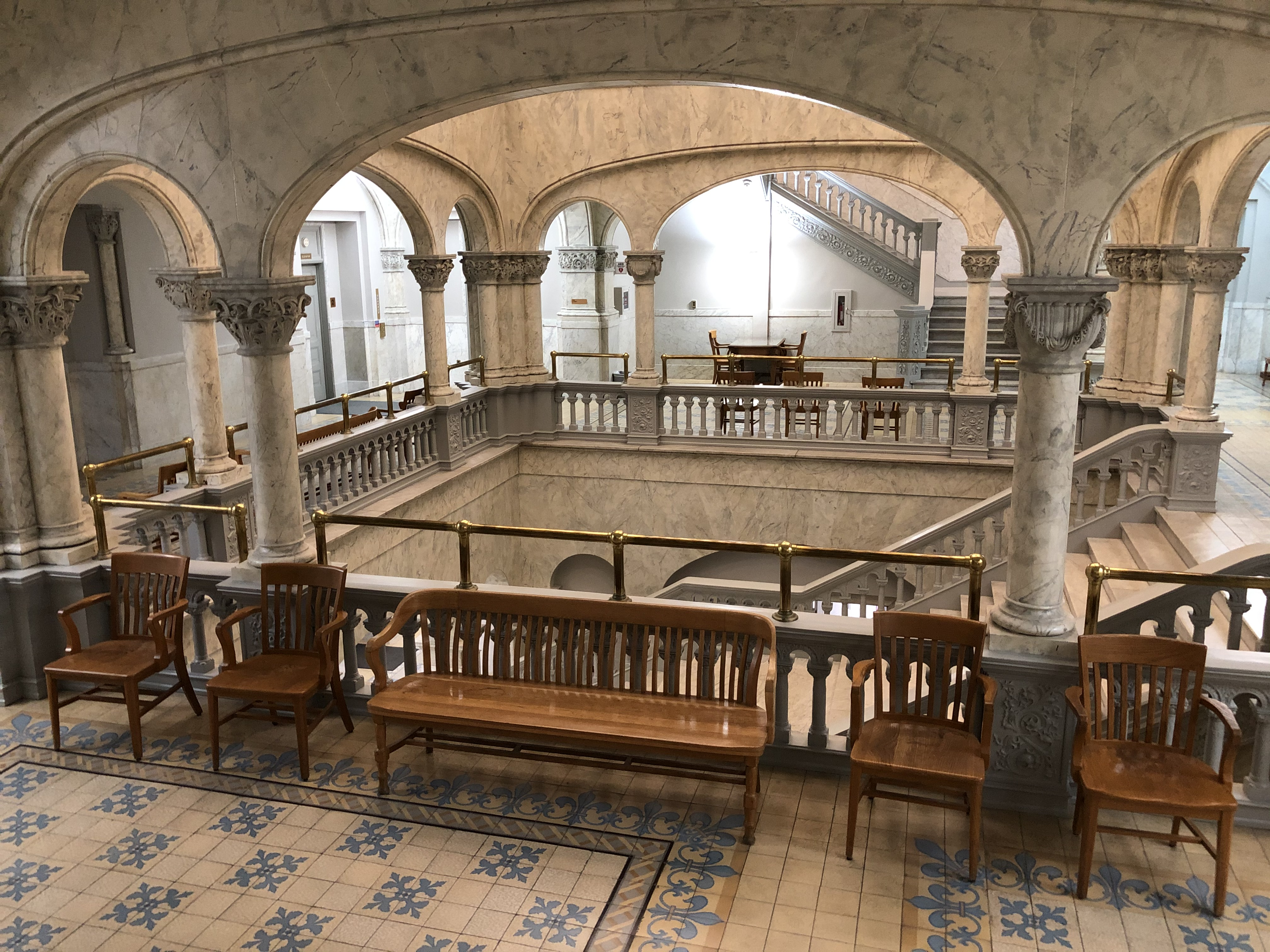
Interior next to the stairwell.

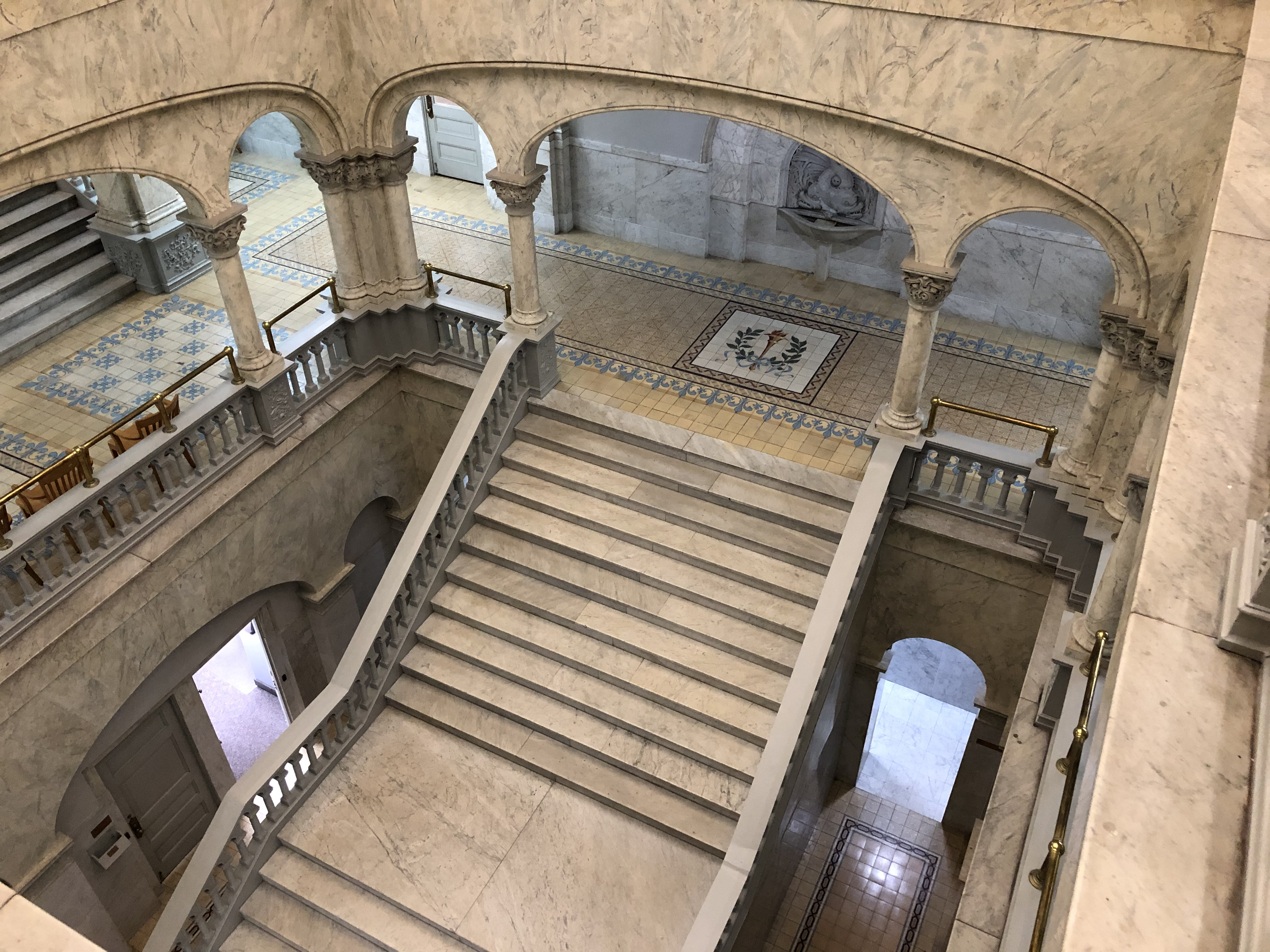
The central stairwell, looking downwards.

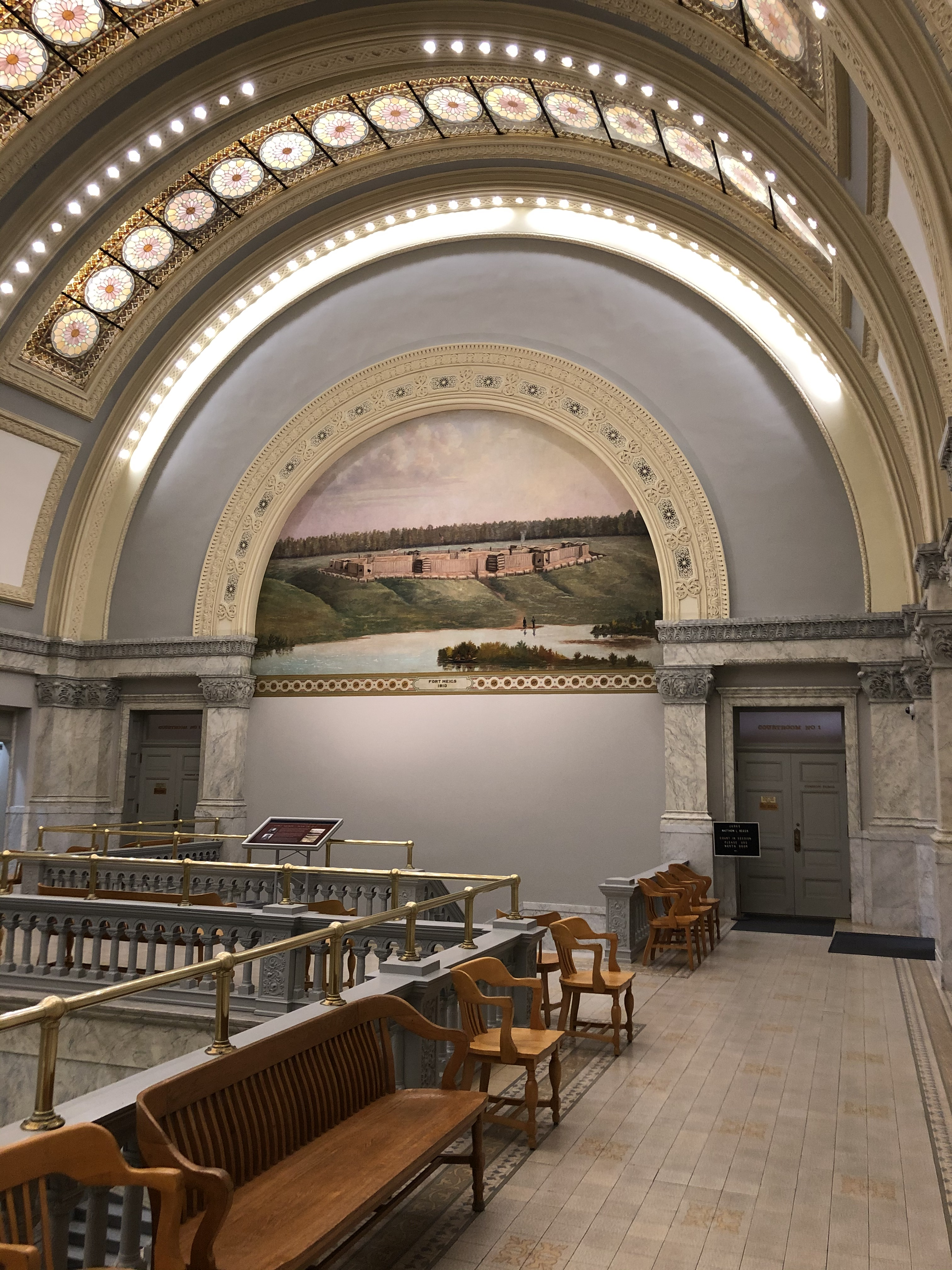
The Foyer

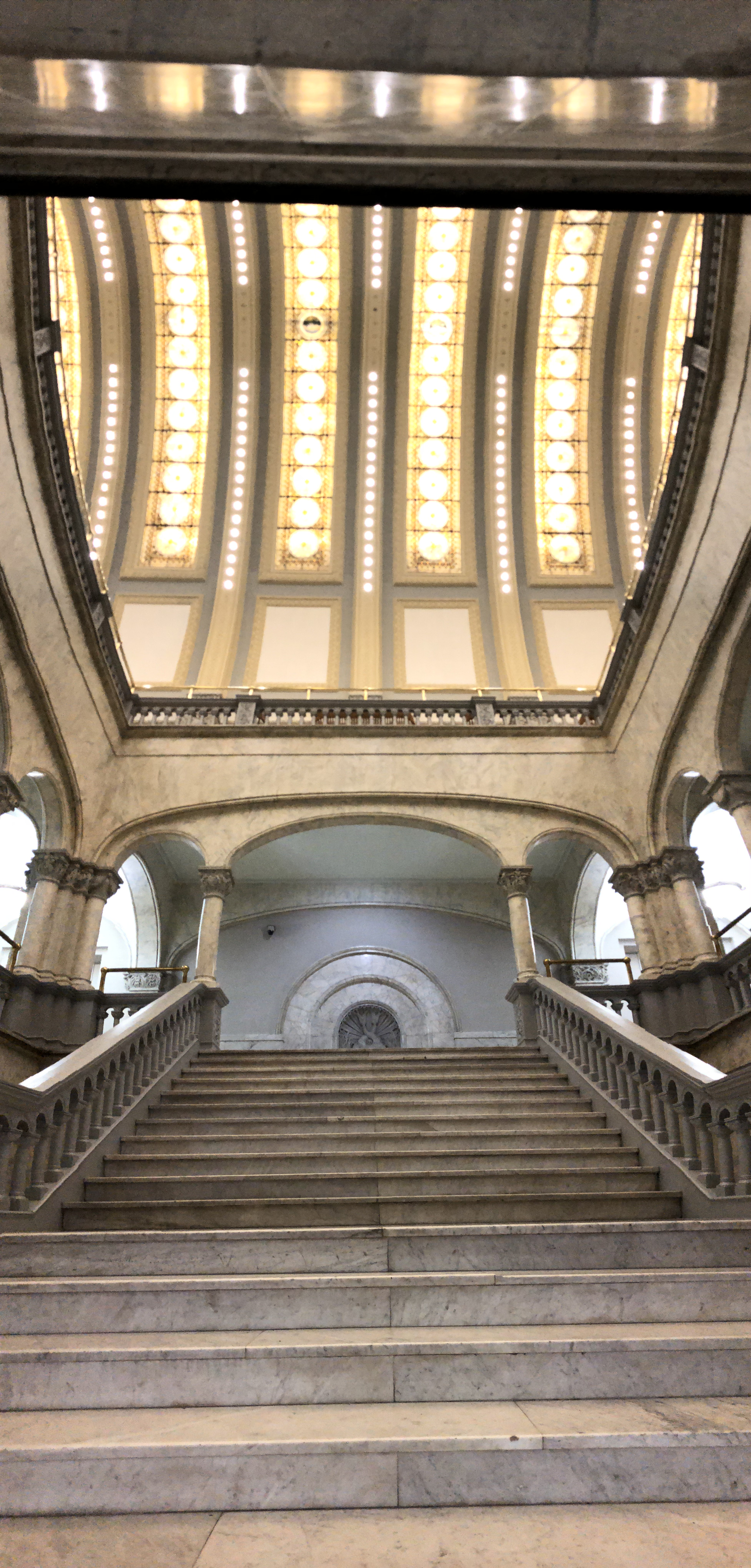
Vaulted ceiling.
