= Tuscarawas County Courthouse =

Local government building in the United States

- U.S. National Register of Historic Places
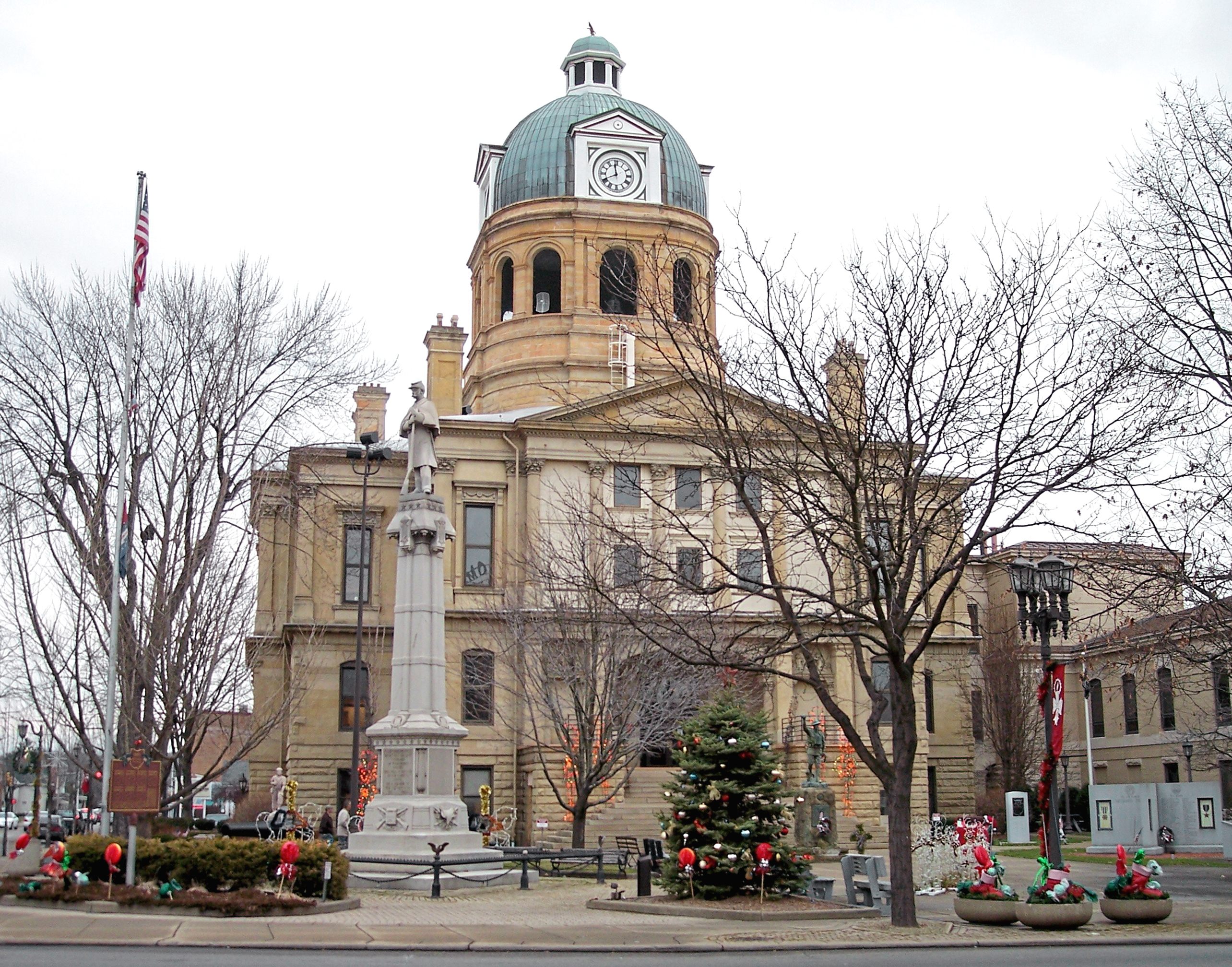
- The Tuscarawas County Courthouse in 2006

- Location within Ohio Location within the United States
- Location: Courthouse Sq., New Philadelphia, Ohio
- Coordinates: 40°29′24″N 81°26′42″W
- Area: 1.5 acres (0.61 ha)
- Built: 1882
- Architect: Thomas Boyd; T.B. Townsend
- Architectural style: Classical Revival
- NRHP reference No.: 73001544
- Added to NRHP: July 16, 1973

The Tuscarawas County Courthouse is located at 125 East High Avenue in New Philadelphia, Ohio. The courthouse was constructed by Thomas Boyd in 1882 in the Classical Revival style. An expansion was added in 1990 to alleviate the needs of a growing population and blends in with the older structure. The courthouse was placed on the National Register on July 16, 1973. The copper dome was fixed in 2018, restoring the copper color.
