= Thomas Shelton (musician) =

American musician

Thomas Shelton, the great nephew of B.F. Shelton is a southern gospel musician currently living in Zanesville, Ohio. Shelton was born on April 28, 1958, in Richmond, Indiana, to Winston and Nellie Shelton and was raised in a devout Christian home. He began performing as a Christian musician about 1977, when he was listed in "Who's Who in Musician America." In June 1977 Shelton became a member of the touring group General Delivery U.S.A. He later was the lead singer for the Gospelites group of Dobbins, California, and he was the tenor for the Watchmen. Shelton served two years with his wife in the Caribbean and South America. They were both cruise directors for New Creation World Wide Christian Cruises. Shelton also served as music director at three churches and as youth minister at two churches.

Shelton started Thomas Shelton Ministries and has performed as a soloist gospel singer since at least 1999. As a solo singer, he has toured in every U.S. state and eleven countries. He performs in about 150 concerts a year and has seven CDs for sale.

Thomas Shelton is married to Shannon Shelton and they have three sons, Zackery, Curtis and Hunter.
