= Johnny Gardner =

Johnny Gardner (c. 1882 – c. 1953) was a notorious gangster and professional bank robber commonly known as "Dressed-up Johnny", whom the police described as the "ace of the safe crackers".

== Early career ==
He was born on August 26, 1882, and was a native of Zanesville, Ohio. He had spent time in the Ohio State Prison at Columbus and the Illinois State Prison at Joliet. Johnny Gardner was described as a "notorious character" and a "gangster of the worst kind".

== Crime spree ==
Gardner and his gang began terrorizing southern Illinois from 1919 to 1922, robbing banks and post offices across the country. He was around the age of forty years and had acquired the nickname "Dressed-up Johnny", being a noted robber. Gardner and his gang robbed a bank in Georgia of $42,000 and in 1921, Gardner conducted a $100,000 bank robbery at Chicago, which led federal authorities on a nationwide manhunt. The New York Times had referred to Gardner as a "SAFE CRACKING ACE".

Gardner and his gang were arrested in 1922 after a gunfight with Franklin County Sheriff's deputies. It was stated that Gardner was suspected of over twenty-five bank and post office robberies across the country. However, Gardner was somehow released on technicalities.

== Syndicated bank robbery ==
His life between 1923 and 1937 is elusive. It is believed that Gardner was associated with such unsavory characters of the East St. Louis mob, such as Buster Wortman, Clyde Nimerick, Blackie Armes, and Jimmy Murray. Gardner was believed to have been the leader of a gang of 50 to 100 bank robbers that were based in Vandalia, Illinois, and conducted bank robberies across the country. Gardner's organized crime was once described as "Syndicated Bank Robbery" in a journal.

== Prison life ==
Gardner, at 56 years of age, was finally arrested in 1938 for a major Pennsylvania bank robbery. He was sent to Atlanta Federal Penitentiary but was transferred the next year in 1939 to Leavenworth Federal Penitentiary. However, the very next year in 1940 he was transferred to McNeil Island Federal Penitentiary where he remained until 1948 after serving ten years in three different prisons for bank robbery.

He was released in 1948 and his parole ended in 1953 when he was seventy-one years of age. It is unknown what happened afterwards. It is most likely that he died of natural causes, being one of the most mysterious and professional bank robbers in American history.
