= Architecture of Columbus, Ohio =

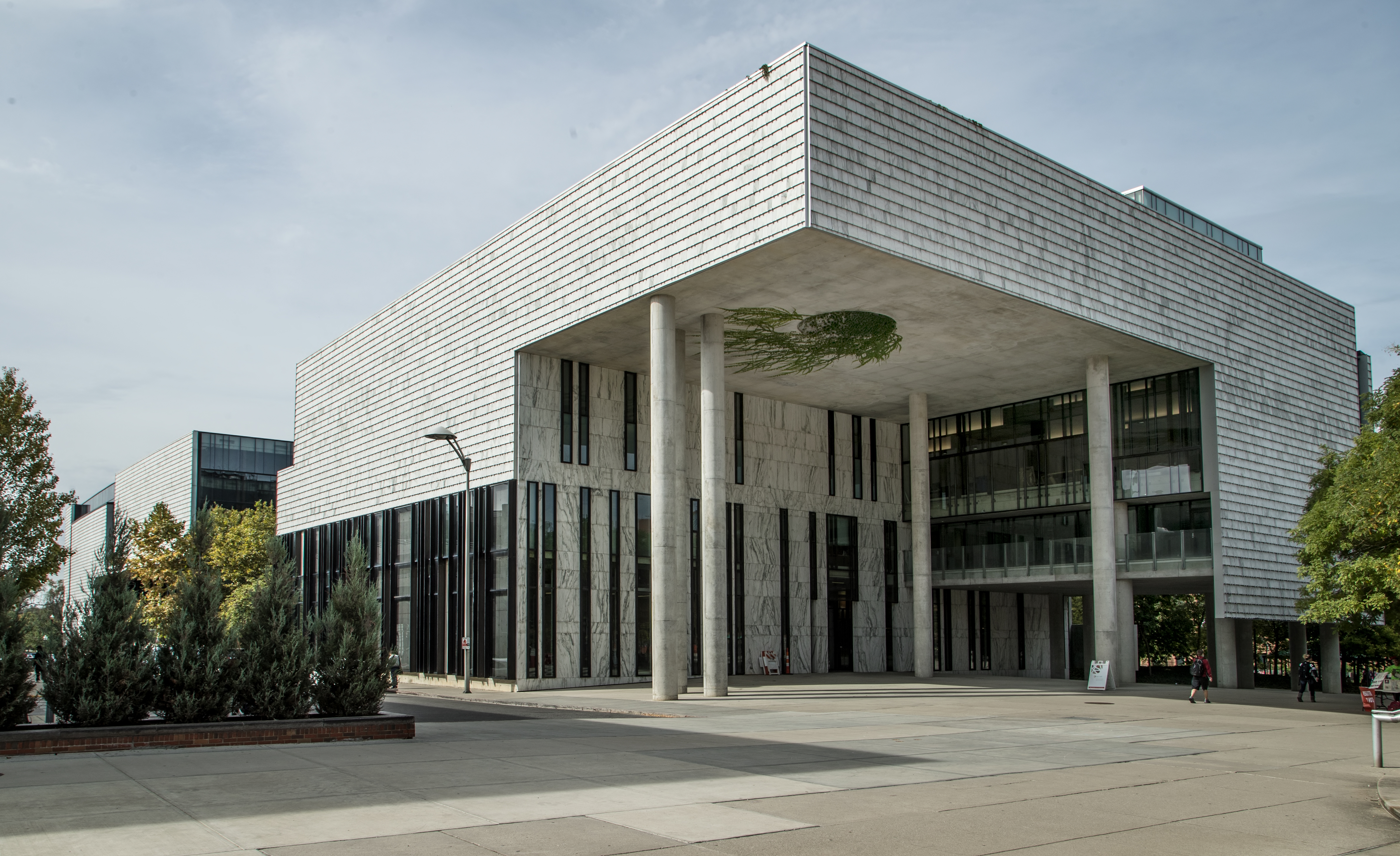
Knowlton Hall at the Ohio State University, by Mack Scogin Merrill Elam

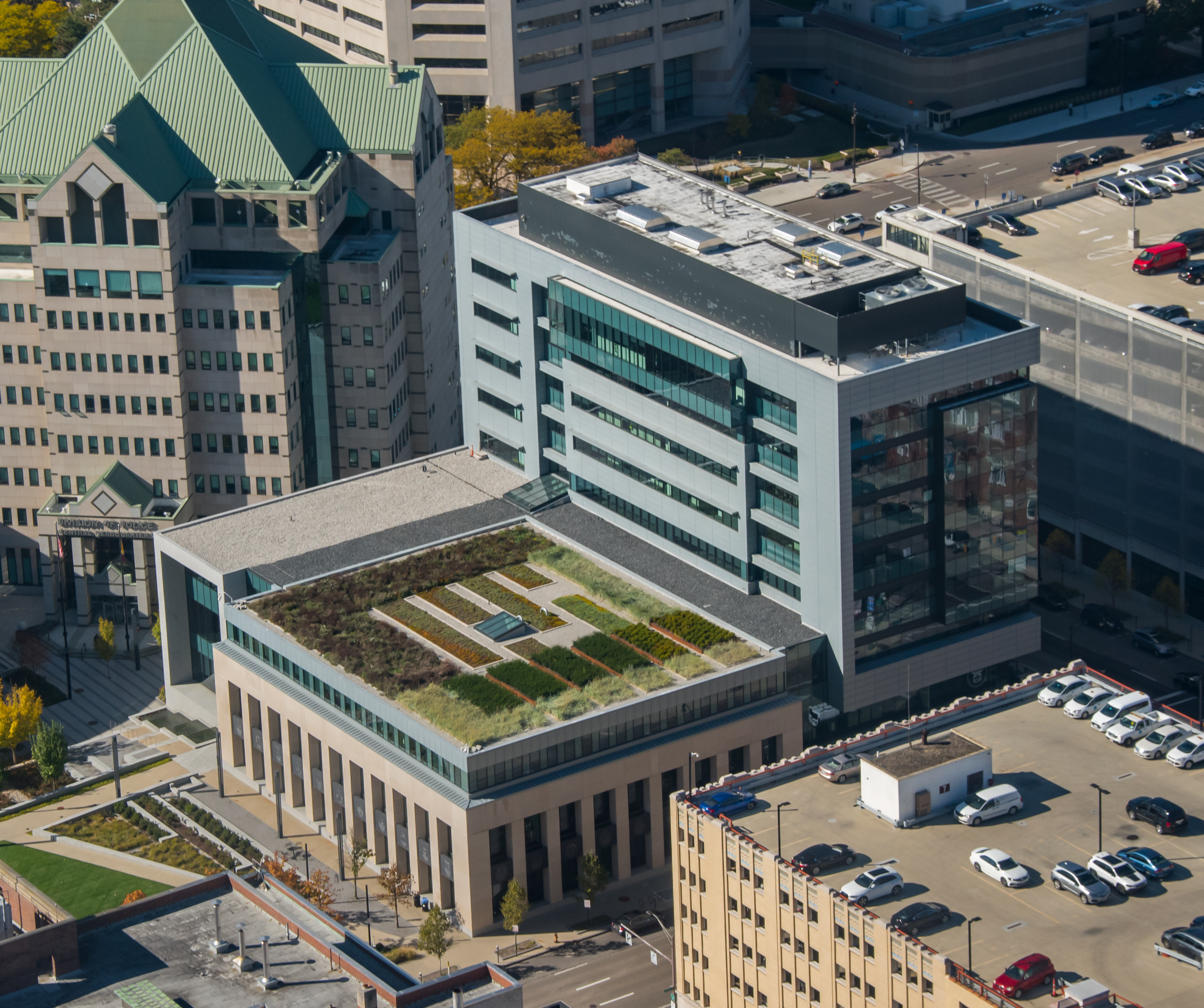
The Michael B. Coleman Government Center, by Schooley Caldwell and DesignGroup

The architecture of Columbus, Ohio is represented by numerous notable architects' works, individually notable buildings, and a wide range of styles. Yost & Packard, the most prolific architects for much of the city's history, gave the city much of its eclectic and playful designs at a time when architecture tended to be busy and vibrant.

== Planning ==
Columbus was laid out as a planned city, when the state legislature agreed to build a new city in the center of Ohio. As well, Franklinton landowners had donated two 10-acre (4.0 ha) plots in an effort to convince the state to move its capitol there. The two spaces were set to become Capitol Square (for the Ohio Statehouse) and the Ohio Penitentiary. The city was founded on February 14, 1812.

Columbus has experienced numerous short spans of population growth and building development. One early growth took place in the late 19th century, leading many buildings around the city to be constructed in the Richardsonian Romanesque style, popular during that time.

In 1908, the city published one of its most influential urban plans. The 1908 "City Beautiful" plan was an early plan to make more livable spaces, improve the city's economy, and establish several grand public buildings.

== Tallest buildings ==
The tallest high-rises and skyscrapers in Columbus are:

1. Rhodes State Office Tower
2. LeVeque Tower
3. William Green Building
4. Huntington Center
5. Vern Riffe State Office Tower
6. One Nationwide Plaza
7. Franklin County Courthouse
8. AEP Building
9. Borden Building
10. Three Nationwide Plaza

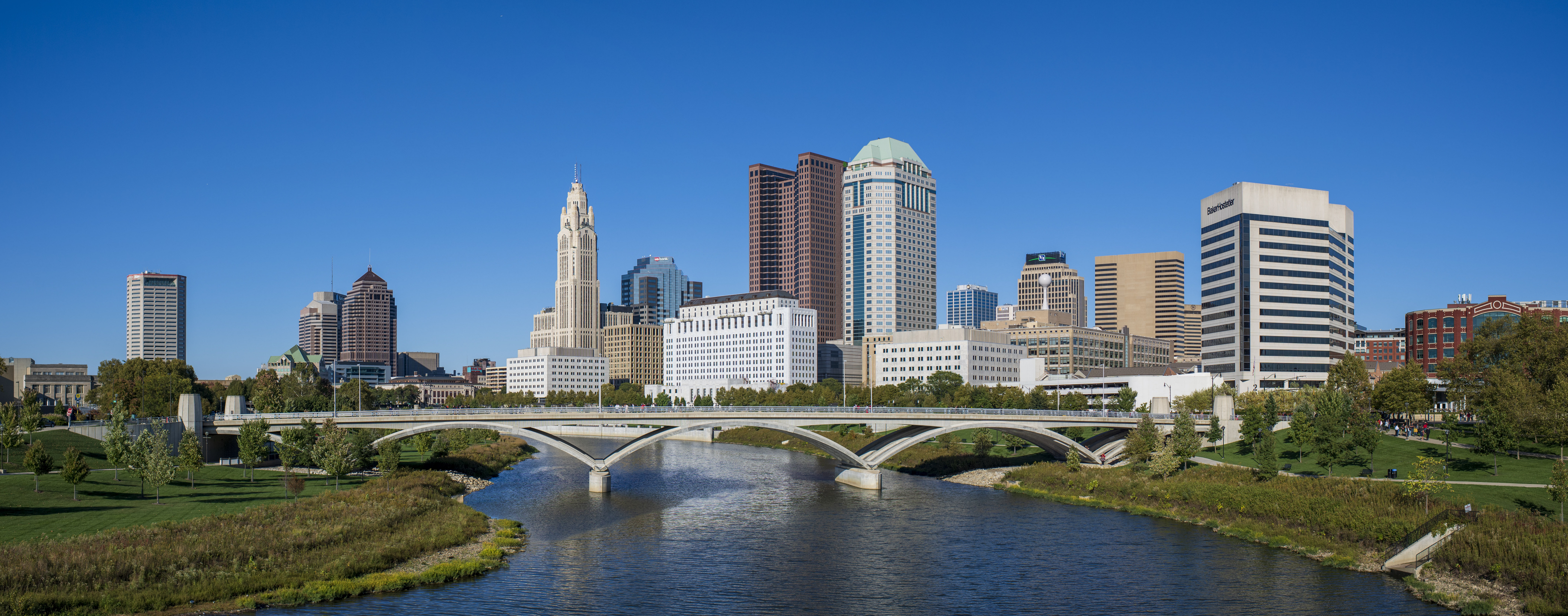
Panorama of Downtown Columbus

== Notable architects ==
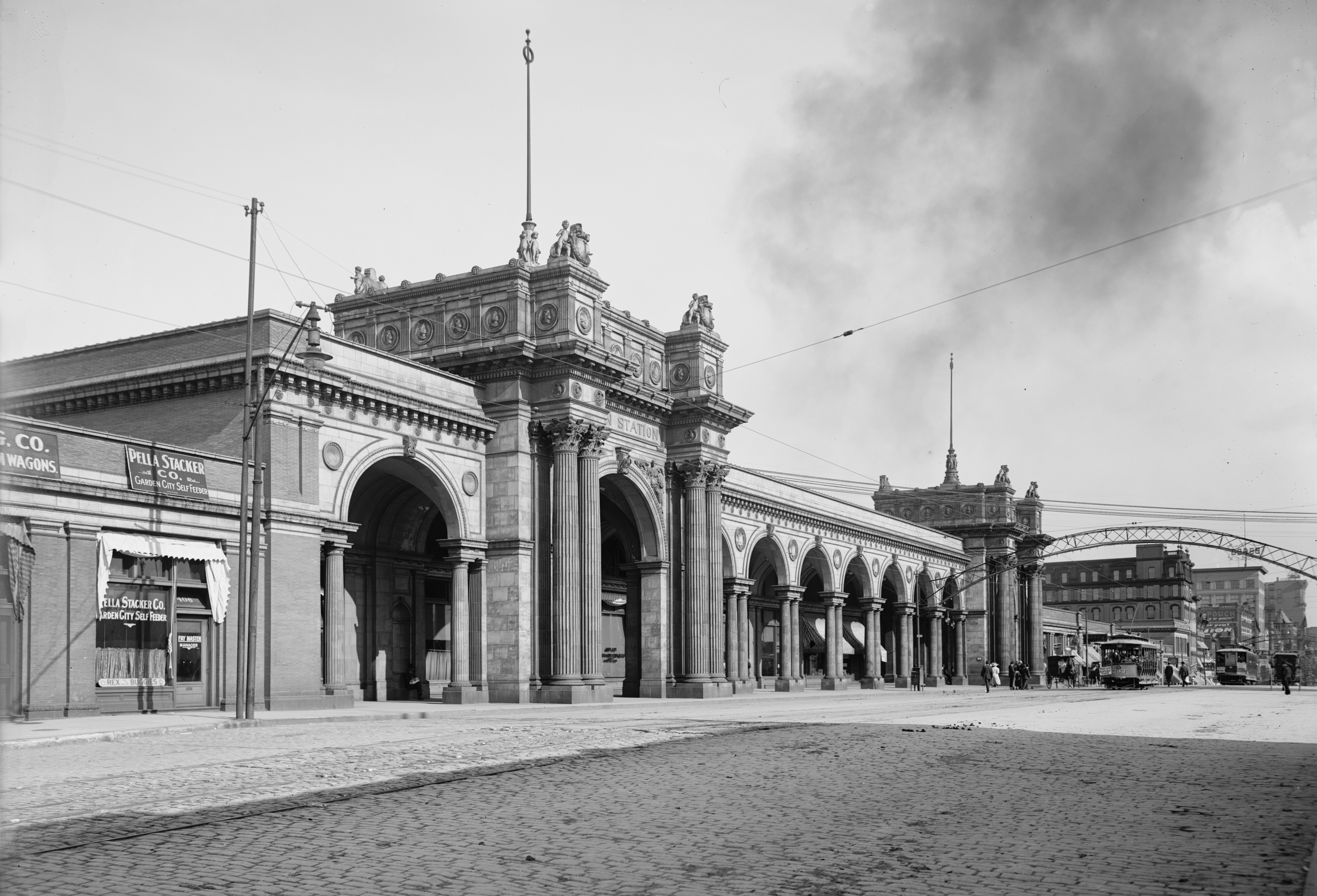
Arcade from Union Station, a Daniel Burnham work

=== Individual architects ===
- Nathan Kelley (1808–1871)
- George Bellows Sr. (1829–1913)
- Daniel Burnham (1846–1912)
- Joseph W. Yost (1847–1923)
- Elah Terrell (1851–1920)
- David Riebel (1855–1935)
- Herbert A. Linthwaite (1858–1929)
- Frank Packard (1866–1923)
- Harry Hake (1871 – 1955)
- Herbert Baumer (1885-1972)
- Howard Dwight Smith (1886–1958)
- Todd Tibbals (1910–1988)
- W. Byron Ireland (c. 1930-1982)
- Peter Eisenman (1932–)

=== Architecture firms ===
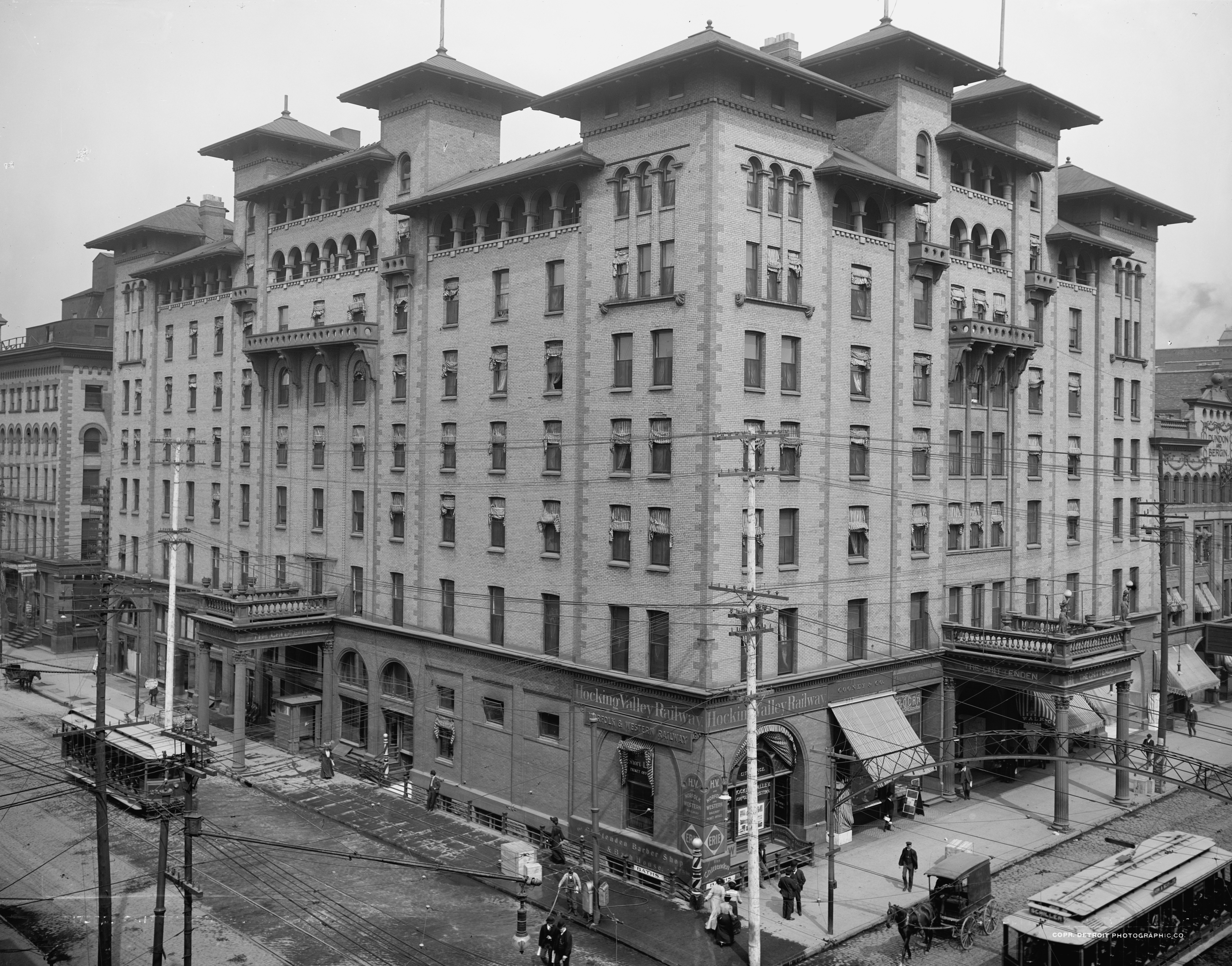
The Chittenden Hotel, a Yost & Packard work

- Allied Architects Association of Columbus
- Brubaker/Brandt
- DesignGroup
- DLR Group
- Harrison & Abramovitz
- Howell & Thomas
- MKSK
- Moody Nolan
- NBBJ
- Richards, McCarty & Bulford
- Schooley Caldwell
- Skidmore, Owings & Merrill
- Stribling & Lum
- Yost & Packard

== See also ==
- AIA Columbus
- Columbus Register of Historic Properties
- List of demolished buildings and structures in Columbus, Ohio
- National Register of Historic Places listings in Columbus, Ohio
