= Broad Street United Methodist Church (Columbus, Ohio) =

Historic church in Ohio, United States

- U.S. National Register of Historic Places
- Columbus Register of Historic Properties
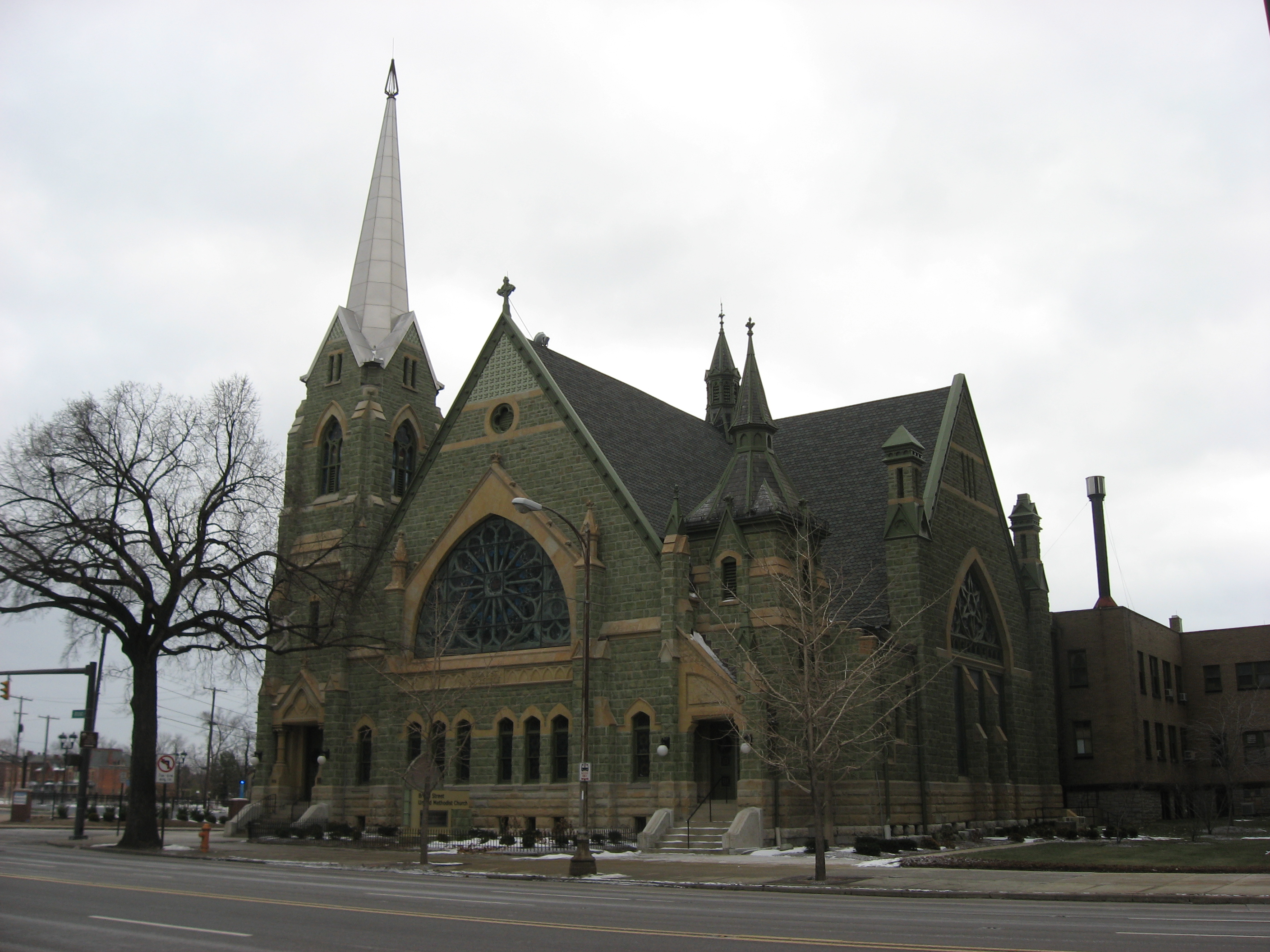
- Interactive map highlighting the church's location
- Location: 501 E. Broad St., Columbus, Ohio
- Coordinates: 39°57′48″N 82°59′15″W
- Area: less than one acre
- Built: 1885
- Architect: Yost & Packard
- Architectural style: Gothic Revival
- NRHP reference No.: 80002997
- CRHP No.: CR-37

Significant dates
- Added to NRHP: November 26, 1980
- Designated CRHP: June 18, 1985

Broad Street United Methodist Church is a historic Methodist church in Downtown Columbus, Ohio. This church is one of five on East Broad Street built around the year 1900.

It was built in 1885 and added to the National Register of Historic Places in 1980. The church was designed by Yost & Packard with green serpentine stone. This stone was replaced by Rogers Krajnak Architects with synthetic stone that preserved the original green color.

Broad Street United Methodist Church was the site of the 2016 wedding of openly gay pastor David Meredith and Jim Schlachter.

== See also ==
- National Register of Historic Places listings in Columbus, Ohio
