= George Bellows Sr. =

American architect, builder, and politician (1829–1913)

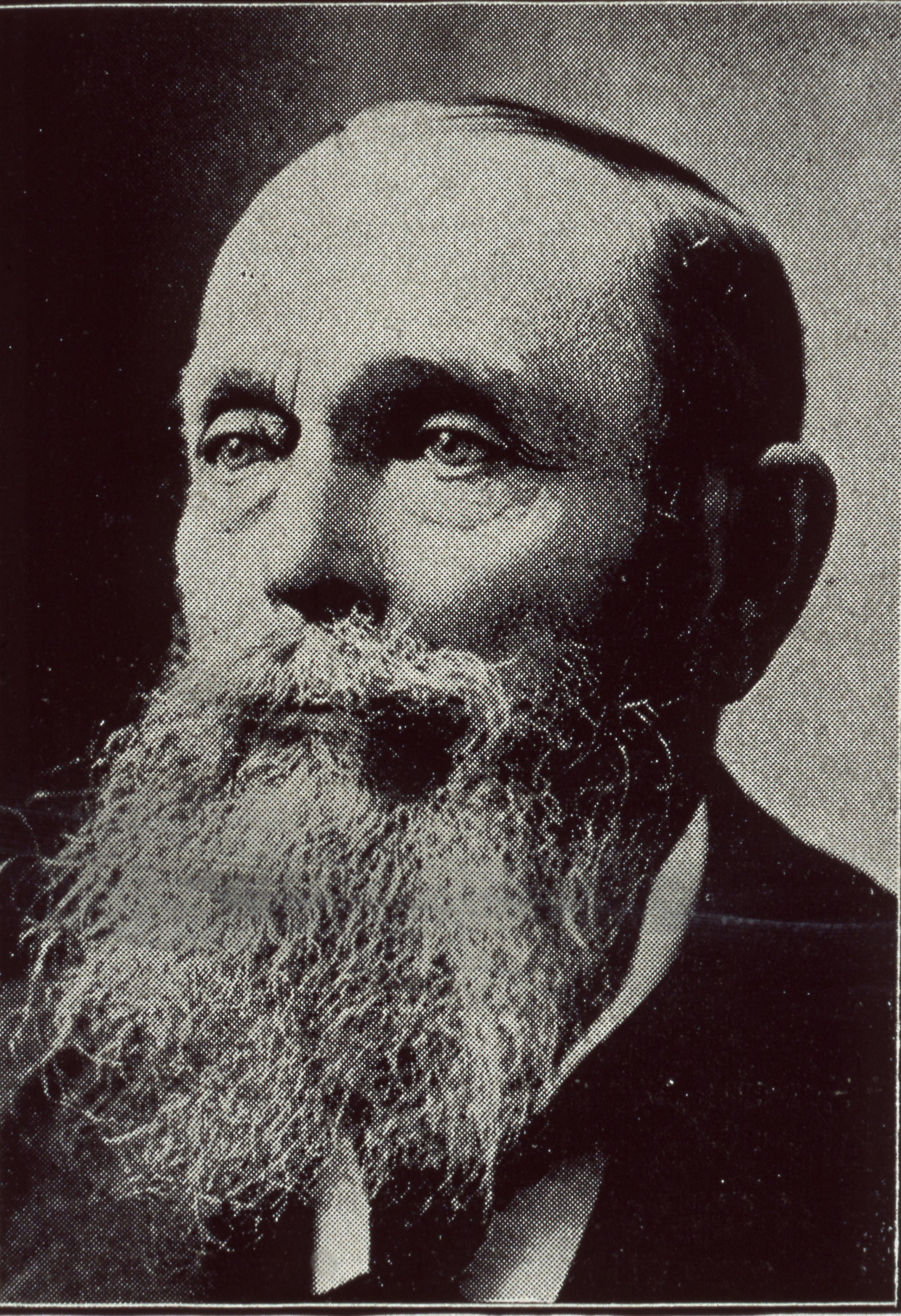
1896 portrait

George Bellows (January 2, 1829–March 23, 1913) was an American architect and builder, and a Franklin County Commissioner. A resident of Columbus, Ohio, he was the father of prolific painter George Bellows. He is buried in Green Lawn Cemetery.

Bellows was born on Long Island in New York in 1829. In 1849, he traveled toward California to join the California Gold Rush, though he stopped in Columbus en-route and never relocated. He became an architect and building contractor in Columbus.

== Works ==
Bellow's works included:

As architect

- Chittenden Hotel
- Ohio Institution for the Deaf and Dumb (main building)
- St. Francis Hospital (assistant)

As builder

- Bellows School
- First AME Zion Church, 873 Bryden Road
- Franklin County Courthouse (1887–1974)
- Franklin County Jail

As architect and builder

- Bellows family home, 144 S. Monroe Avenue (1903)

== See also ==
- Architecture of Columbus, Ohio
