= Columbus Athenaeum =

- Masonic Temple
- U.S. National Register of Historic Places
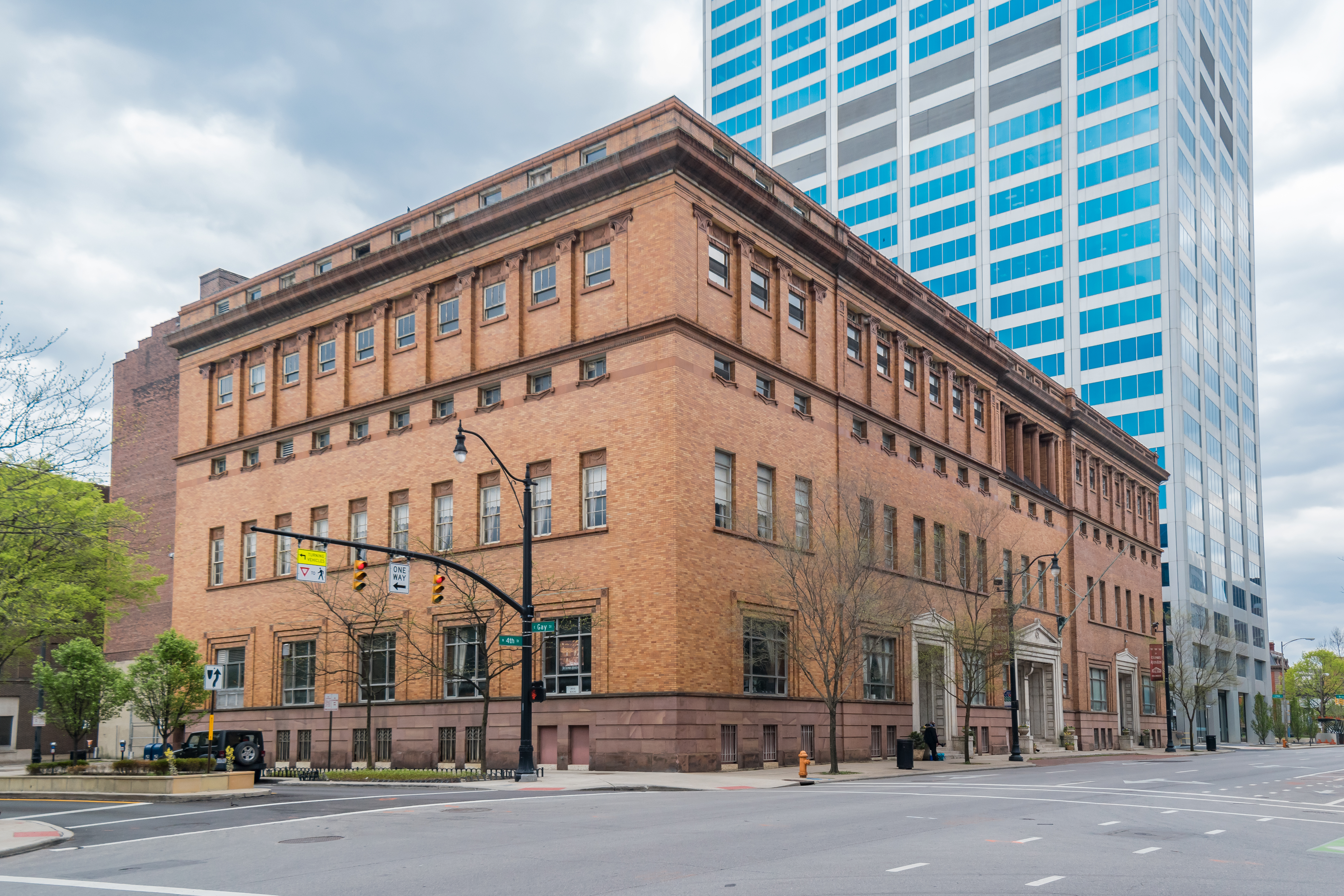
- Interactive map highlighting the building's location
- Location: 34 N. 4th Street, Columbus, Ohio
- Coordinates: 39°57′49″N 82°59′48″W
- Area: Less than one acre
- Built: 1899
- Architect: multiple
- Architectural style: Classical Revival
- NRHP reference No.: 97000201
- Added to NRHP: February 27, 1997

The Columbus Athenaeum, built as the Masonic Temple, is a historic building in Downtown Columbus, Ohio. It was constructed as a meeting hall for local area Masonic lodges in 1899, and was listed on the National Register of Historic Places in 1997.

The building was first designed in 1898 by Yost & Packard, Kremer & Hart and John M. Freese. It was substantially expanded in 1912-13 under the design of Stribling & Lum, and was renovated further in 1935. By the 1913 renovation, it was considered the largest building used solely for the Masonic order. At a later date it housed a commercial catering venue for weddings and other events.

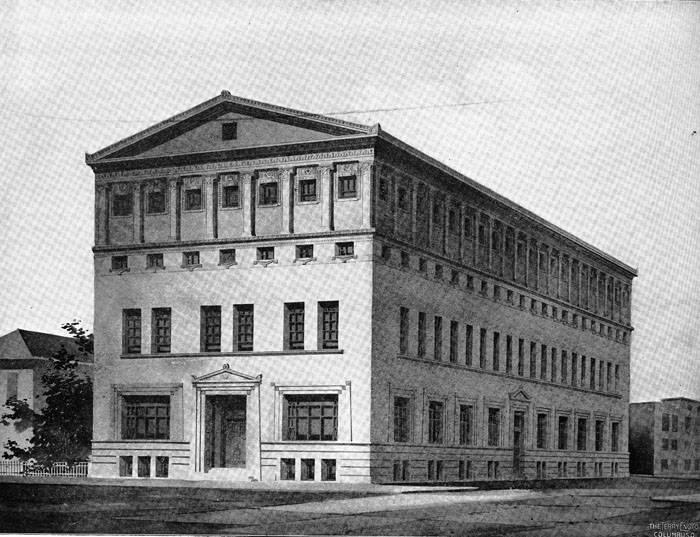
The building c. 1898, before expansion

== See also ==
- National Register of Historic Places listings in Columbus, Ohio
