= Westerville High School-Vine Street School =

- U.S. National Register of Historic Places
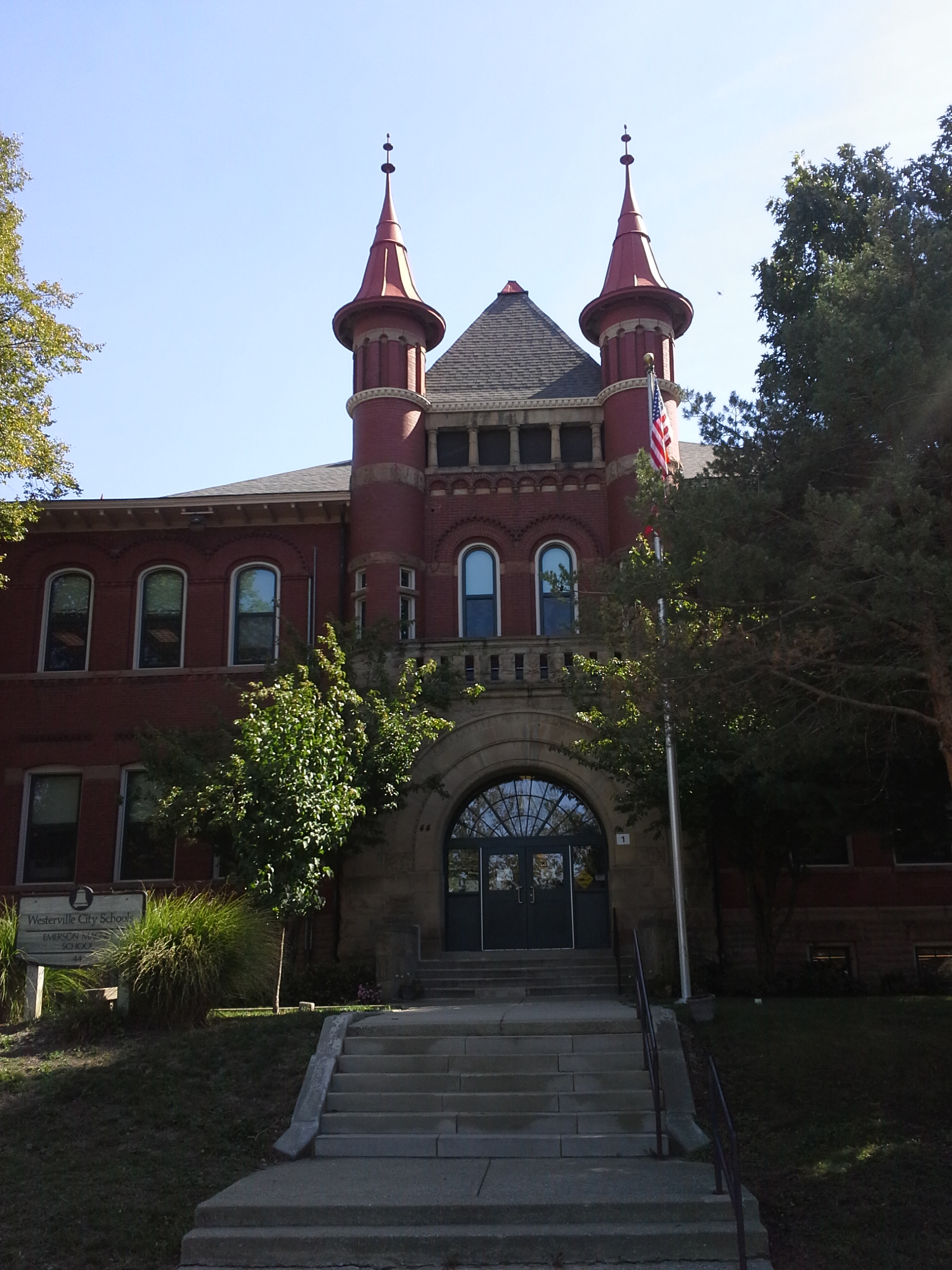
- Interactive map of Westerville High School-Vine Street School
- Location: 44 N. Vine St., Westerville, Ohio
- Coordinates: 40.127259°N 82.928762°W
- Built: 1896
- Architect: Yost & Packard
- Architectural style: Romanesque Revival
- MPS: 75001405
- NRHP reference No.: 75001405
- Added to NRHP: May 29, 1975

The Westerville High School-Vine Street School is a historic school in Westerville, Ohio. It was built in 1896 by the Columbus architecture firm of Yost and Packard. The high school is an example of Romanesque Revival architecture.

The building was opened to the public on during a grand ceremony on March 19, 1896. Today, the school is referred to as the Emerson Magnet school, which specializes in teaching children foreign languages and cultures.
