= Odd Fellows' Home for Orphans, Indigent and Aged =

- U.S. National Register of Historic Places
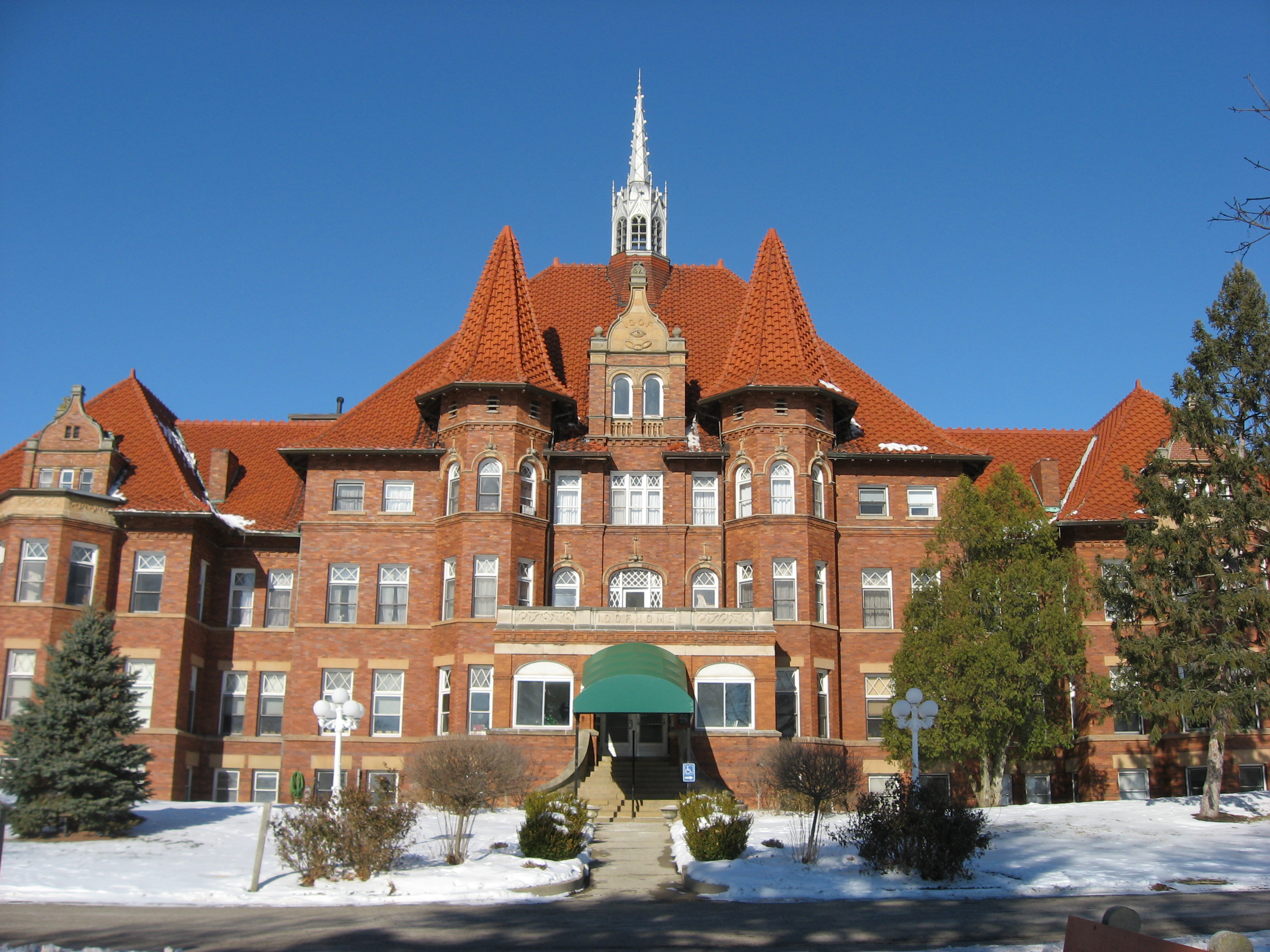
- Front of the main building
- Interactive map of Odd Fellows' Home for Orphans, Indigent and Aged
- Location: 404 E. McCreight Ave., Springfield, Ohio
- Coordinates: 39°56′23″N 83°47′59″W
- Area: 30 acres (12 ha)
- Built: 1898
- Built by: Evans, R.J., & Son
- Architect: Yost & Packard
- Architectural style: Renaissance, Chateauesque
- NRHP reference No.: 80002956
- Added to NRHP: April 16, 1980

Odd Fellows' Home for Orphans, Indigent and Aged, also known as I.O.O.F. Home for the Aged, in Springfield, Ohio, was built in 1898. Its architecture is Renaissance and Chateauesque. It was listed on the National Register of Historic Places in 1980.

It was designed by Joseph W. Yost and Frank Packard's firm of Yost & Packard. The building has two octagonal spires.
