= Loewenstein and Sons Hardware Building =

- U.S. National Register of Historic Places
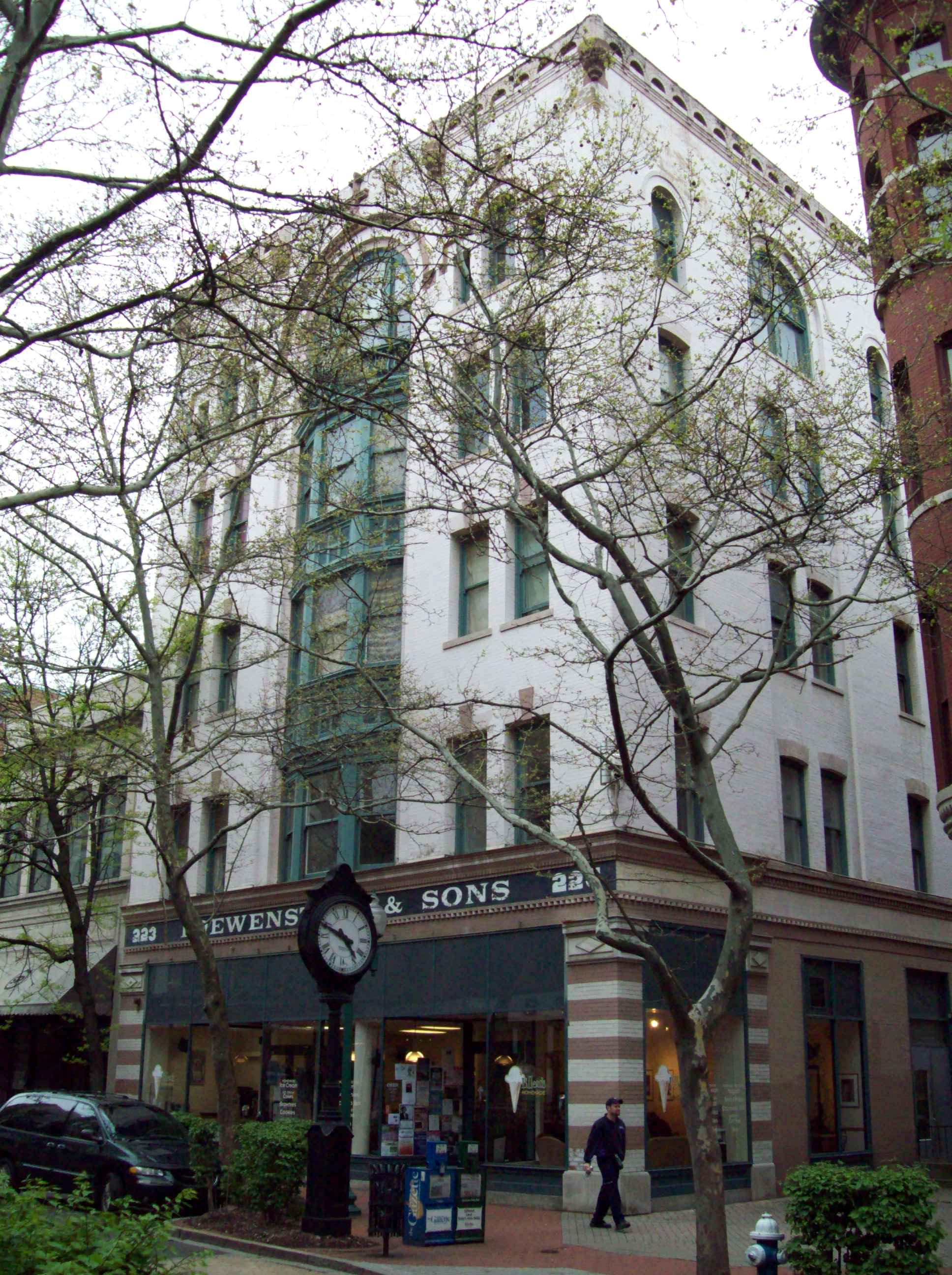
- Loewenstein and Sons Hardware Building, April 2009
- Interactive map of Loewenstein and Sons Hardware Building
- Location: 223--225 Capitol St., Charleston, West Virginia
- Coordinates: 38°21′2″N 81°38′5″W
- Area: 0.1 acres (0.040 ha)
- Built: 1900
- Architect: Yost & Packard
- Architectural style: Gothic
- NRHP reference No.: 85003475
- Added to NRHP: November 1, 1985

Loewenstein and Sons Hardware Building, also known as the Loewenstein Building or Rite Aid Building, is a historic commercial structure located at Charleston, West Virginia. It was designed by the Columbus, Ohio architectural firm of Yost & Packard.

The building is 35,000 square feet (3,300 m^{2}) in a five-story pressed brick structure that features eclectic late Victorian and classical details. The 48-foot (15 m) by 120-foot (37 m) building is distinguished by a central bay of oriel windows on its Capitol Street facade. Palladian windows are located on both sides of this central bay on the fifth floor. S.S. Kresge operated a variety store in the building from 1927 to 1971.

It was listed on the National Register of Historic Places in 1985.
