= Columbus Public School Library =

Library building in Columbus, Ohio, United States

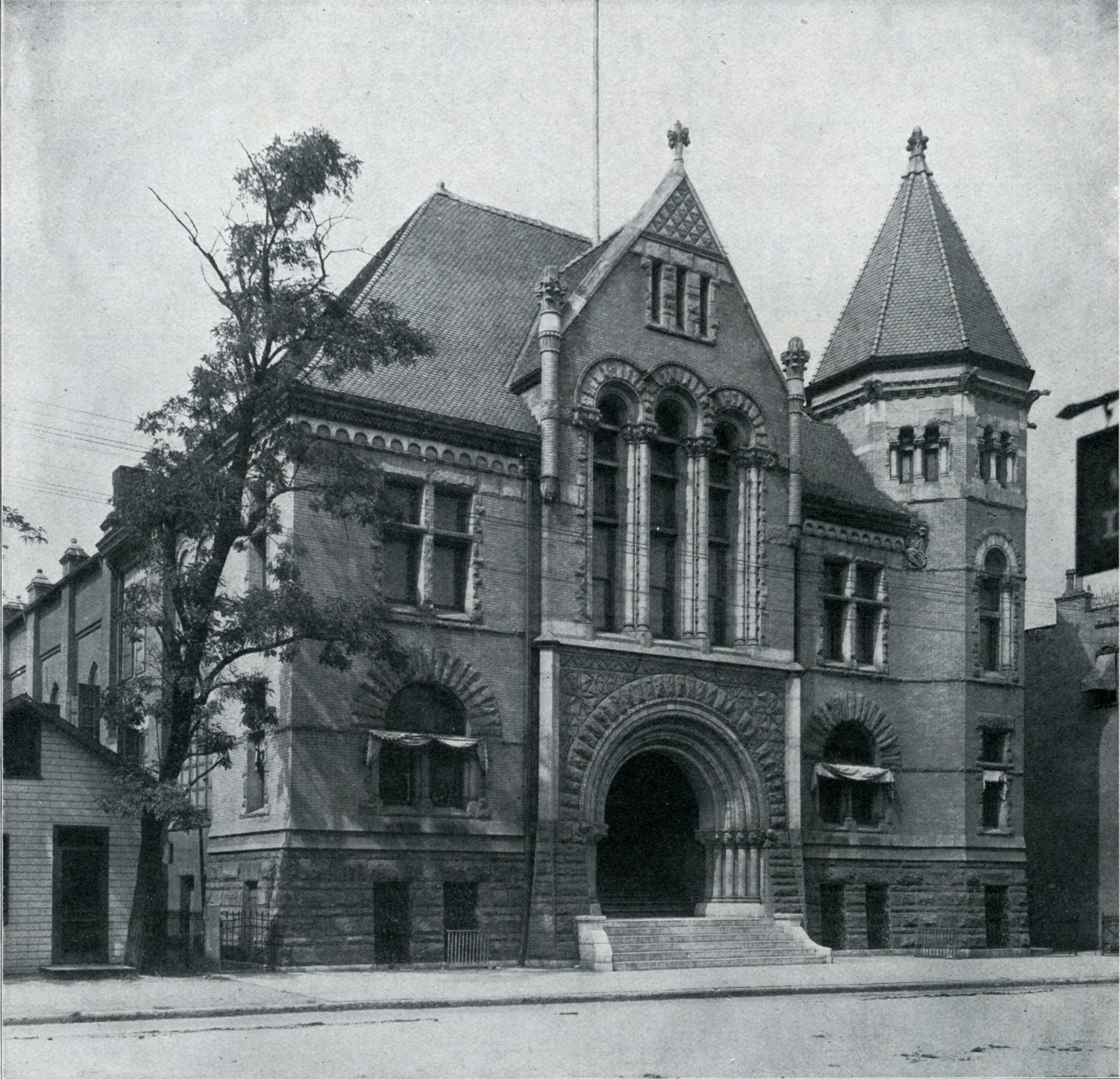
- Interactive map of the Columbus Public School Library area

General information
- Location: 40 E. Town Street
- Coordinates: 39.9592°N 82.9987°W
- Completed: 1853
- Renovated: 1891; opened April 7, 1892
- Closed: 1912, after September 1 collapse
- Demolished: 1913

Technical details
- Floor count: 2 and semi-basement

Renovating team
- Architects: Yost, Packard, and Fay

The Columbus Public School Library was a two-story building in Downtown Columbus, Ohio. It operated as the school library and administrative offices for the Columbus Public School District from 1892 to 1912. The library was established in the former First Methodist Episcopal Church, built in 1853 and extensively renovated for the district's use. The library opened in April 1892 and its ceiling collapsed in September 1912, leading to the building's demolition in 1913.

== Attributes ==
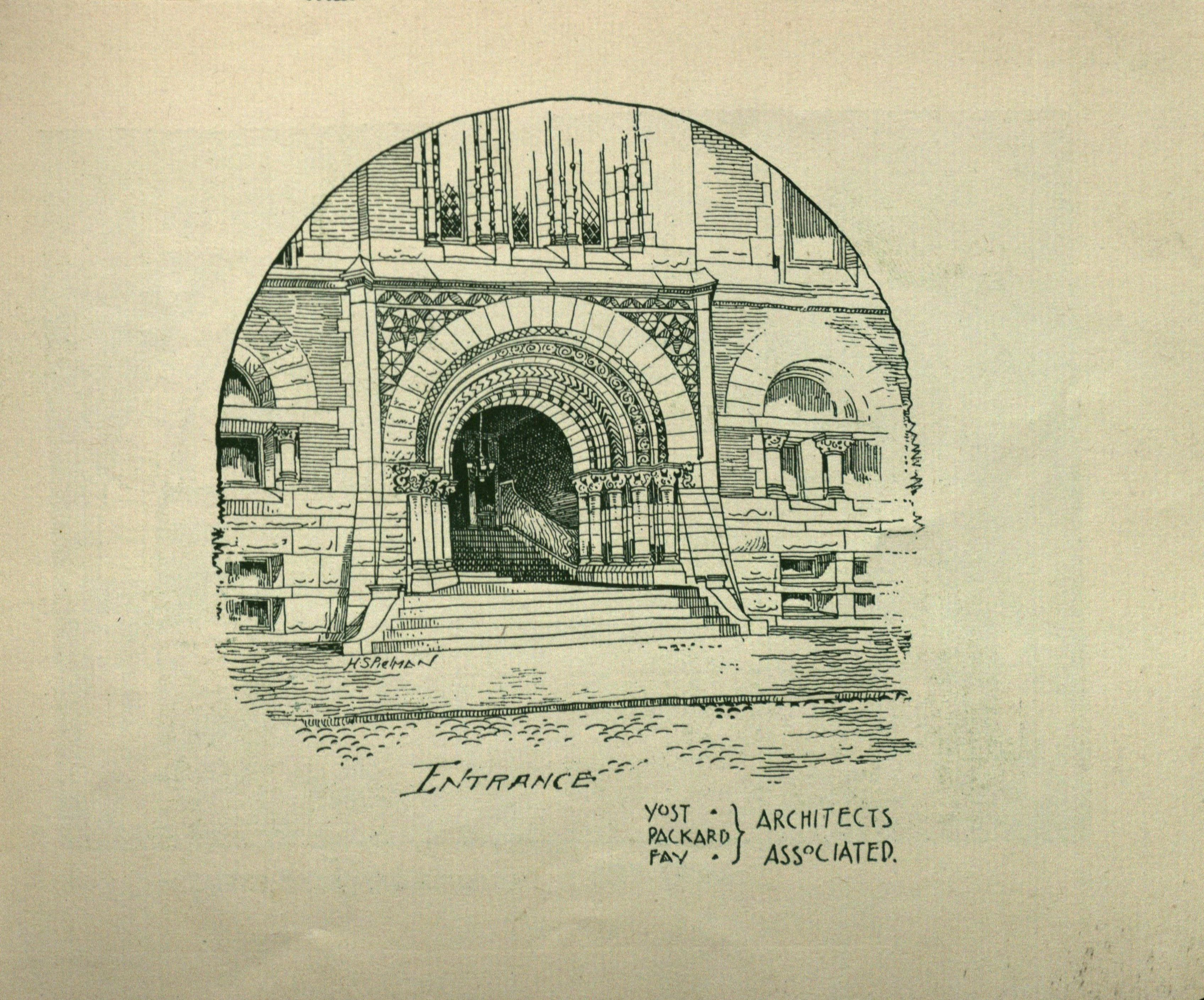
Entrance arch

The school library was located on a lot 95 by 187 feet (29 m × 57 m) on the north side of Town Street in Downtown Columbus, Ohio, between Pearl Alley and Third Street. The building was reported in 1892 to be centrally located, accessible from every streetcar line, and architecturally handsome. The library was originally designed to house 40,000 volumes.

The building's front was made of buff Amherst stone and buff pressed brick. It featured a mosaic of blue freestone and Lake Superior portage stone around its main entrance arch and front gable.

The building interior included two stories and a basement. The basement held a 400-seat teachers' assembly hall, the office of the Superintendent of Buildings, storage rooms, and an unpacking room for the library. The front of the first floor held a telephone room, and lavatory in addition to well-furnished offices – for the Clerk of the Board (including a fireproof vault), for the librarian, for the Superintendent of Instruction (a public office and a private office), and for the Truant Officer. It also held the library's reference room, holding numerous 28-inch-deep rolling bookcases, along with tables and chairs at the center. The front half of the second floor held board rooms – committee room, a lavatory, visitors' lobby, principals' assembly room, offices for the superintendents of music, drawing, and penmanship, and the Board Hall, where the Board of Education met regularly.

The rear half of the building held the two-story Library Hall, an ornate room measuring 52 by 59 5/6 feet (15.8 m × 18.2 m). The hall was intricately decorated, with globe lights brightly lighting the room and shimmering against the blue tints and gold in the ceiling and walls. The space, originally the church's sanctuary, had a drop ceiling supported by steel beams. The ceiling was described as a "work of art" with rich paneling. The southern end of the room, facing the lobby and arched entranceway, held a 26-foot-long issuing counter. The counter was screened at each end with copper grill panels, connected beneath a metal arch studded with electric globe lights. Originally, the hall ceiling was arched high against the roof, altered during the remodel into the library. Much of the floor was used for bookcases – fifteen double cases finished in antique oak, each able to hold 2,000 volumes. Eight were at the left, seven at the right, with a 20-foot-wide hall between them, holding distributing tables along with cabinets holding the card catalogue. At the back of the room was the cataloguing room, with shelving for 1,500 volumes.

The library was free for public use, supported through local taxes. It operated circulating and reference collections. The library was among the first in the nation to establish a relationship between libraries and schools by sending its books out to school buildings. It had some restrictions: when it opened, children under 12 had no library privileges. Around 1906, no girls under 16 could read novels on school district properties, nor withdraw any books of romance or sentiment.

Interiors

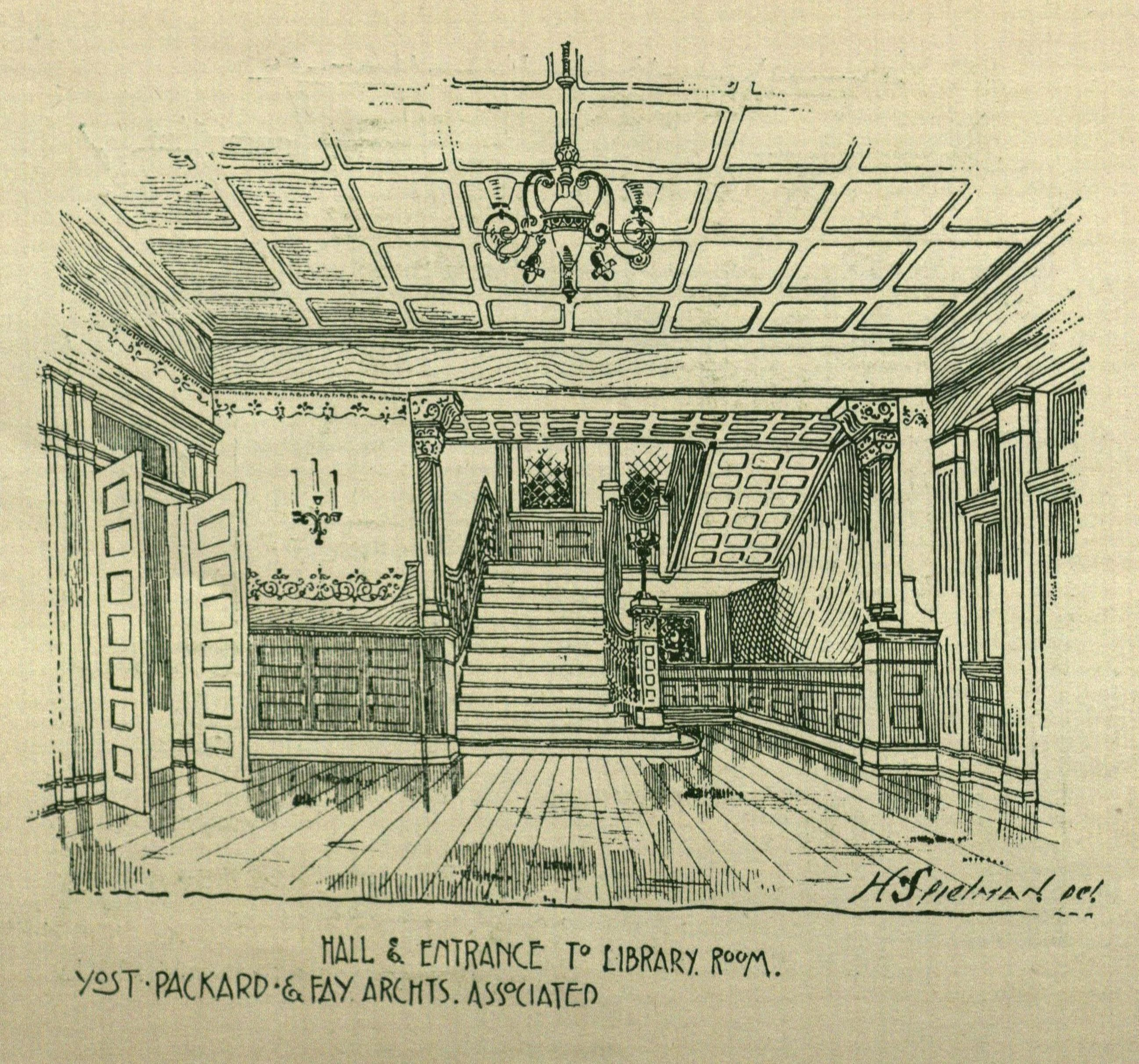
Entrance hall

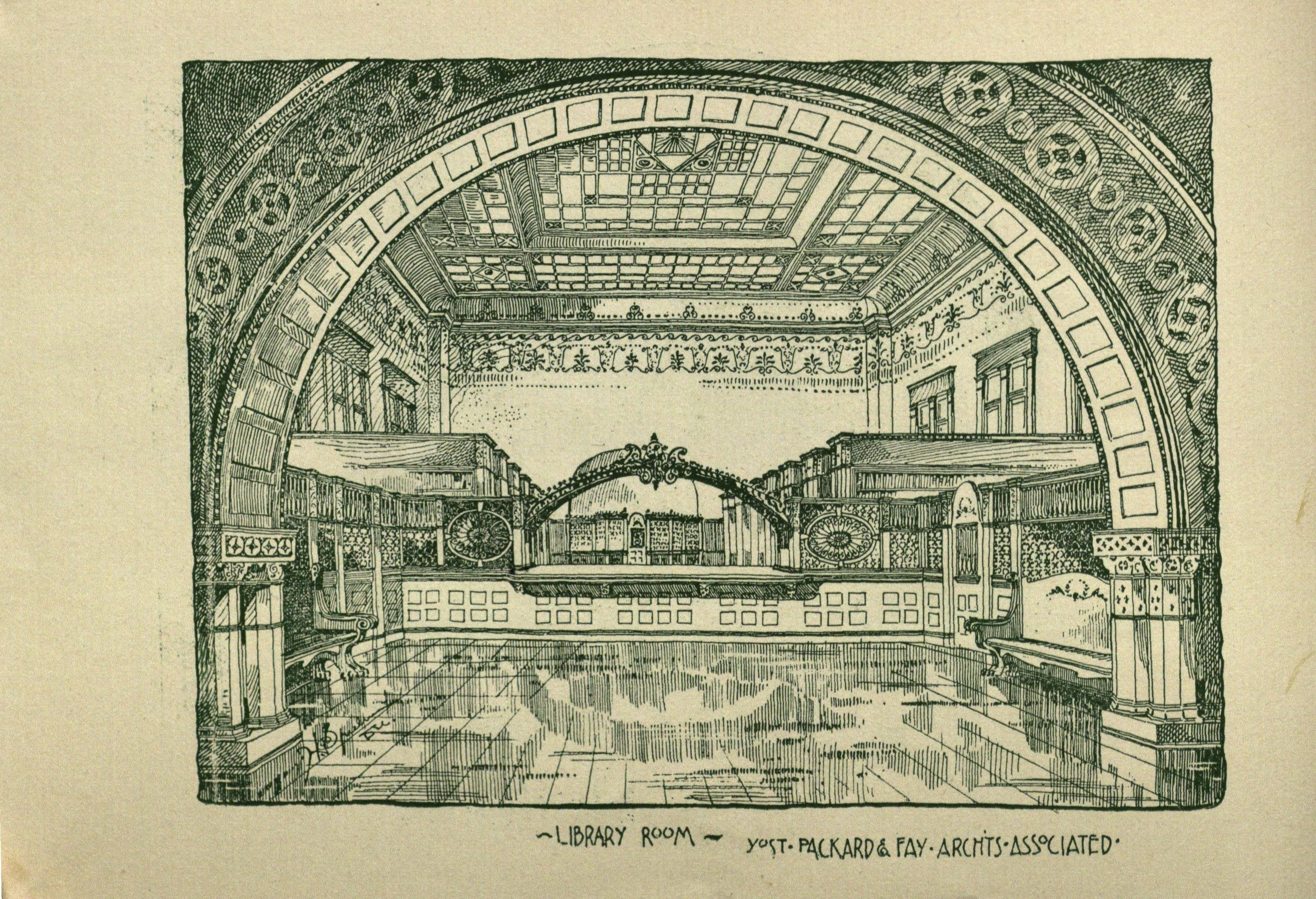
Library hall

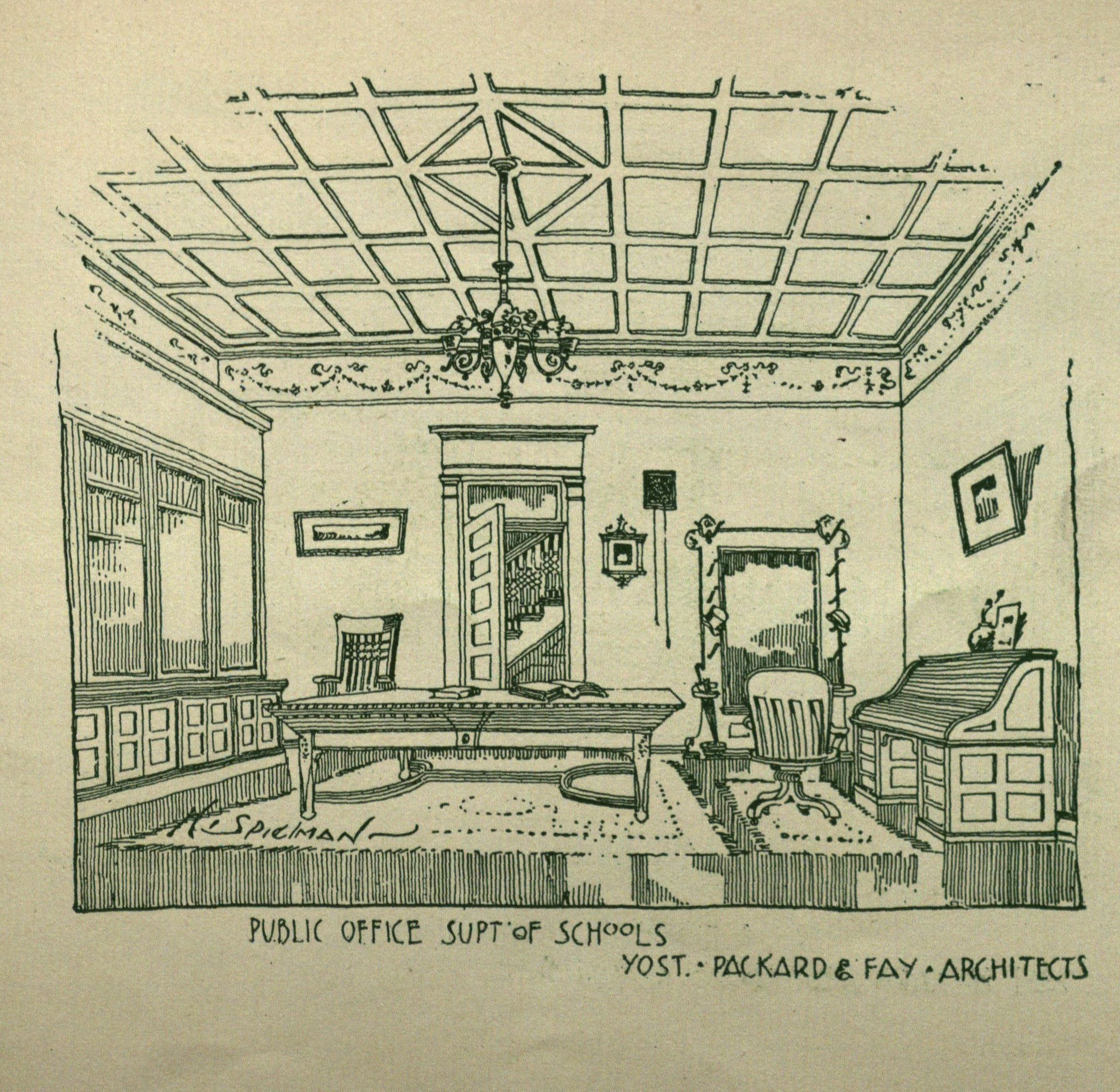
Public office, superintendent of schools

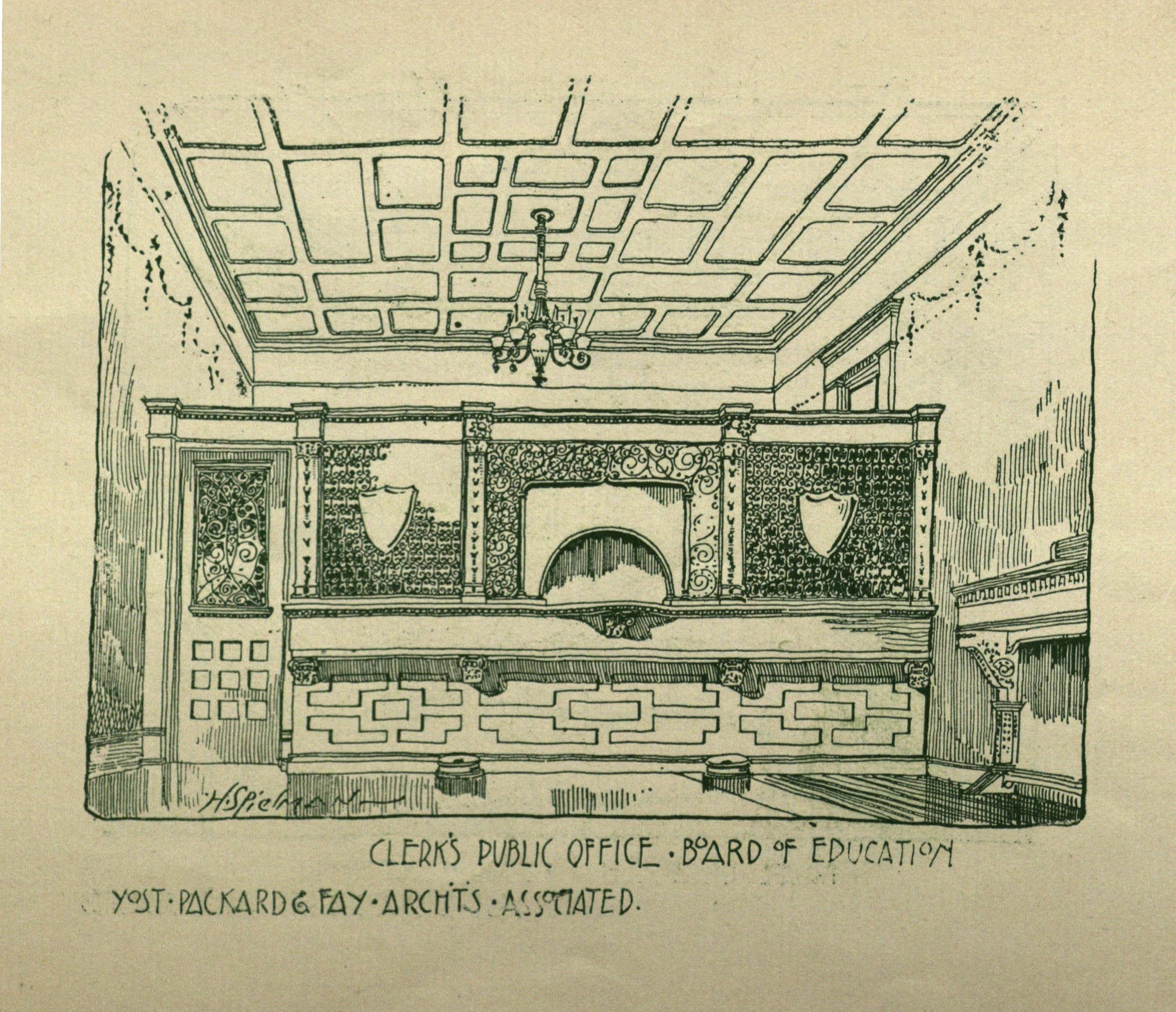
Public office, clerk of board of education

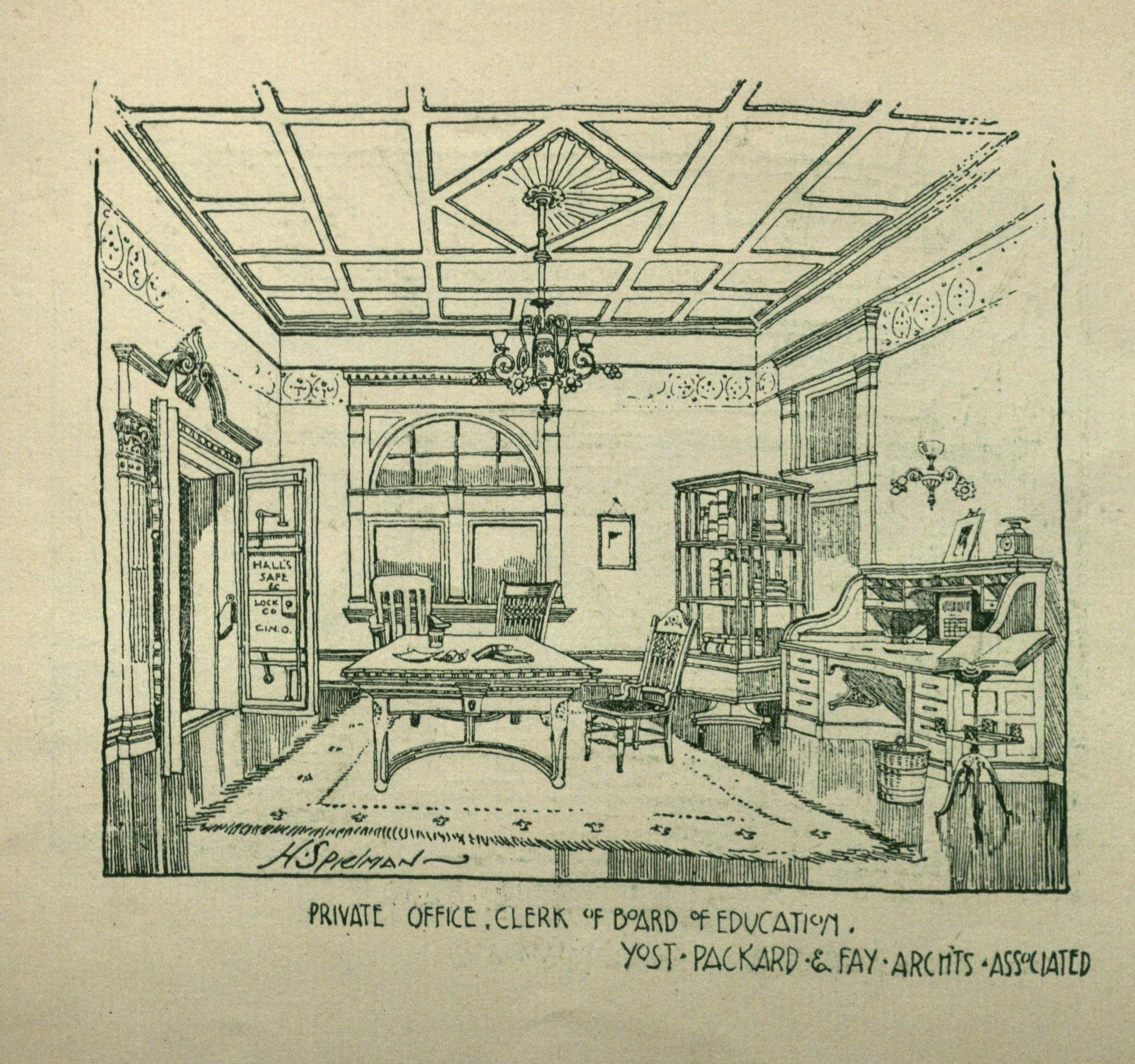
Private office, clerk of board of education

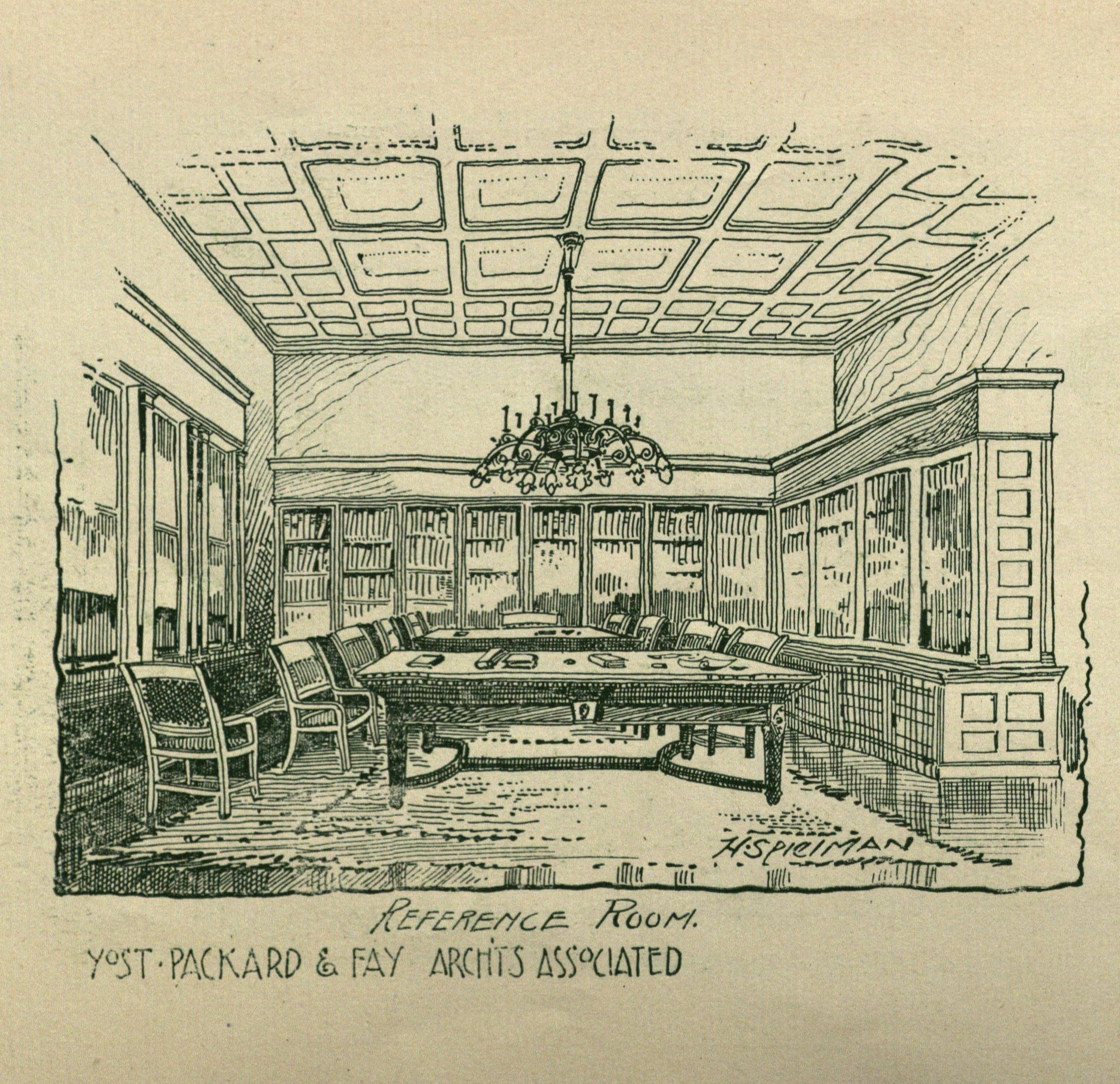
Reference room

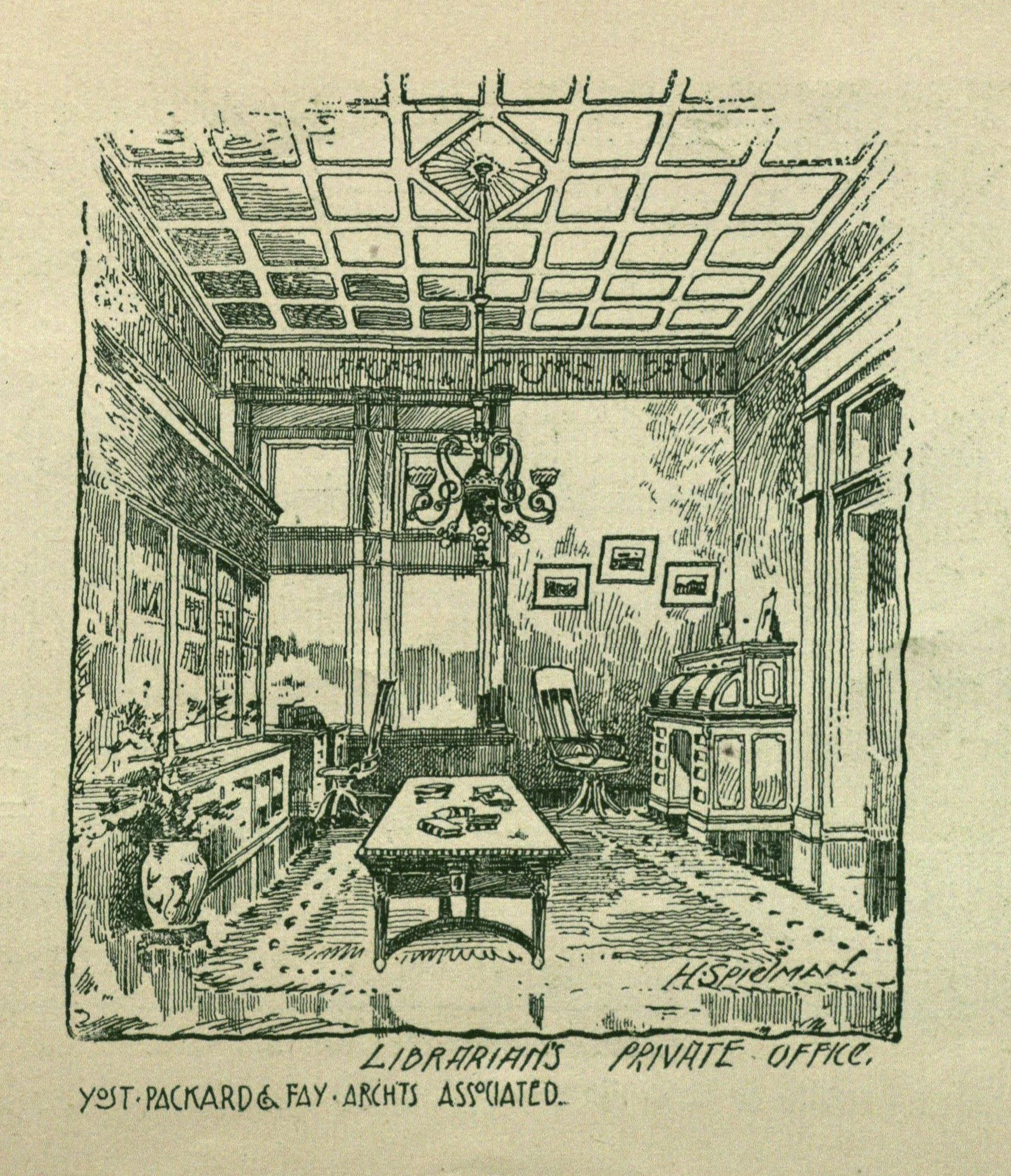
Librarian's private office

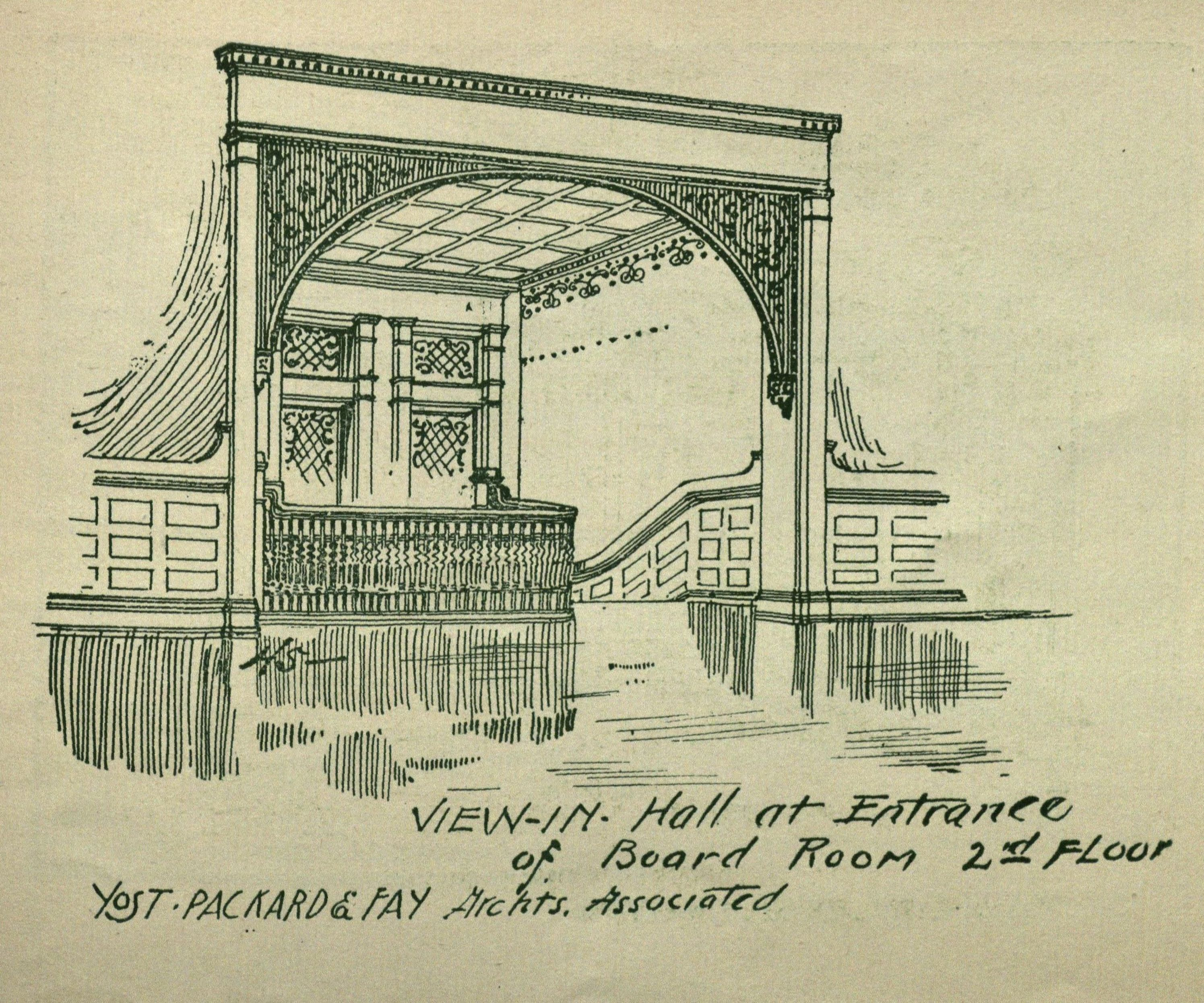
Hallway outside the board room

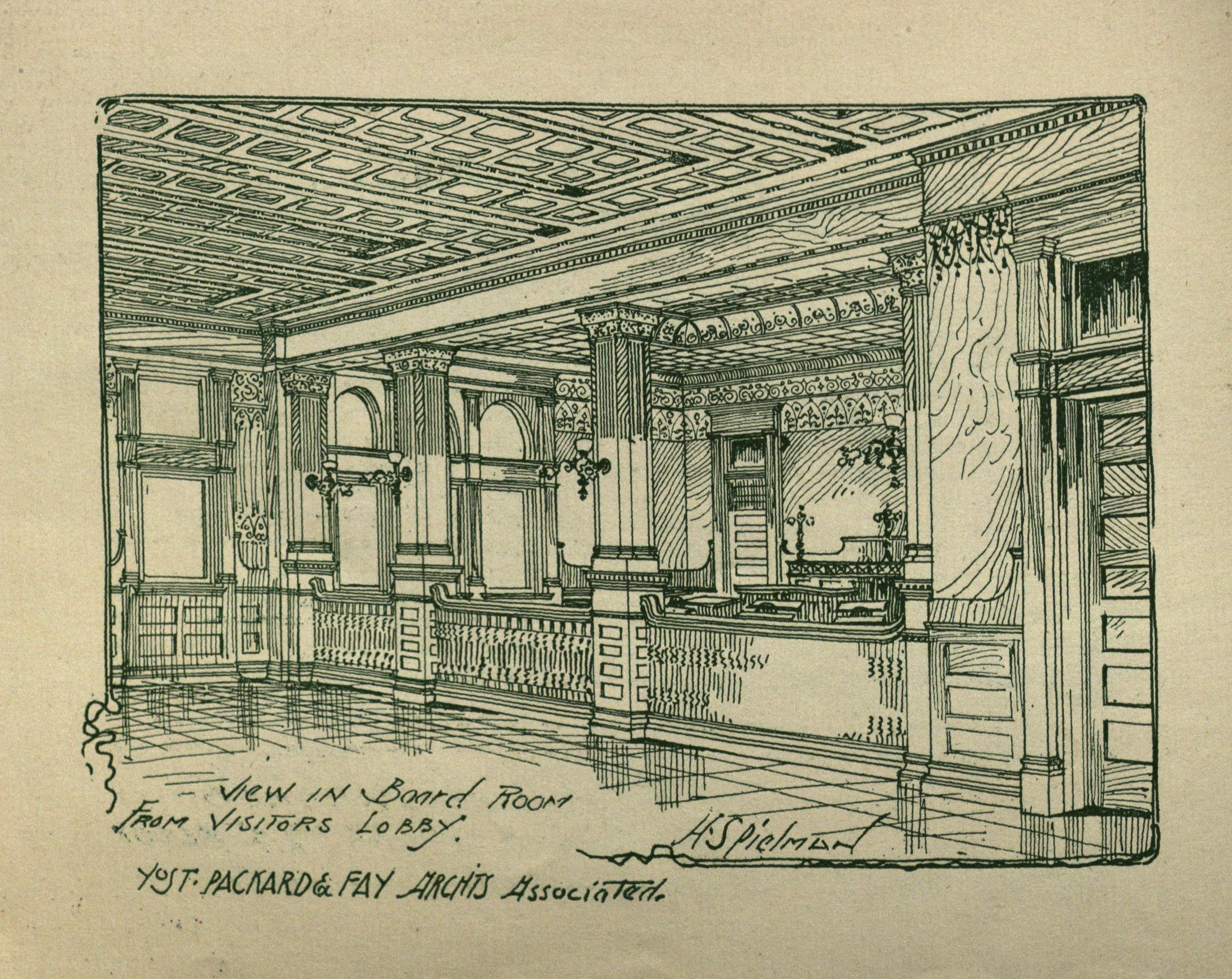
View into board room from visitors' lobby

== History ==
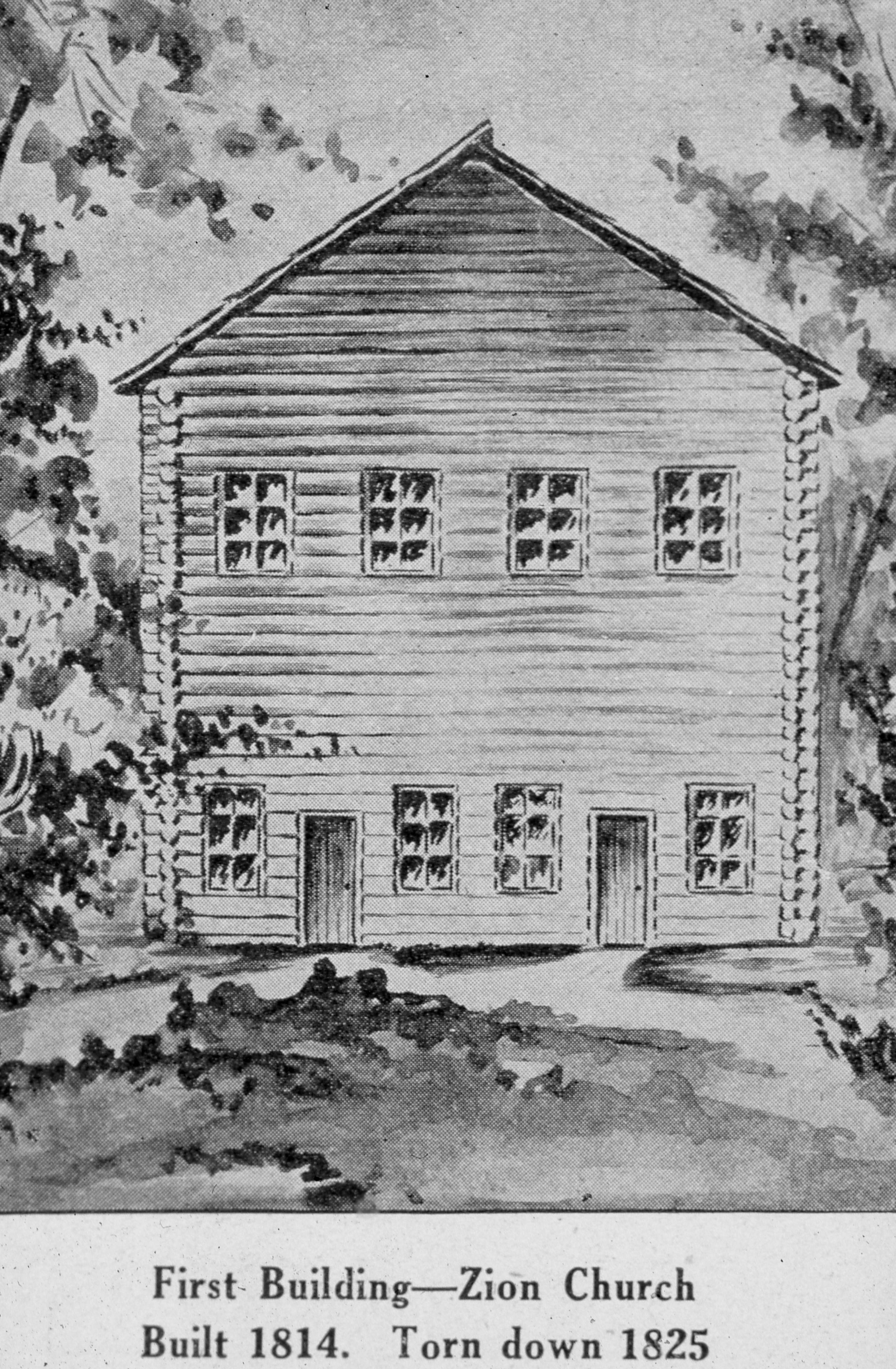
1814-1825 structure

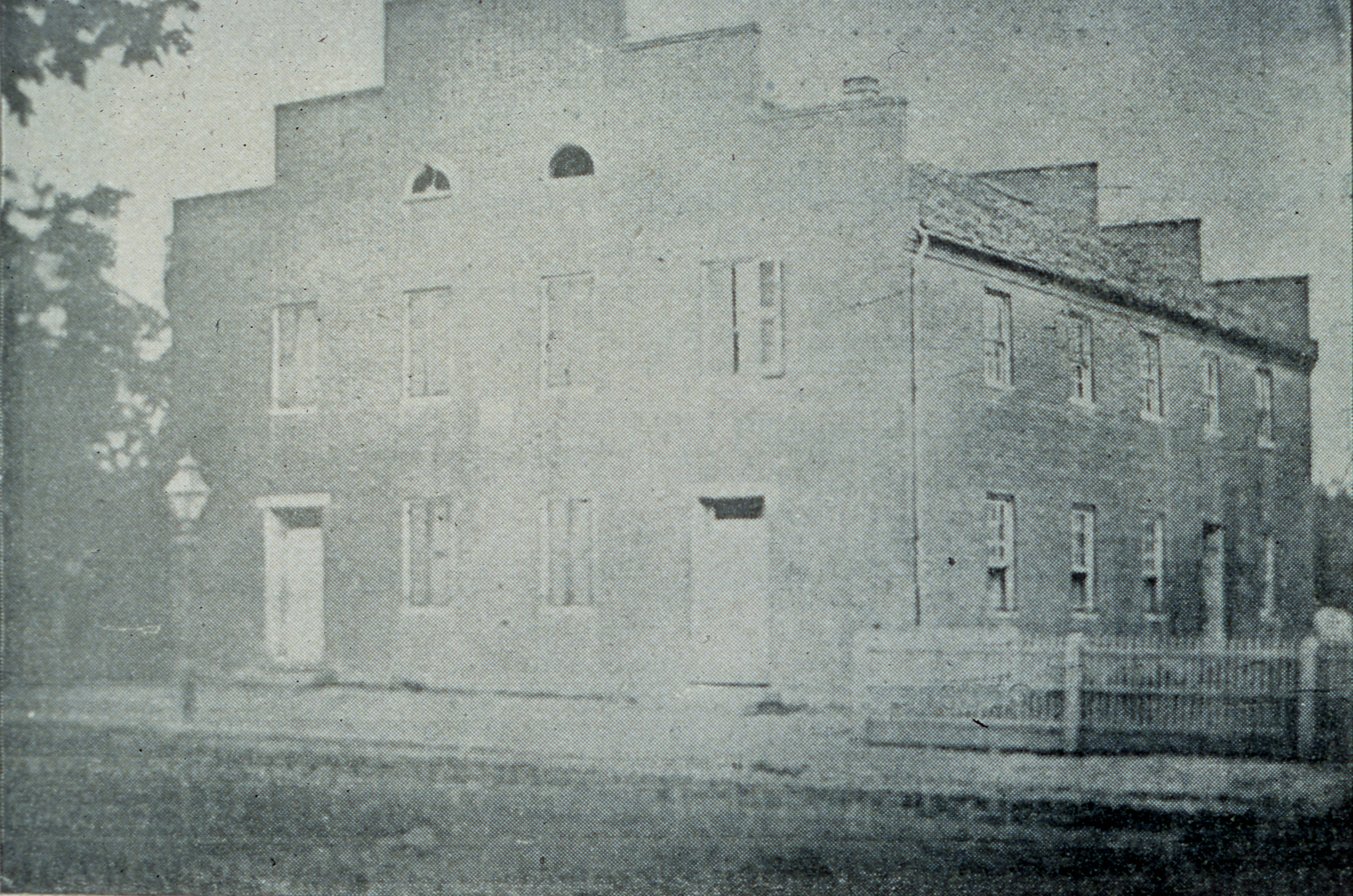
1826-1852 structure

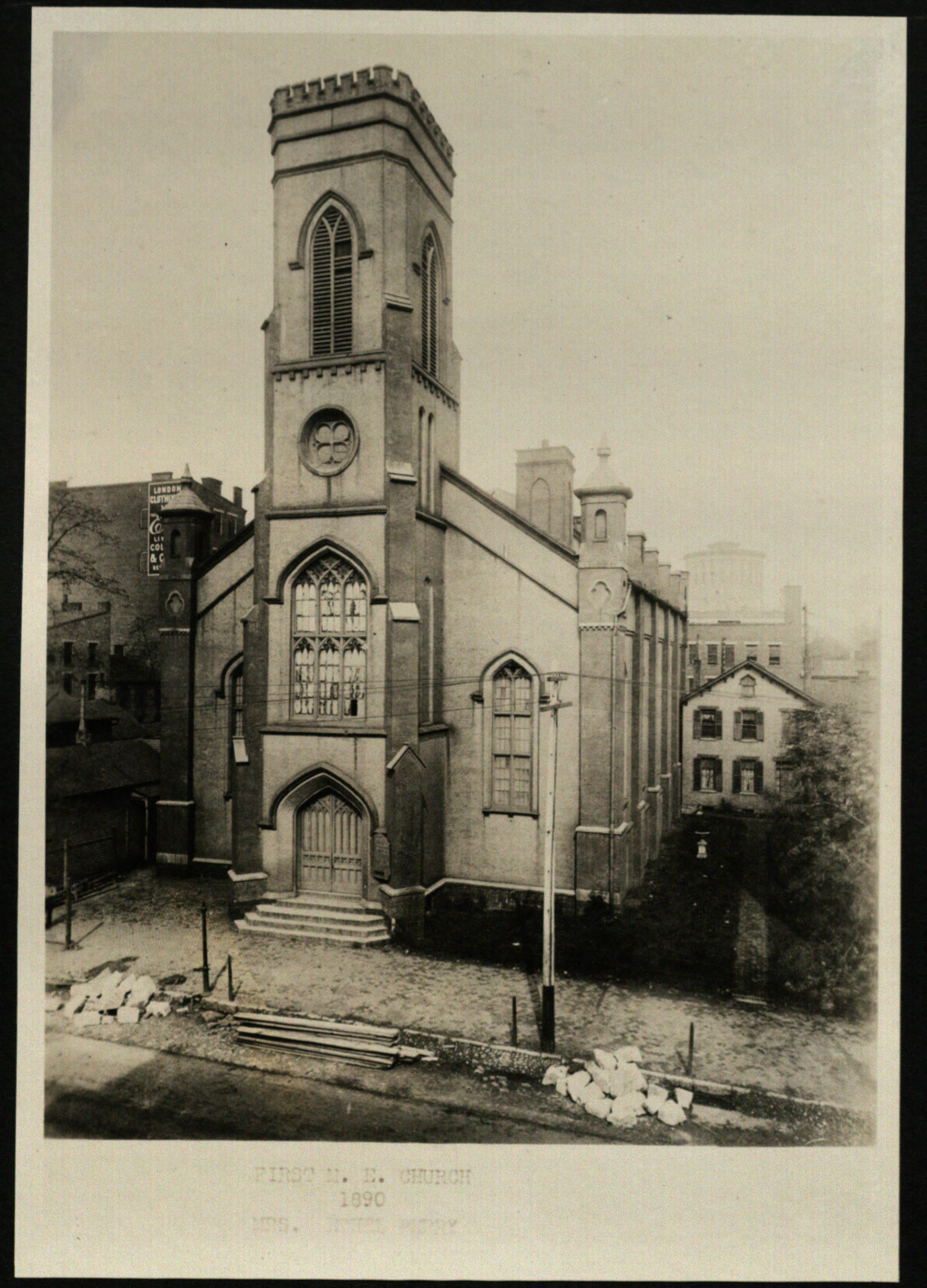
1853-c. 1912 structure, 1890

First Methodist Episcopal Church iterations on the site
First and second floor plans of the building

The founding date of the Columbus Public School Library is unknown. The entity was legally established under a state act passed in 1846, though records are lost on when it was created; possibly 1848 or 1847. In 1847, amid gradation of the city's public schools, a library for books on education and the theory and practice of teaching was formed early during the administration of the first superintendent, Dr. Asa Dearborn Lord. The city's high school and grammar departments had separate libraries as early as 1853. At the time, the Columbus Metropolitan Library did not exist; it was founded in 1873 in the Columbus City Hall. The Board of Education donated hundreds of books to this reading room, for its opening and in later years. In 1876 the city and school libraries were temporarily united, both governed by a single board of trustees and a single librarian. The combined library began to outgrow its space in City Hall, leading the Board of Education to seek out a new separate home for the school library. As well there was a growing desire, especially over the year in 1889, to have the library under the singular control of the Board of Education. Columbus City Council did not adequately care for or fund the library (having supplied only about a third its total volumes and a third of its 1889 funding), leading the Board of Education to pick up some of their burden. In October 1889, the library committee's chairman proposed an immediate withdrawal of the library to the Front Street School building. The proposal was grouped with other organizational resolutions; a vote was postponed to allow members to read all the resolutions' texts. The chairman's next two attempts were tabled. In February 1890, a new chairman recommended purchasing the Town Street Methodist Episcopal Church and converting it for the school library's use.

On June 3, 1890 the board purchased the Town Street church. Also known as the First Methodist Episcopal Church, the building was built in 1853, and was known for holding the first Republican state convention in Ohio, on March 22, 1854. The building had the largest auditorium in the city at that time. The building was purchased for $35,000. The city and school libraries were ordered separated in May 1890, though its execution was delayed for more than a year. Remodeling the building was also delayed as the city solicitor had filed an injunction against the Board of Education, testing the board's power to purchase real estate for library purposes. The injunction was dissolved by a judge, who then refused a second attempt at an injunction. In January 1891, a Franklin County representative introduced a bill attempting to reconsolidate the city and school libraries, giving control of any school libraries and their buildings to the city. The debate over this bill was reportedly "bitter and prolonged".

Architects F. L. Packard, J. W. Yost, & F.W. Fay were hired July 1, 1890 to remodel the building. Upon dissolution of the city's injunction, their plans were promptly completed, and work began to extensively remodel and furnish the building for library use, completed in 1891. The first librarian, John Henry Spielman, was elected in March 1891, to enter his duties on June 1. The school library was separated from the smaller city library on September 12, 1891; the school library was temporarily moved to the High School building (later known as Central High School).

In February 1892, the library was transferred to the remodeled Town Street building, as workmen were putting finishing touches to its interior. The library consisted of 17,500 volumes (14,000 circulating and 3,500 reference works). 1,200 of these works were rebound, 800 works were retired, an 500 had been lost in a fire in a bindery that year. The building cost $80,000: $35,000 for the site and $45,000 for the remodeling and furnishing.

The library's formal opening was held on April 7, 1892, with invitations to the public, to the city's teachers, and state, county, and city officials. For the opening, the rooms were decorated with cut flowers and potted plants. A mass of people, estimated at at least 20,000, visited the space, which at times led to nearly a crush. The library's opening to issue books took place on April 18. In the first five months of operation, about 1,200 children were granted library cards along with 1,040 adults; this proved to dispel the idea that the library was only or predominantly used by school children. One of the library's architects, Frederick Willis Fay, died early into his career and not long after the building was completed, on September 3, 1892.

Librarian J.H. Spielman died in 1896, and Martin Hensel took over the post. In 1900, Hensel suggested opening a reading room for children in the building. One decade after the library opened, Hensel established branches in fire stations around Columbus. One branch had been established earlier, in the Twenty-Third Street School.

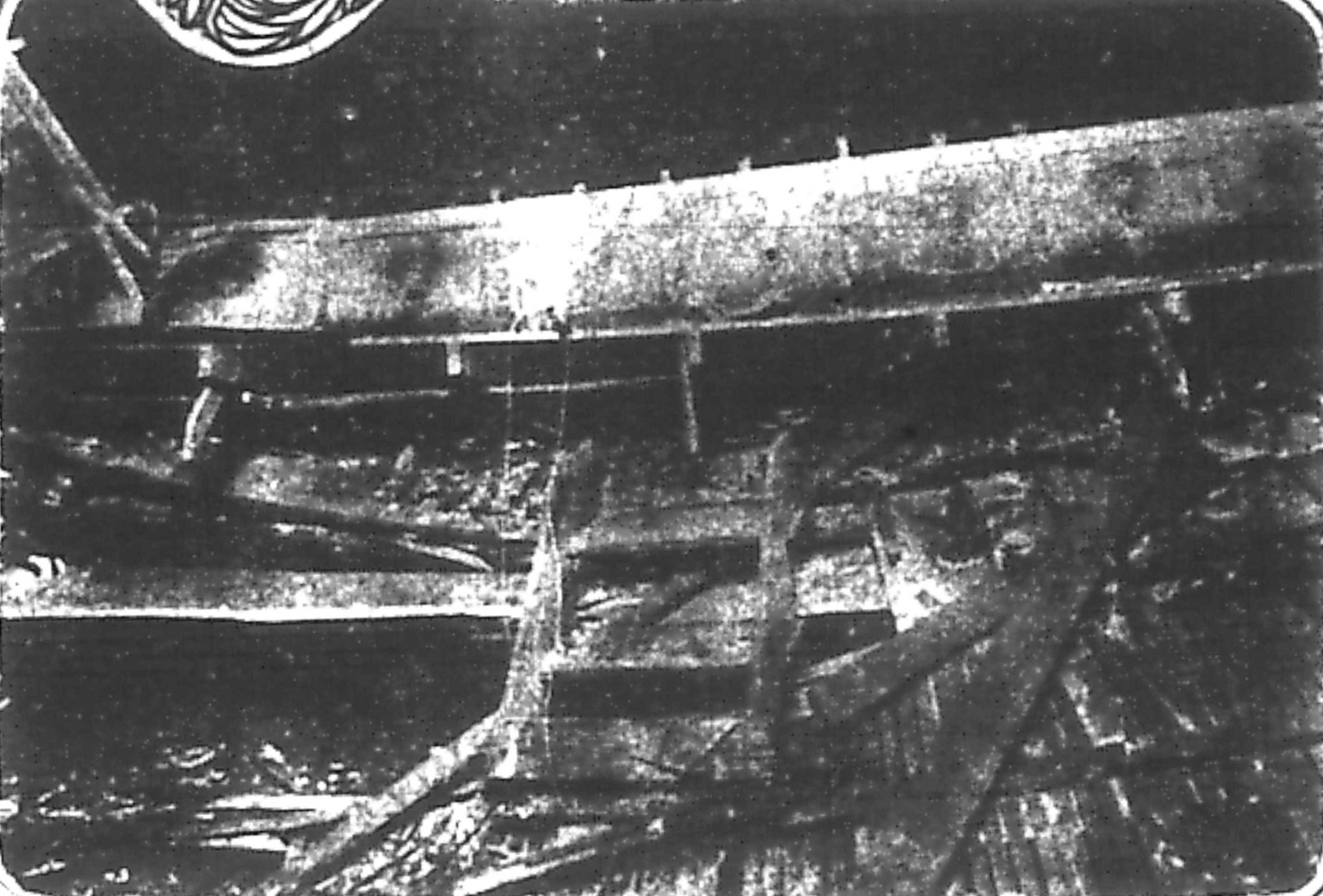
Plaster, timber, and metal wreckage in the school library, 1912

On the morning of September 1, 1912, part of the library's ceiling collapsed. The plaster of the old church covered thousands of reference works and works of fiction, and the steel ceiling put in during the remodel fell into the room as well. In the prior week, pieces of plaster were frequently falling, warning the school authorities. Late in the week, the library was cleared of everything possible and the doors were locked. It was believed that a heavy thunderstorm the prior day, as well as the booming of guns that opened Columbus's centennial celebration one week earlier, dislodged the ceiling. Though books and bookcases were not believed to be well damaged, the walls of the old church were seen as too damaged to consider repairing the building. The library's textbook department was undamaged, located in a building recently constructed next to the main building.

On September 8, mayor George J. Karb announced his support of a proposal to once again merge the city and school libraries, and to open four branch libraries with the extra books. He proposed repairing the Town Street building for court and city department use. The proposal by the public library's board was rejected by the Board of Education on September 18.

Within a month after the ceiling's collapse, that the school board feared the building would have a second collapse, this time of the roof. This prompted a rush to remove books and bookcases from the building. By September 11, the building had been condemned and it was announced that its offices and library would move into the basement and second floor of the nearby Ohio National Bank building. The new library opened October 1912.

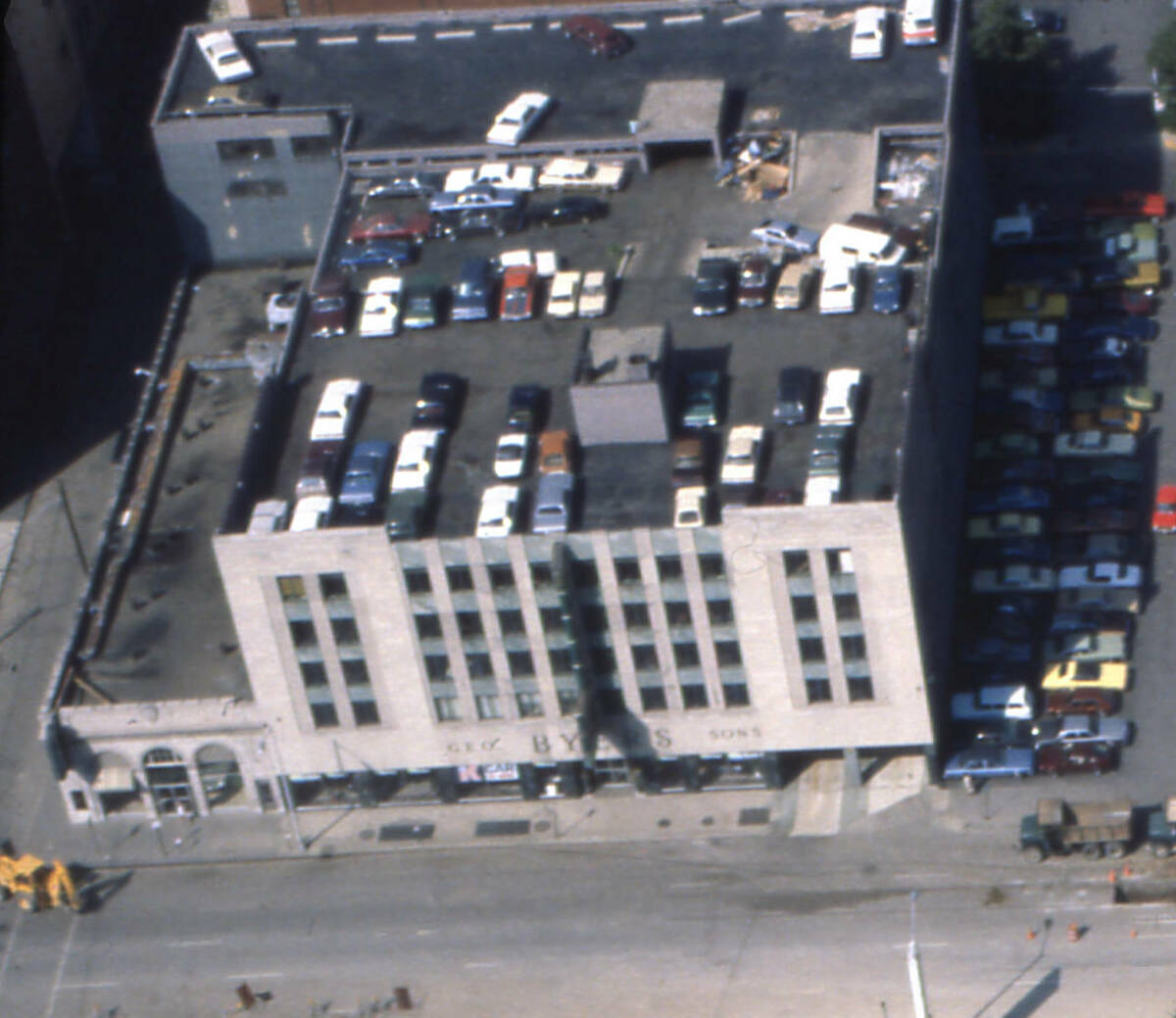
George Byers and Sons dealership and garage, 1980

During the building's demolition, in May 1913, its wrecker found a faded and torn copy of the Sunday School Advocate, published in 1860, evidently placed in the foundation of the building when constructed. In October 1913, the school board considered constructing a new dual-purpose commercial high school and trade school on the site. The old Commercial High School would become used for administrative offices, the school library, the supply department, and other functions. In 1923, the school library and administrative offices moved from the Ohio National Bank building to the Sullivant School. By 1929, a parking garage and car dealership owned by George Byers and Sons (now Byers Auto Group) stood on the site; the site is now a part of the Columbus Commons park.

== See also ==
- List of demolished buildings and structures in Columbus, Ohio
