= Yost & Packard =

Architecture firm based in Columbus, Ohio

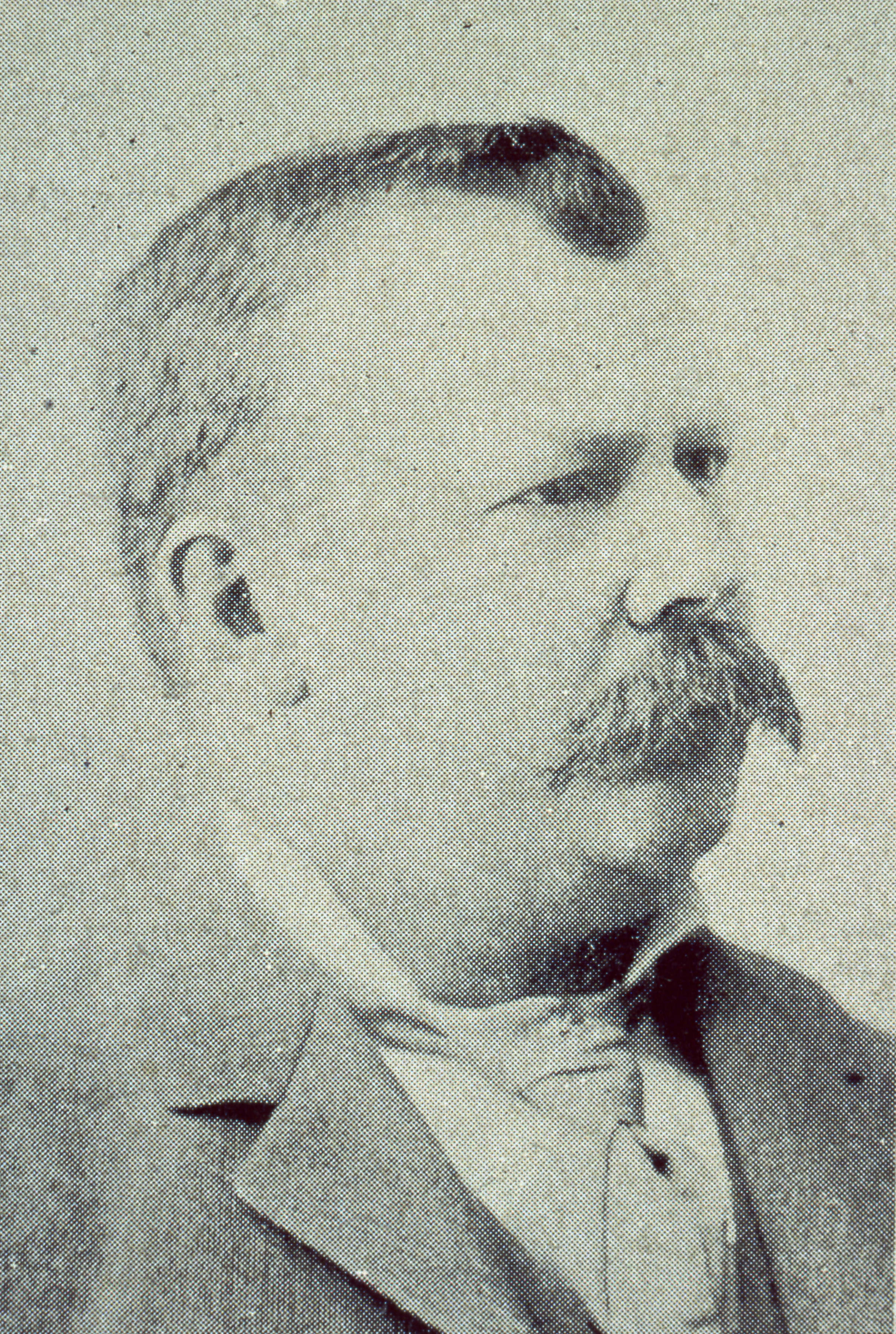
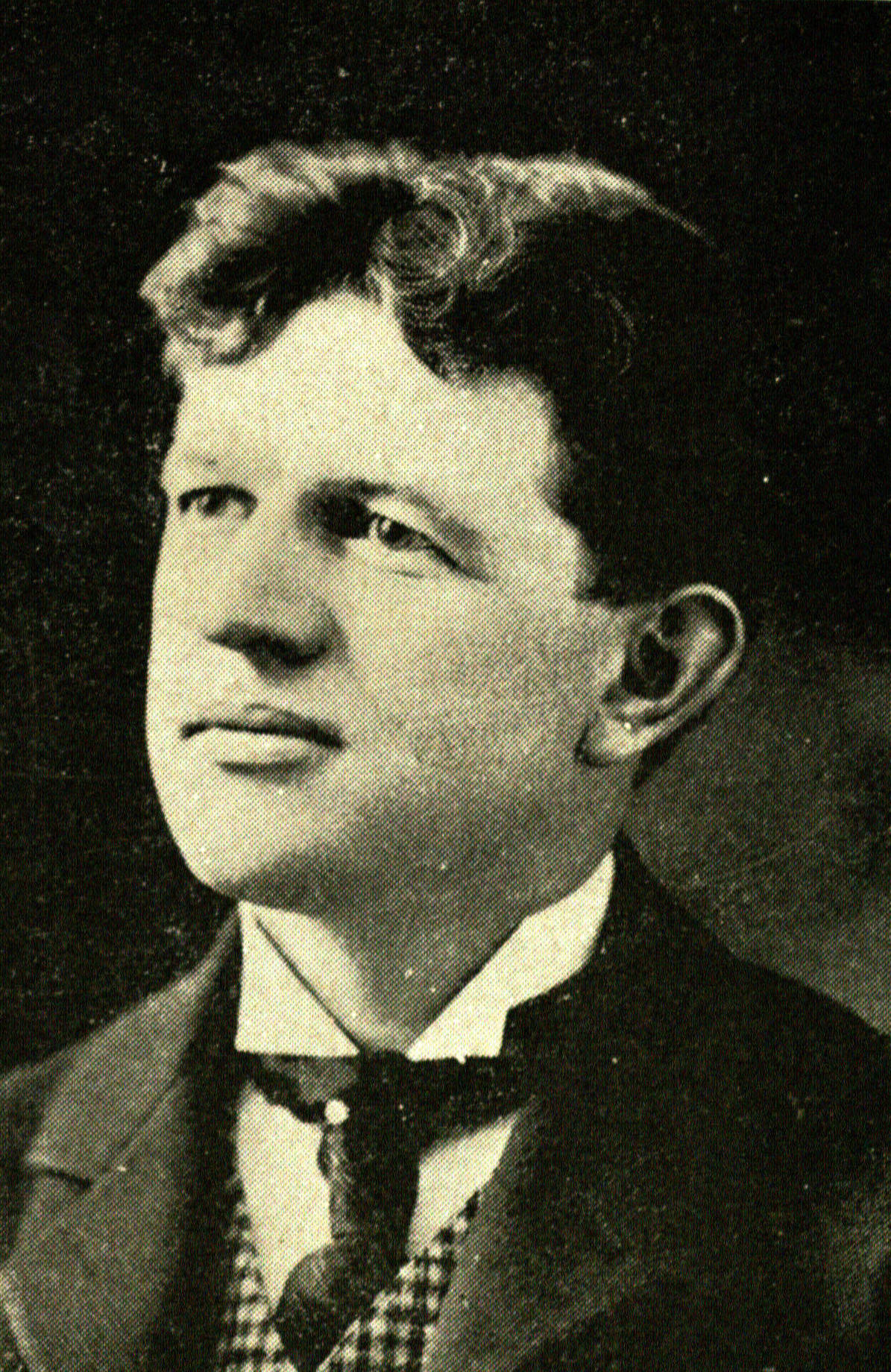
Joseph W. Yost and Frank Packard

Yost & Packard was an architectural firm based in Columbus, Ohio, United States. The firm included partners Joseph W. Yost and Frank Packard. It was founded in 1892 and continued until Yost moved to New York City in 1899, after which Packard took up practice in his own name.

The firm was known for many public buildings, and the prolific use of masonry, especially Berea sandstone, along with tile roofs with flared eaves, polygonal turrets, and intricate ornamentation. Their works resemble elements of Richardsonian Romanesque architecture blended with the creative Victorian works of Frank Furness.

== Selected works ==
Notable works by Yost & Packard include:

=== In Columbus ===
Historical name	Image	Address	Date completed	Status	Notes
Armory and Gymnasium		60 N. Oval Drive	1898	Demolished	
Biological Building		101 S. Oval Drive	1898	Demolished	
Boiler and Power Houses		1961 Bohannan Drive	1892, 1896	Demolished	Also known as the Brown Hall Annex
Botanical Building		181 S. Oval Drive	1892	Demolished	
Broad Street M.E. Church		501 E. Broad Street	1885	In use	National Register and Columbus Register-listed
Chemical Laboratory		154 N. Oval Drive	1891	Demolished	Also known as Chemistry Building No. 2.
Children's Hospital		Fair & Miller Avenues	1893	Demolished	Original location of the modern-day Nationwide Children's Hospital
Columbus Auditorium		W. Goodale Street	1897	Demolished	Extensively remodeled existing building
Columbus Central St. Ry. Office Building		842 Cleveland Avenue	1890s	Vacant	
Columbus Central St. Ry. Power House		Cleveland & Reynolds Avenues	1894	Demolished	
Eastwood Congregational		1080 E. Broad Street	1892	In use	Now the Pilgrim Missionary Baptist Church
The Great Southern Hotel and The Great Southern Opera (advisory)		310 S. High Street	1896	In use	National Register and Columbus Register-listed
The Hanna Paint Company building		111 E. Long Street		Demolished	
Hayes Hall		108 N. Oval Mall	1893	In use	National Register-listed, OSU building
Hotel Chittenden and Henrietta Theater		205 N. High Street	1895	Demolished	
Masonic Temple		34 N. 4th Street	1898	In use	National Register-listed. One among several initial architects before further expansions
Mt. Vernon Ave. M.E. Church		Mt. Vernon Avenue and 18th Street		Demolished	
Neil Ave. M.E. Church		610 Neil Avenue		In use	Now The Sanctuary on Neil
Neil House (remodeling)		41 S. High Street		Demolished	
O.L. Rankin house		98 Buttles Avenue		Demolished	Also known as the E.W. Vance house and as Hutchinson Hall, nurse's home for White Cross Hospital
Orton Hall		155 Oval Drive South	1893	In use	National Register-listed, OSU building
Peter Sells House		755 Dennison Avenue	1895	In use	National Register-listed
Public School Library		4 E. Town Street	1892	Demolished	Remodeled former church
Second German M.E. Church		119 E. Gates Street		In use	Now Gates-Fourth United Methodist Church
St. Francis R. C. Church		386 Buttles Avenue	1896	In use	Also known as St. Francis of Assisi Catholic Church
T&OC Passenger Station		379 W. Broad Street	1895	In use	National Register-listed
Town Street M.E. Church		873 Bryden Road	1900	In use	Now the First AME Zion Church
Twenty-Third Street School		1235 Mt. Vernon Avenue	1888	Demolished	Later known as Mount Vernon Junior High School
Universalist Church		331 E. State Street	1891	Demolished	
YMCA Building		34 S. 3rd Street	1893	Demolished	Moved to the Downtown YMCA building in 1923; site now occupied by the Columbus Dispatch Building

Additionally, the Charles Frederick Myers house in Columbus is suspected to be a Yost & Packard work.

=== Outside Columbus ===
Historical name	Image	Address	Date completed	Status	Notes
Harrison County Courthouse		100 W. Market Street, Cadiz, Ohio	1895	In use	National Register-listed
Westerville High School-Vine Street School		44 N. Vine Street, Westerville, Ohio	1896	In use	Now the Emerson Elementary School. National Register-listed.
Wood County Courthouse and Jail		1 Court House Square, Bowling Green, Ohio	1896	In use	National Register-listed
First Church of Christ, Scientist		2704 Monroe Street, Toledo, Ohio	1898	In use	National Register-listed
Odd Fellows' Home for Orphans, Indigent and Aged		Springfield, Ohio	1898	In use	National Register-listed
St. Joseph's Catholic School		Wapakoneta, Ohio	1899	In use	National Register-listed
Wyandot County Courthouse and Jail		Upper Sandusky, Ohio	1900	In use	National Register-listed
Loewenstein and Sons Hardware Building		Charleston, West Virginia	1900	In use	National Register-listed
Marion County Court House		Fairmont, West Virginia	1900	In use	National Register-listed
Franklin College Building No. 5		New Athens, Ohio	1900	In use	National Register-listed

Additionally, the firm designed the First Presbyterian Church, Urbana High School, the Pennsylvania Railroad Depot, and a barn for Frank Chance at 438 Scioto Street, and the house of Mrs. M.J. Laudenbach (524 Scioto Street), all in Urbana, Ohio. In St. Marys, Ohio, the firm designed the Grand Opera House (105-113 W. Spring St., 1895, extant) and the Gustave Bamberger residence (225 South Wayne Street, built 1895, extant).

== See also ==
- Architecture of Columbus, Ohio
