= Chittenden Hotel =

Former hotel in Columbus, Ohio, U.S.

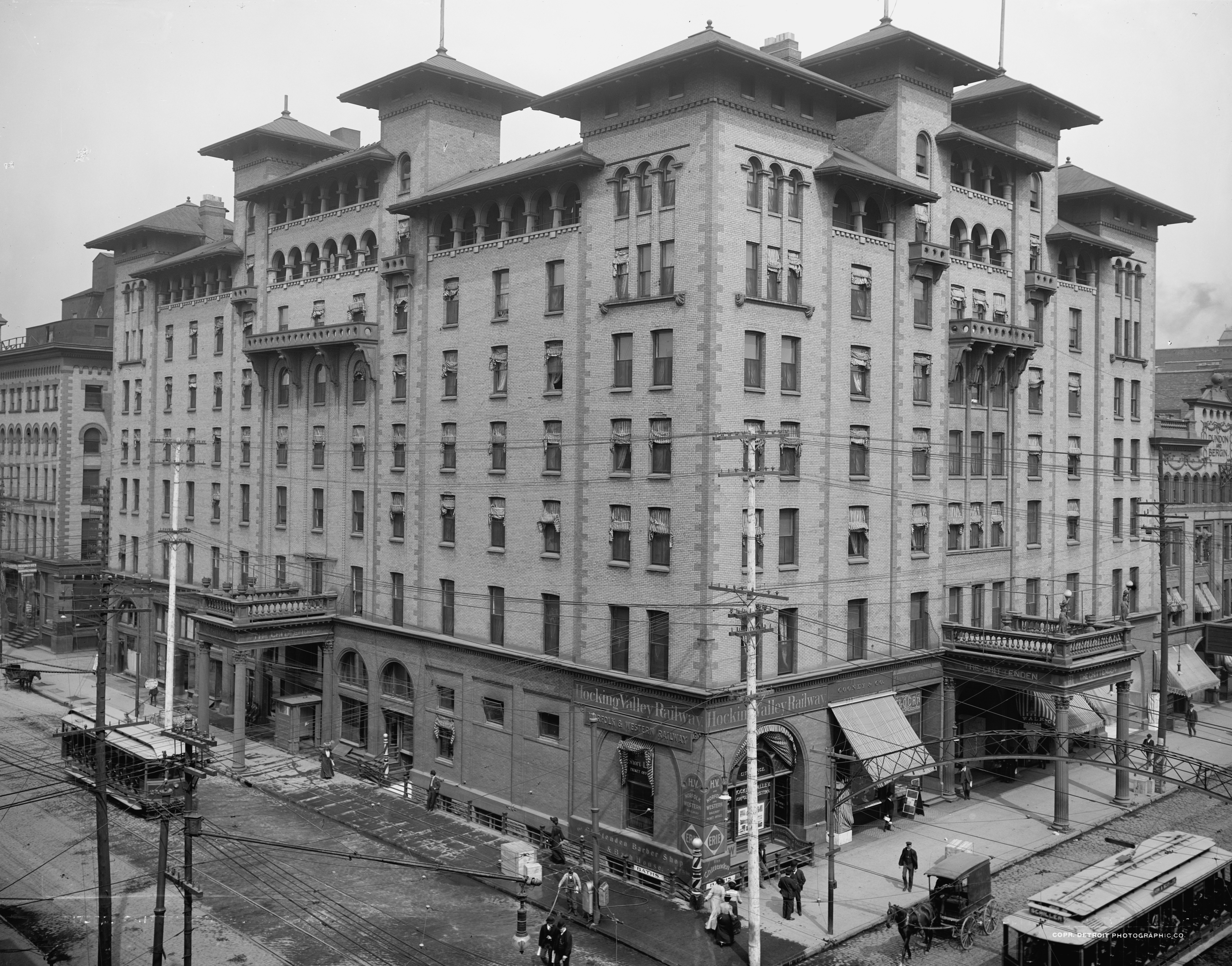
- The third Chittenden Hotel building
- Present-day site of the hotel

General information
- Location: 205 N. High St., Columbus, Ohio
- Coordinates: 39.966515°N 83.002206°W
- Opened: 1889
- Closed: 1972
- Demolished: 1973

Technical details
- Floor count: 8 (3rd building)

Design and construction
- Architecture firm: George Bellows Sr. (2nd building); Yost & Packard (3rd building)

The Chittenden Hotel was a hotel building in Downtown Columbus, Ohio. The hotel, located at Spring and High streets, was in three succeeding buildings. The first was built in 1889; the second in 1892; and the third in 1895.

The Chittenden was created by Columbus businessman Henry Treat Chittenden, known for owning the Columbus Railway Company, in the horsecar and streetcar business. He was also involved in real estate and the arts, and was educated in and practiced law. Chittenden had seen William Neil, a stagecoach entrepreneur, make a second fortune with his Neil House hotel, inspiring Chittenden to follow suit. In 1873, he purchased the five-story Parker Building, an office building with retail space. In the late 1880s, he converted it into the first Chittenden hotel, adding two floors among other extensive renovations. It opened in 1889. The building was gutted in a large fire in 1890. The next building was constructed in 1892 in a more lavish style by Columbus architect George Bellows Sr. Chittenden built theaters around it – the Henrietta on Spring St. and the Park on High St.; he also built a massive auditorium nearby.

A block-wide fire demolished the second hotel on November 25, 1893, spreading from the unfinished auditorium to the hotel and Henrietta Theater. The city block had damage of about $300,000; Chittenden had only insured the hotel for $50,000. Undeterred by the fires, Henry Chittenden built his third hotel in 1895, using solid materials including stone, steel, concrete, and brick. The eight-story building was held under the Chittenden family's ownership, past his death in 1909, until it was sold in the early 1950s. It was sold to the Temple of Good Will, which planned to build a skyscraper in Columbus. The organization struggled with operating the hotel. It restricted any liquor sales there, and found it difficult to have commercial and other travelers in its rooms and restaurants without alcohol sales.

Just after 1960, the hotel's Moorish towers and eaves were removed to lower maintenance costs. The third hotel was the longest-lasting. It closed on March 15, 1972 and was demolished in February 1973.

The high-rise William Green Building stands at the site of the hotel.

The Chittenden Hotel in 1963
