= William Green Building =

Skyscraper in Columbus, Ohio

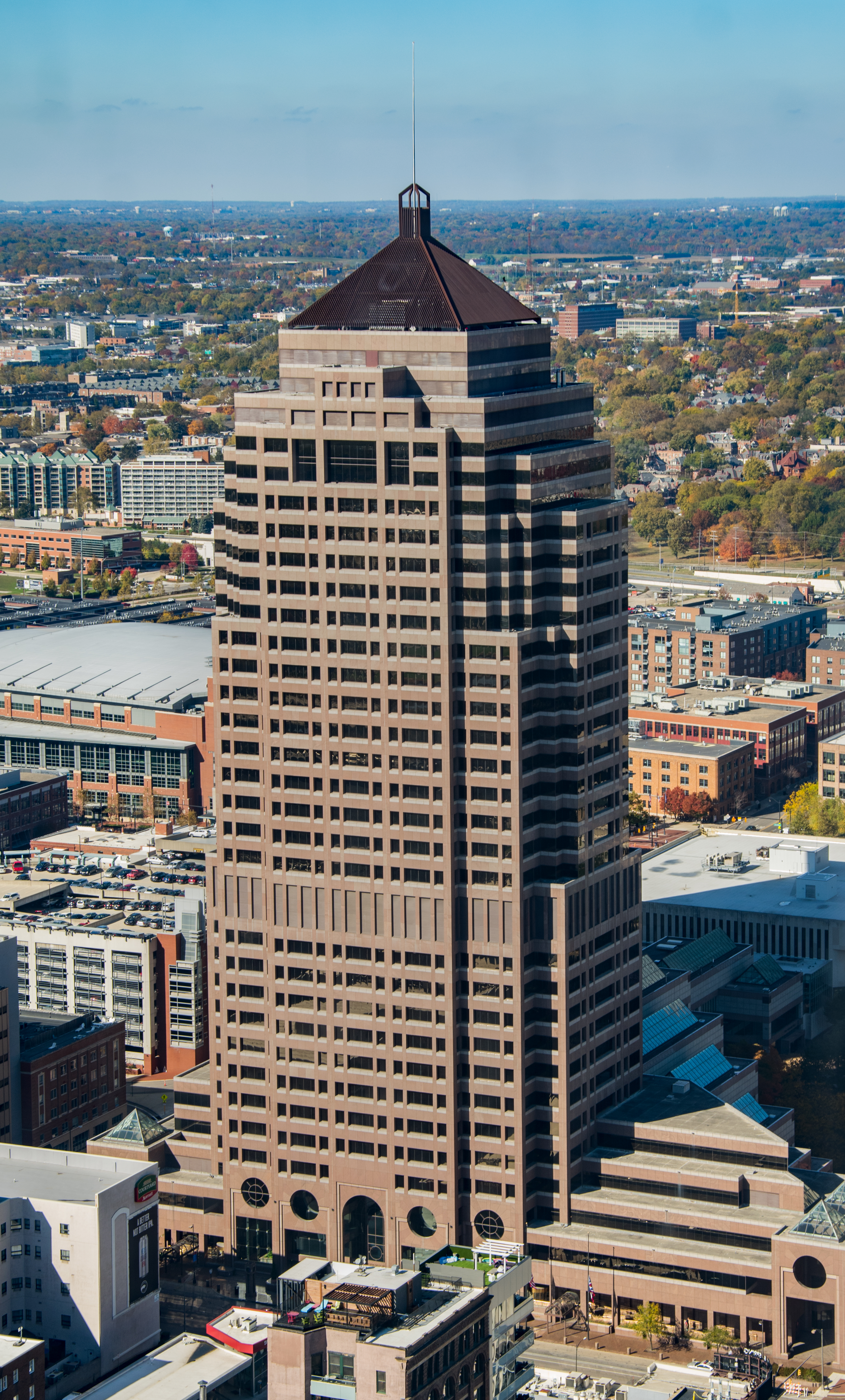
- Interactive map of the William Green Building area

General information
- Type: Office
- Location: 30 West Spring Street, Columbus, Ohio, U.S.
- Coordinates: 39°57′59″N 83°00′10″W
- Construction started: 1987; 39 years ago
- Completed: 1990; 36 years ago

Height
- Roof: 530 ft (160 m)

Technical details
- Floor count: 33
- Floor area: 1,020,063 sq ft (94,767.0 m^{2})

Design and construction
- Architect: NBBJ
- Main contractor: Turner Construction Company

The William Green Building is a 530-foot (160 m), 33-floor skyscraper in Columbus, Ohio, United States. It was constructed from 1987 to 1990, and was topped out on June 8, 1988. It is the third-tallest building in Columbus, the tallest constructed in 1990s and the eighth-tallest building in Ohio. The low-rise wing that extends to North High Street is constructed on the former site of the Chittenden Hotel.

The building is named after William B. Green (March 3, 1873 – November 21, 1952) who was an American trade union leader.

The offices of the Ohio Bureau of Workers' Compensation are located here.

== See also ==
- List of tallest buildings in Columbus
