= Herbert Baumer =

American architect (1885–1972)

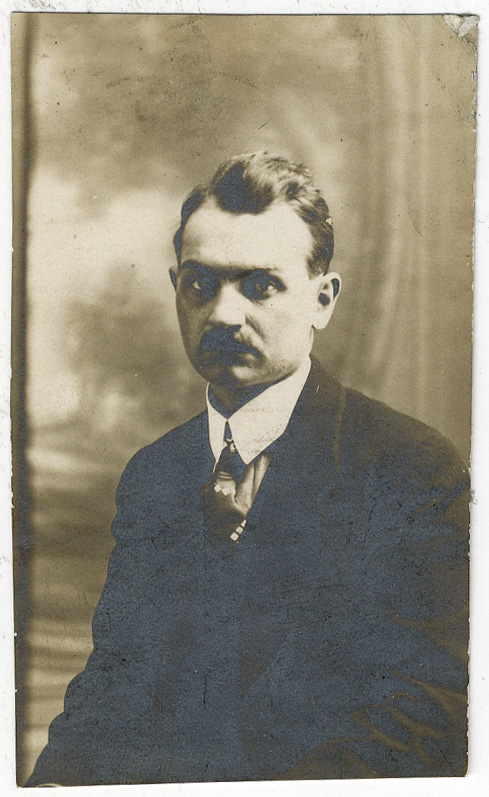
Herbert Baumer - Sourced from Knowlton School Archives

Herbert Herndon Baumer (October 31, 1885 – July 14, 1972) was an American architect and professor of architecture at the Ohio State University.

== Early years ==
Baumer was born in Montgomery, Alabama, to Captain Joseph Baumer and Adelia Sevier Baumer. His father, a Confederate veteran of the Civil War, was Clerk of Naval Affairs to the U.S. House of Representatives. In 1896 his mother died, leaving him and his two younger brothers, Sevier and Joseph, under the care of their father, who remarried two years later.

He received his early education in Washington, D.C., graduating from the William McKinley Manual Training School in 1903. He studied privately under Nathan Wyeth of Washington, D.C., a graduate of the Ecole des Beaux Arts of Paris. In 1905, he entered the office of the Supervising Architect of the United States, where he remained four years, part of which time was devoted to architectural work at the Panama Canal.

== Paris ==
Baumer resigned his position with the Supervising Architect to go to Paris, where he was admitted to the Ecole des Beaux Arts in June 1911, and received into the Atelier Bernier-Pontremoli. For several years he worked in the Ecole, traveled extensively in Europe, and became associated with Achille Duchêne. While with Duchêne he worked on several large projects executed in the United States, including the Parkway scheme for Philadelphia, the Widener Estate near Philadelphia and the setting for the Municipal Art Gallery of Philadelphia. This work was in charge of Jacques Greber, architect of Philadelphia.

In 1917, shortly after the arrival of the American forces in Europe, Baumer joined the American army and was commissioned a first lieutenant of engineers. He was promoted to captain and served throughout World War I in France, being honorably discharged in Paris, November, 1919.

Returning to the Ecole des Beaux Arts, he completed his thesis and was awarded the Diplome d'Architecte. Soon after, the French government conferred the distinction "Officier de l'Academie."

== Teaching career and private practice ==
Early in 1921 Baumer returned to New York, entering the office of Severance & Van Allen, Architects as a designer.

In the fall of 1922, he was prevailed upon by Joseph N. Bradford, professor of architecture and university architect, to accept the appointment of professor of architecture at the Ohio State University. His tenure was continuous through his elevation to professor emeritus in 1956. During the early part of this teaching period he was design associate with Bradford, and several of the buildings on the Ohio State University campus are to his credit, including Orton Hall (with Joseph W. Yost), Arps Hall, Hamilton Hall, Pomerene Hall (with Howard Dwight Smith), and Derby Hall.

In private practice during this time, Baumer was architect for a number of buildings, including:

- The General Science Building at Antioch College, Yellow Springs, Ohio
- Koch Hall (formerly the "Laboratories Building") at Wittenberg College, Springfield, Ohio
- The original Airport Terminal Building at the Columbus, Ohio Airport
- The Players Club Theatre, Columbus, Ohio
- Camp Mary Orton, north of Worthington, Ohio
- Dodge Memorial Gymnasium, Wright Patterson Air Force Base, Dayton, Ohio
- The Officers Club at Orlando Air Force Base, Orlando, Florida

Baumer became a fellow of the AIA in 1964.

== World War II ==
From 1919 to 1942 he remained in the armed forces on reserve status.

In 1942, Baumer entered the Air Corps as a major and served through the duration of the war, returning to civilian status as a lieutenant colonel. During this time he supervised the preparation and maintenance of master plans for all Air Technical Service Command installations and was awarded the Commendation Ribbon in 1946.
