= Eleanor Brown (disambiguation) =

Eleanor Brown (born 1973) is an American novelist.

Eleanor Brown may also refer to:

- Eleanor Brown (footballer) (born 2000), Australian rules footballer
- Eleanor Brown (interior designer) (1890–1991), American interior designer
- Eleanor Gertrude Brown (1887–1964), American scholar and educator
- Eleanor P. Brown (born 1954), American economist
