= Charles Frederick Myers house =

Historic house in Columbus, Ohio

- U.S. Historic district – Contributing property
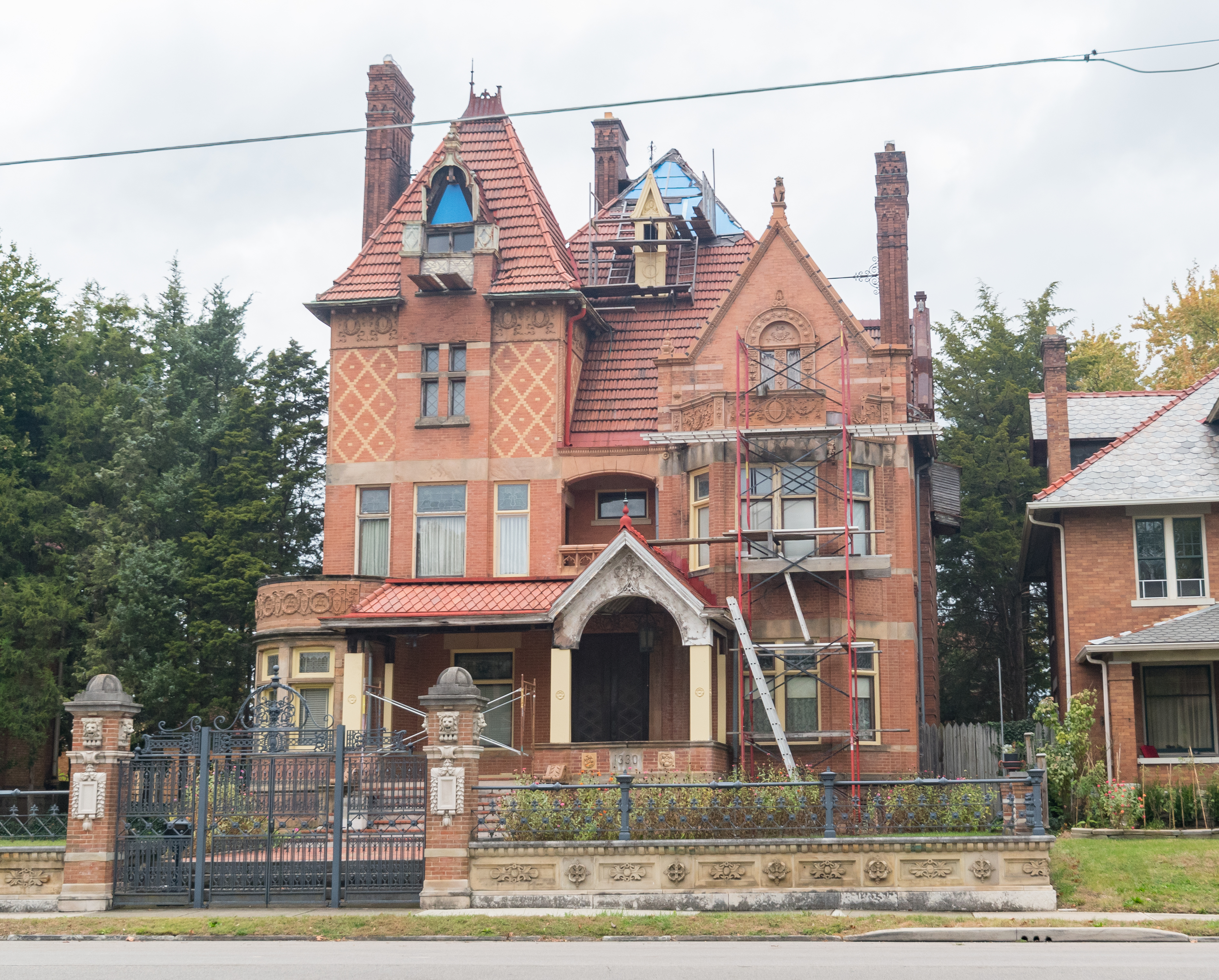
- Location: 1330 Bryden Road, Columbus, Ohio
- Coordinates: 39.960641°N 82.964214°W
- Built: 1896
- Architectural style: Eclectic
- Part of: Columbus Near East Side District; Bryden Road District

The Charles Frederick Myers house is a historic private residence in the Franklin Park neighborhood of Columbus, Ohio, United States. The house was built in 1896 in an eclectic style. It was added to the Columbus Near East Side District (part of the National Register of Historic Places) in 1978, and the Bryden Road District (part of the Columbus Register of Historic Properties) in 1990.

== Design ==
The Charles Frederick Myers house was built in an eclectic style, including elements of Romanesque Revival, neo-French Provincial, and Queen Anne architecture. It was among the most ornate houses built in the city in the 19th century, built on Bryden Road (one of three streets in Columbus where the grandest houses were built, along with East Main and East Broad). It is one of the largest and most ornate houses on the street and in the Bryden Road District. The architect is unknown, though is suspected to be a work of architect Joseph W. Yost or his firm Yost & Packard. The home's design has numerous similarities to the Joseph Warren Yost House, situated on Bryden a few blocks to the west.

The exterior includes a square tower at the southwest corner, with diagonal brick details. The house has steep tile roofs with dormers, decorative chimneys, and terra cotta ornaments. An ornate fence and gate surround the property, though they are not original to the house.

The house, upon completion, had a lavish interior with heavily carved wood, including black and Circassian walnut, mahogany, and cherry. Myers hired an artist from Germany to decorate the interior and paint murals.

The house's centerpiece is the Great Hall, which has a large central stairway with a landing extending the length of the room. The stair's newel post has four sculpted heads, once said to have been of a kaiser, though altered during World War I. The room also included a "Turkish Alcove" with a tented ceiling, cushions, oriental lamps, and Syrian draperies.

The house has about 18 rooms, in addition to several unfinished spaces. It has four floors and an elevator.

== History ==
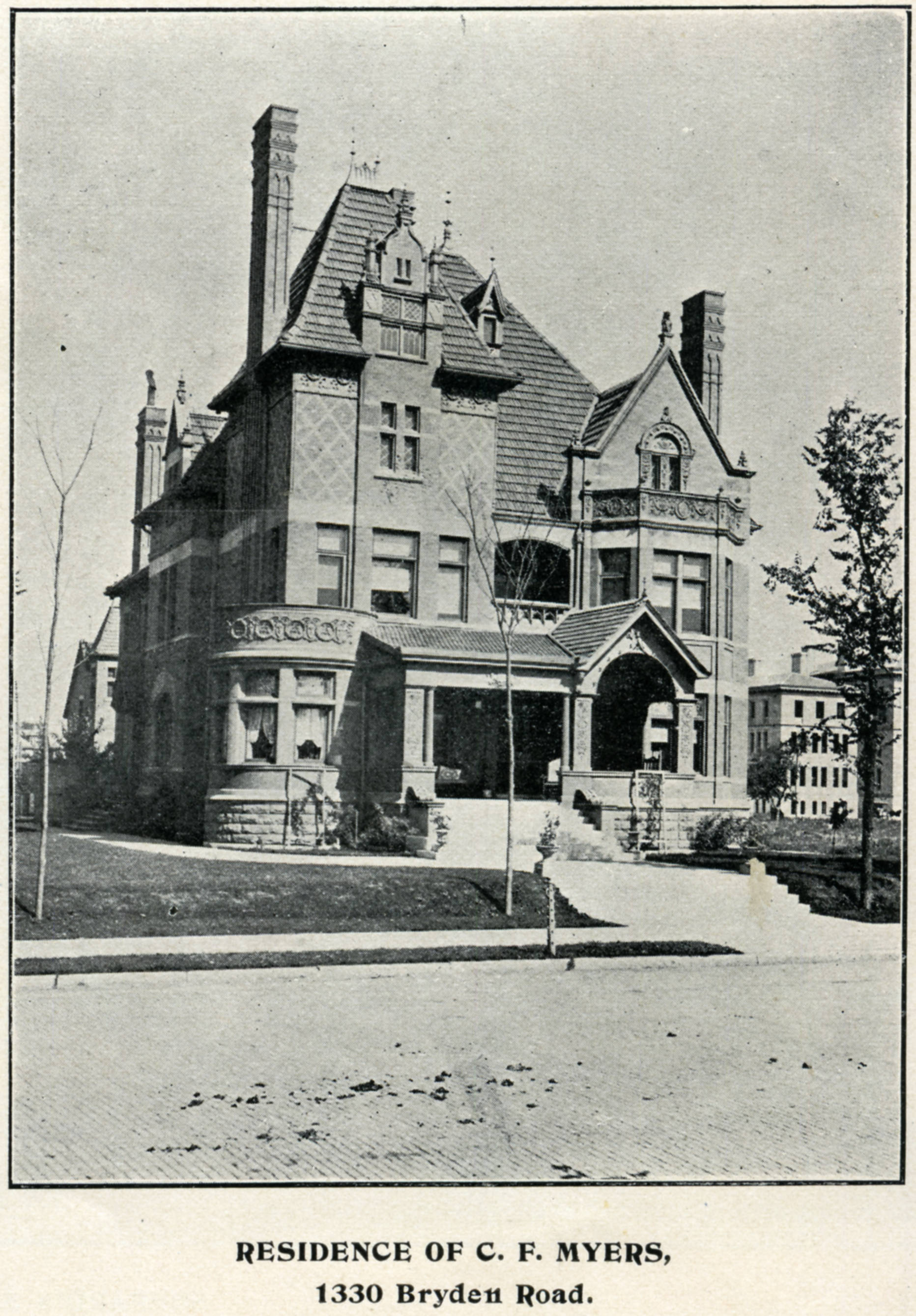
The house c. 1898

The mansion was built in 1896 for Charles Frederick Myers, founder and owner of the United States Carriage Company. It was noted to be one of Myers' greatest legacies, as one of the finest residential buildings in the city. The elaborate structure was said to have been designed after a castle in Myers' homeland in Germany. The house's construction required water and sewer lines to be extended east from Wilson Avenue. Upon completion, the Myers family lived in it for several years, though Charles died during a trip to Germany only a few years after the home was finished.

From 1921 to 1940, the Ryan family lived in the house, and the "Rinkey-Dink" neighborhood club met there. After 1940, the house was turned into a nursing home. The house was part of the Stella Marshall Memorial Homes, which operated nursing facilities in neighboring houses. Many of these, including the Myers house, ceased to operate in 1977 when found to be uncompliant with state standards.

It was added to the Columbus Near East Side District (part of the National Register of Historic Places) in 1978, and the Bryden Road District (part of the Columbus Register of Historic Properties) in 1990.

== See also ==
- National Register of Historic Places listings in Columbus, Ohio
