= Joseph W. Yost =

American architect

Joseph Warren Yost
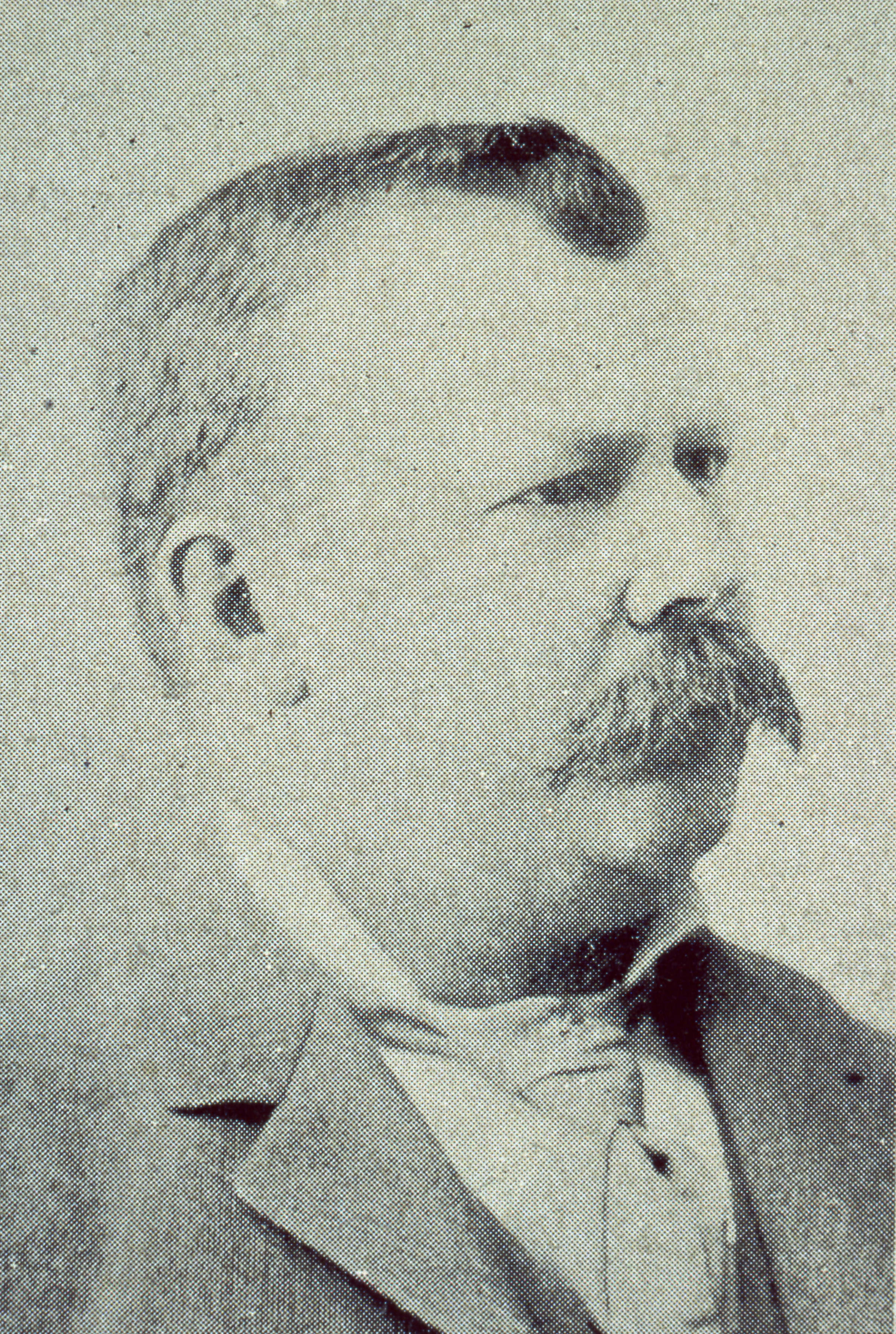
- Yost in 1896
- Born: 1847; Clarington, Ohio
- Died: November 2, 1923; Avalon, Pennsylvania
- Occupation: Architect
- Buildings: Orton Hall, First Church of Christ, Scientist, several courthouses

Joseph Warren Yost (1847 – November 2, 1923) was a prominent architect from Ohio whose works included many courthouses and other public buildings. Some of his most productive years were spent as a member of the Yost and Packard partnership with Frank Packard. Later in his career, he joined Albert D'Oench at the New York City based firm D'Oench & Yost. A number of his works are listed for their architecture in the U.S. National Register of Historic Places (NRHP).

== Early life ==
Joseph Warren Yost was born in Clarington, Ohio in 1847, son of Joel and Nancy Yost. Yost began architectural studies in 1869 under the direction of Joseph Fairfax, an architect from Wheeling, West Virginia. After finishing his apprenticeship he started his own architecture firm in Bellaire.

== Life in Columbus ==
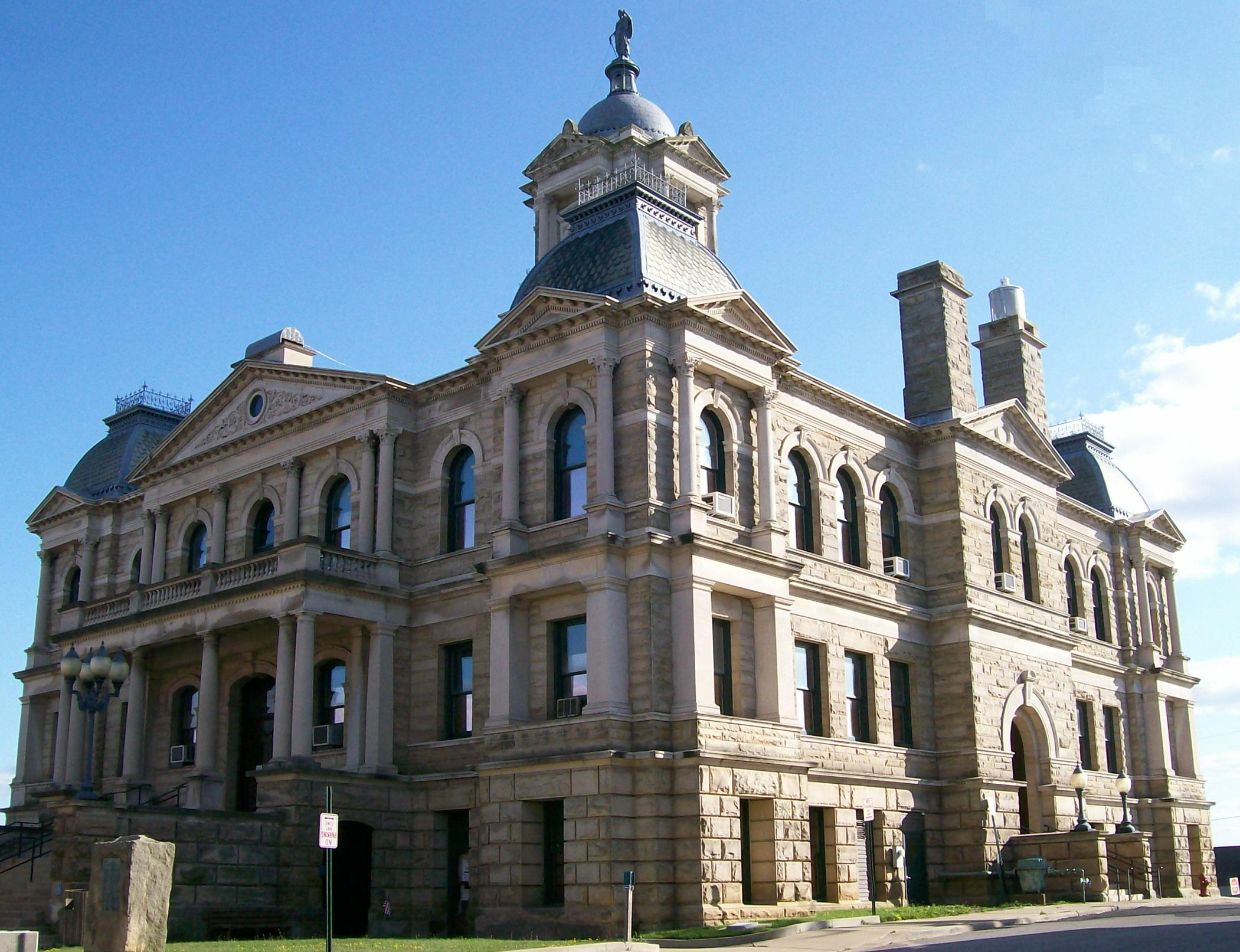
Harrison County Courthouse, a Yost & Packard work

Yost made a decision in 1882 to move his firm to Columbus with the hope of more lucrative contracts. The move was a success as his firm became more in demand. The architect built his house in 1884 in Columbus and became an official full-time resident. Yost organized the Association of Ohio Architects in 1885, an association still operating today.

In 1892, Yost entered into partnership with another prominent Columbus architect, Frank Packard to form the firm of Yost & Packard. His nephew, Joel Edward McCarty, was also an architect and worked for the firm. It was around this time he was awarded and completed what may be his most famous work from this time, and possibly his career, Orton Hall at Ohio State University in 1893. His partner Packard was awarded the Hayes Hall on the same campus. During this partnership, a promotional portfolio placed the total count of buildings designed around 230, including several courthouses, other public buildings, and institutional structures in both Ohio and West Virginia.

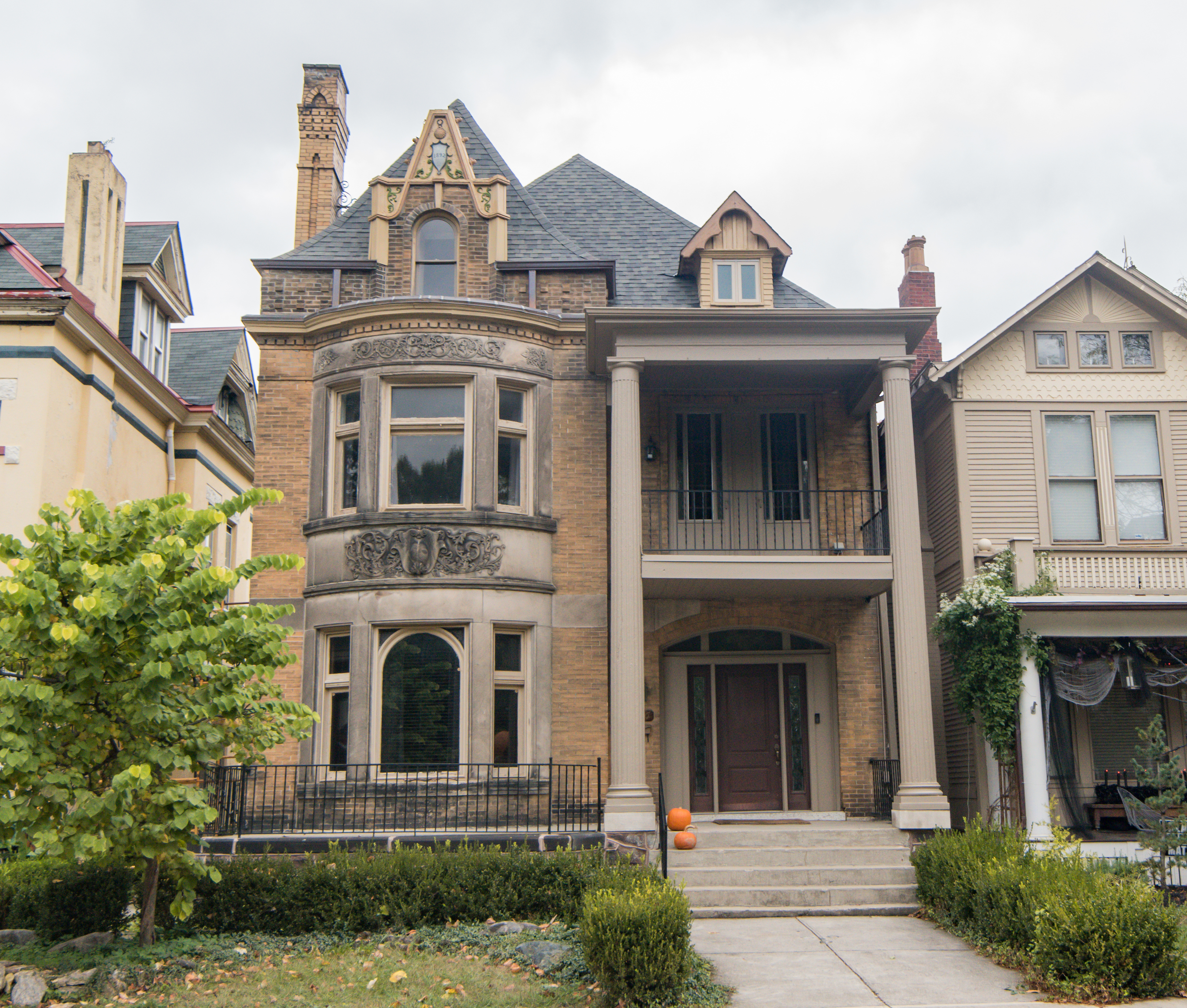
The Joseph W. Yost House in Columbus

While living in Columbus, Yost designed his own house, at 1216 Bryden Road, now a part of the Columbus Near East Side District and Bryden Road District.

== Life in New York City ==
Yost decided to move to New York City in 1900, hoping for larger projects. He partnered with Albert D'Oench to form the firm of D'Oench & Yost in 1901. The firm designed the Guardian Life Insurance Building, the Grace building, and the Morris Hunts' Tribune Building. Yost took up his own private practice after D'Oench died in 1918 and continued working until his retirement in 1921.

Two buildings listed on the National Register of Historic Places (NRHP) are credited to the firm:

- Carnegie Library, Adams and Columbus Ave., Sandusky, Ohio (D'Oench, Albert)
- W New York Union Square (formerly Germania Life Insurance Company Building), 50 Union Sq. E., New York, NY (D'Oench and Yost)

== Death ==
Yost died in Avalon, Pennsylvania at the age of 76.

== Major works ==
=== Individual projects ===
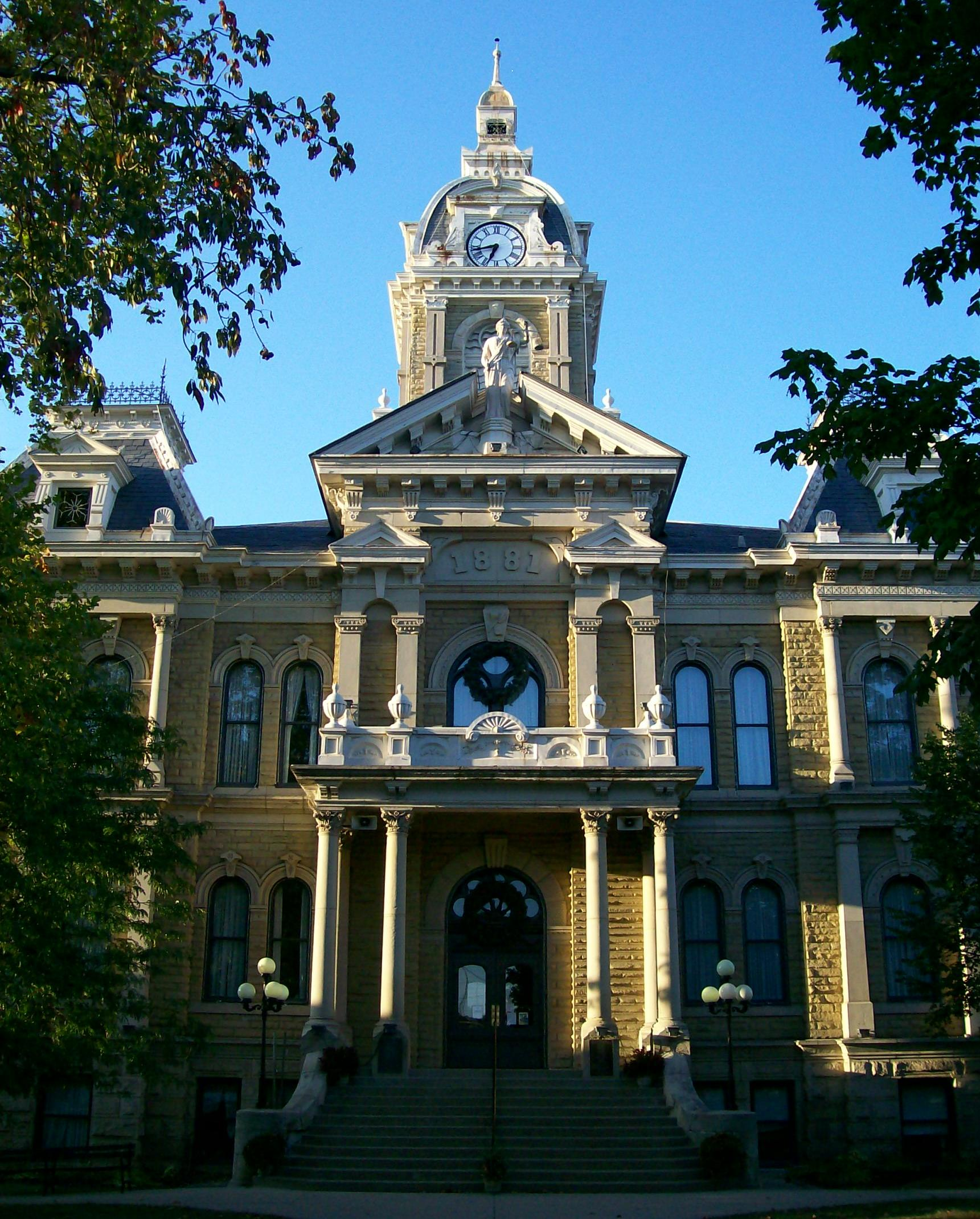
Guernsey County Courthouse

Yost's work includes:

- Belmont County Children's Home (1880), as supervising architect
- Belmont County Courthouse (1885–1888), St. Clairsville, Ohio, NRHP-listed (as contributing within St. Clairsville Historic District)
- Guernsey County Courthouse (1881), 801 Wheeling Avenue, Cambridge, Ohio (National Register-listed)
- Holmes County Courthouse (1884-1886), Millersburg, Ohio
- Miami County Courthouse (1885), Troy, Ohio
- Broad Street United Methodist Church (1885), 501 E. Broad St., Columbus, Ohio (Joseph W. Yost), NRHP-listed
- Perry County Courthouse and jail (1888) at Main Street and Brown Street, New Lexington, Ohio(J.W. Yost), NRHP-listed
- Old Licking County Jail (1889), in Newark, Ohio
- Grand Army of the Republic Memorial Hall (1892), 401 Railroad St., Ironton, Ohio (credited to Yost, Joseph; McLain, W.J.), NRHP-listed
- St. John's Cathedral (1892), Knoxville, Tennessee
- Harrison County Courthouse (1893–1895), Cadiz, Ohio
- Edwards Gymnasium/Pfieffer Natatorium (1905–06), Ohio Wesleyan University Main Campus, S., Sandusky St. Delaware, Ohio, NRHP-listed
- Fort Piqua Hotel (1891) in Piqua, Ohio
- Noble County Jail and Sheriff's Office, 419 West St., Caldwell, Ohio, NRHP-listed
- University Hall-Gray's Chapel, OWU Main Campus, Sandusky St., Delaware, Ohio, NRHP-listed
- One or more works in Wheeling Avenue Historic District, roughly bounded by Steubenville, Tenth, Wheeling, and Fourth Avenues. Cambridge, Ohio, NRHP-listed
