= Joseph Warren Yost House =

Historic house in Columbus, Ohio

- U.S. Historic district – Contributing property
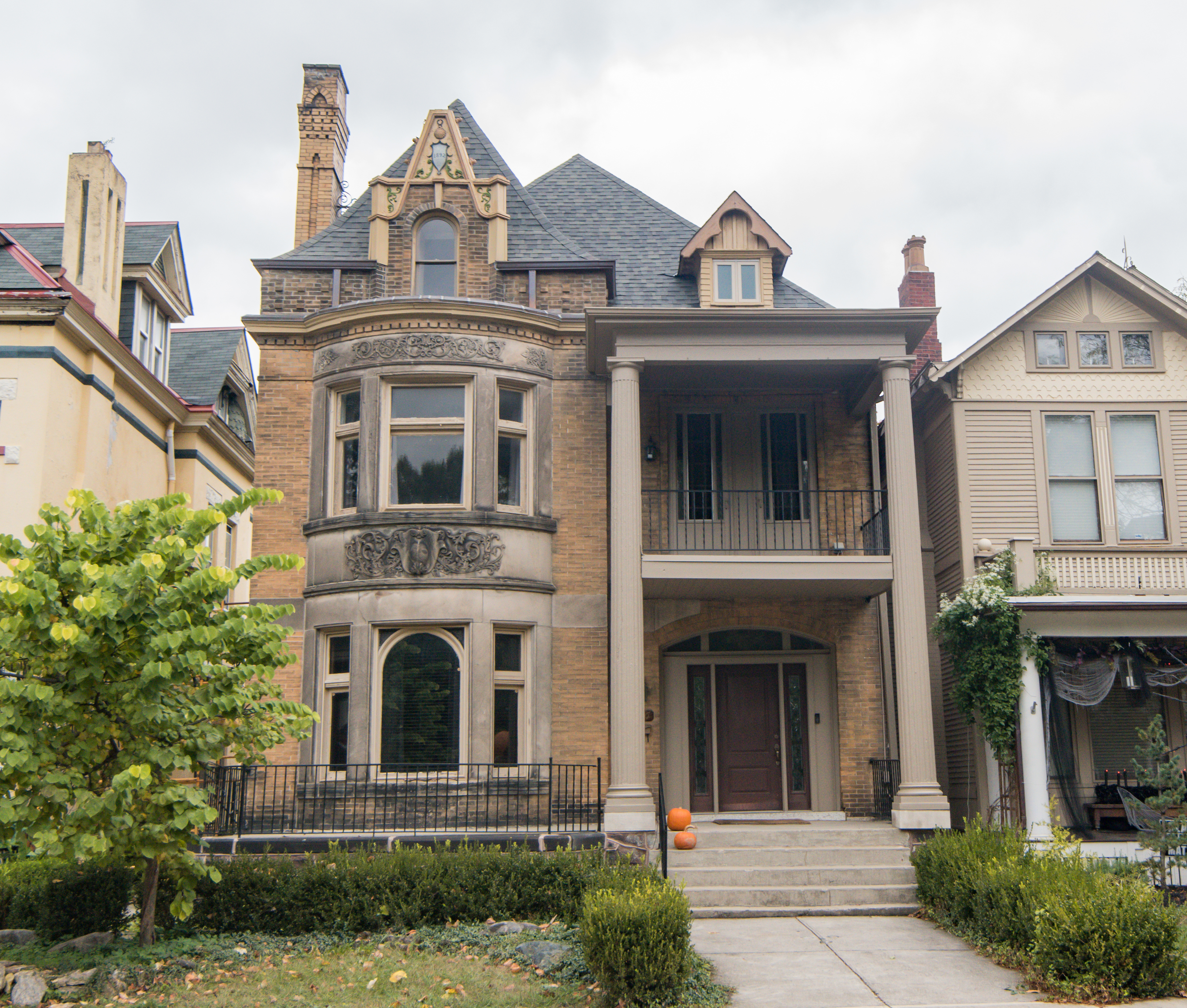
- Location: 1216 Bryden Road, Columbus, Ohio
- Coordinates: 39.960630°N 82.967348°W
- Built: c. 1895
- Architect: Joseph Warren Yost
- Part of: Columbus Near East Side District; Bryden Road District

The Joseph Warren Yost House is a historic house in Columbus, Ohio. It was added to the Columbus Near East Side District (part of the National Register of Historic Places) in 1978, and the Bryden Road District (part of the Columbus Register of Historic Properties) in 1990.

The house was built c. 1895 for Joseph Warren Yost, a prominent Columbus architect, who also designed the house. The building has rich decorations and detail, including a combination of stone, brick, and terracotta, as well as French-inspired bellcast roofs.

The home's design has numerous similarities to the Charles Frederick Myers house, situated on Bryden a few blocks to the east, and presumably also designed by Yost.

== See also ==
- National Register of Historic Places listings in Columbus, Ohio
