= Columbus Public Health =

Health department of Columbus, Ohio

Department overview
- Formed: 1833
- Jurisdiction: Columbus and Worthington, Ohio
- Department executives: Dr. Mysheika W. Roberts, Health Commissioner; Michael J. Fielding, Assistant Health Commissioner
- Website: www.columbus.gov/publichealth/
- Ohio Asylum for the Blind
- U.S. National Register of Historic Places
- U.S. Historic district – Contributing property
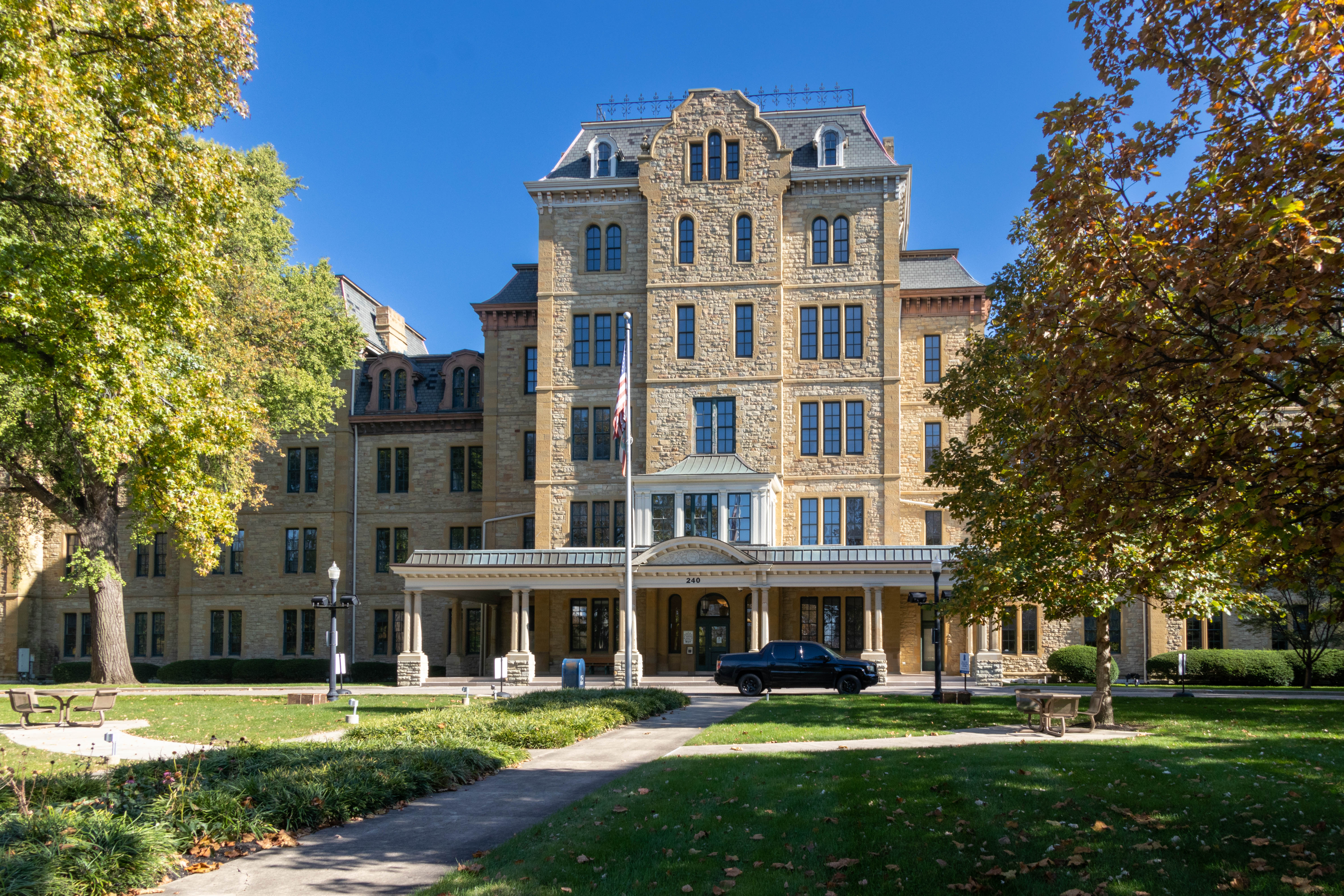
- Interactive map highlighting the main building's location
- Location: 240 Parsons Avenue, Columbus, Ohio
- Coordinates: 39.959313°N 82.980719°W
- Part of: Columbus Near East Side District
- NRHP reference No.: 73001436
- Added to NRHP: July 26, 1973

Columbus Public Health is the health department of Columbus, Ohio. The department is accredited by the Public Health Accreditation Board. The department dates to 1833, when the city's mayor appointed five citizens to help with its cholera outbreak. It became a permanent body to activate whenever health emergencies arose.

Columbus Public Health is headquartered at 240 Parsons Avenue, a large building completed in 1874 for the Ohio Asylum for the Blind. The building and its campus were listed on the National Register of Historic Places in 1973, and as part of the Columbus Near East Side District in 1978.

== Campus ==
The office for Columbus Public Health is at 240 Parsons Avenue, in Olde Towne East and near Downtown Columbus. The main building was built as the Ohio Asylum for the Blind, and was constructed from 1869 to 1874, a long period due to an irregular scarcity of construction workers. It was built in response to a growing population and overcrowding at the institution's original building, built in 1838. The school for the blind remained at the site until the early 1950s, when it moved to a new location in Columbus. The Ohio Department of Highway Safety then took over the building. It later was turned over to Columbus Public Health, which still operates in the building today.

The building was individually listed on the National Register of Historic Places in 1973, and added to the new Columbus Near East Side District in 1978. It was also at one time considered part of the East Town Street Historical District, severed from the area by I-71.

The campus has numerous smaller structures, including a large parking garage and two former dormitory buildings. The North and South Dormitories were constructed in 1935 to house students in the blind school. The north building held boys, while the south held girls, and each held 132 students and four matrons. The Jacobethan Revival buildings were designed by John Schooley Sr. The south dormitory building was proposed for demolition in September 2021, to make room for a surface-level parking lot. Funding was removed for the demolition project in November, after a unanimous Columbus City Council vote. In 2022, the building was listed as one of nine endangered buildings, in an annual Columbus Landmarks publication.

== Gallery ==
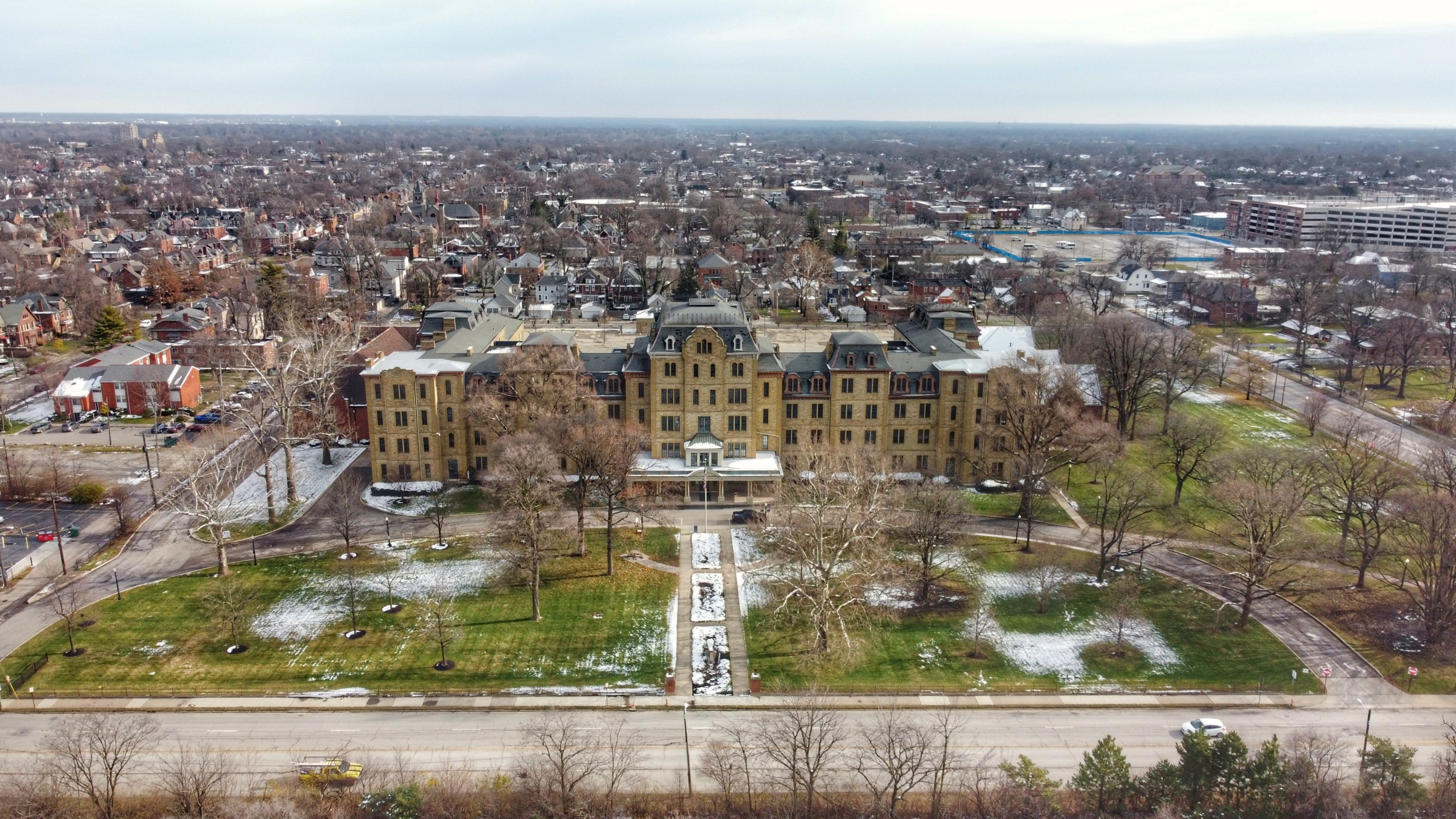
Main building and grounds

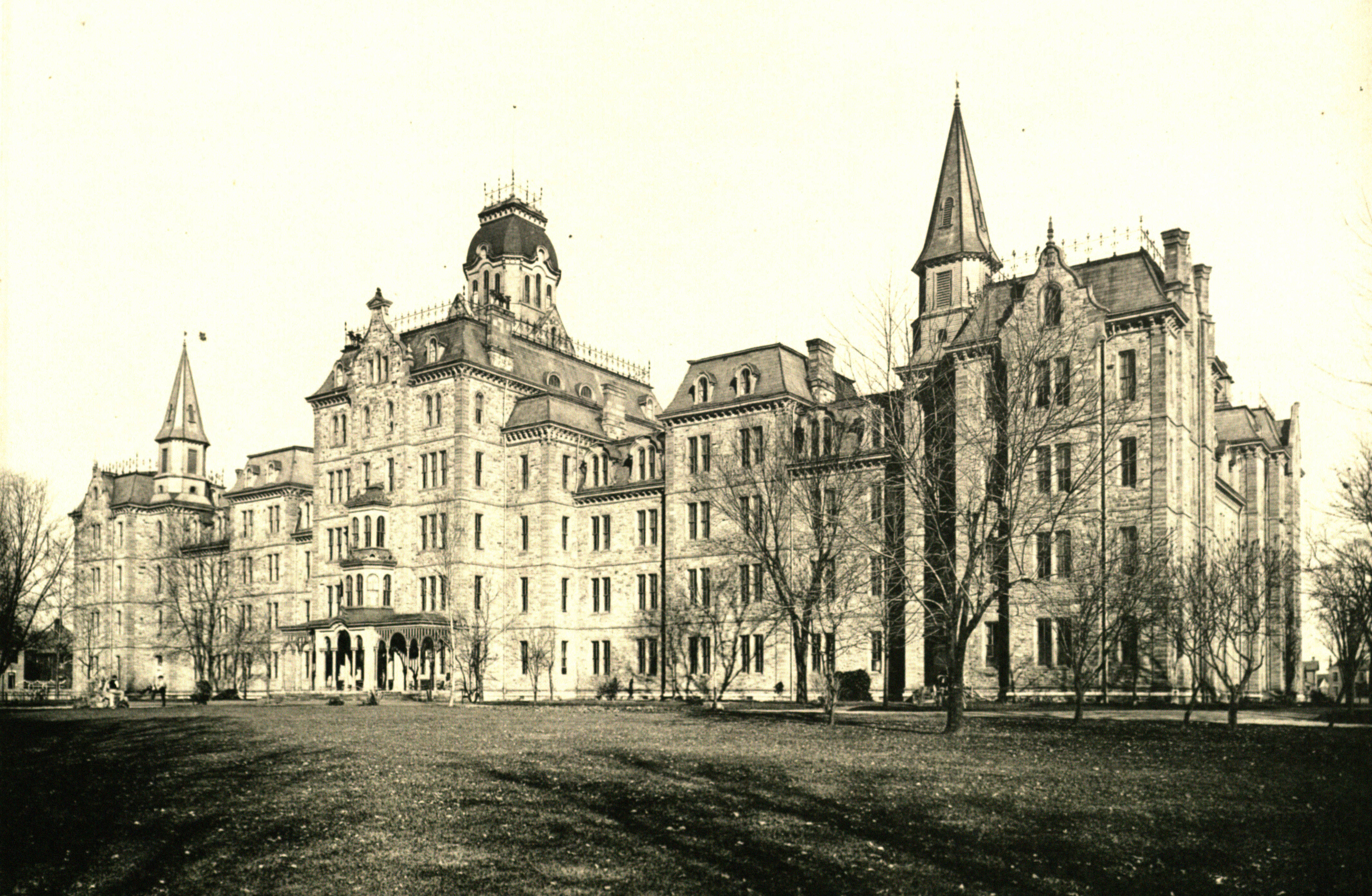
The main building in 1899

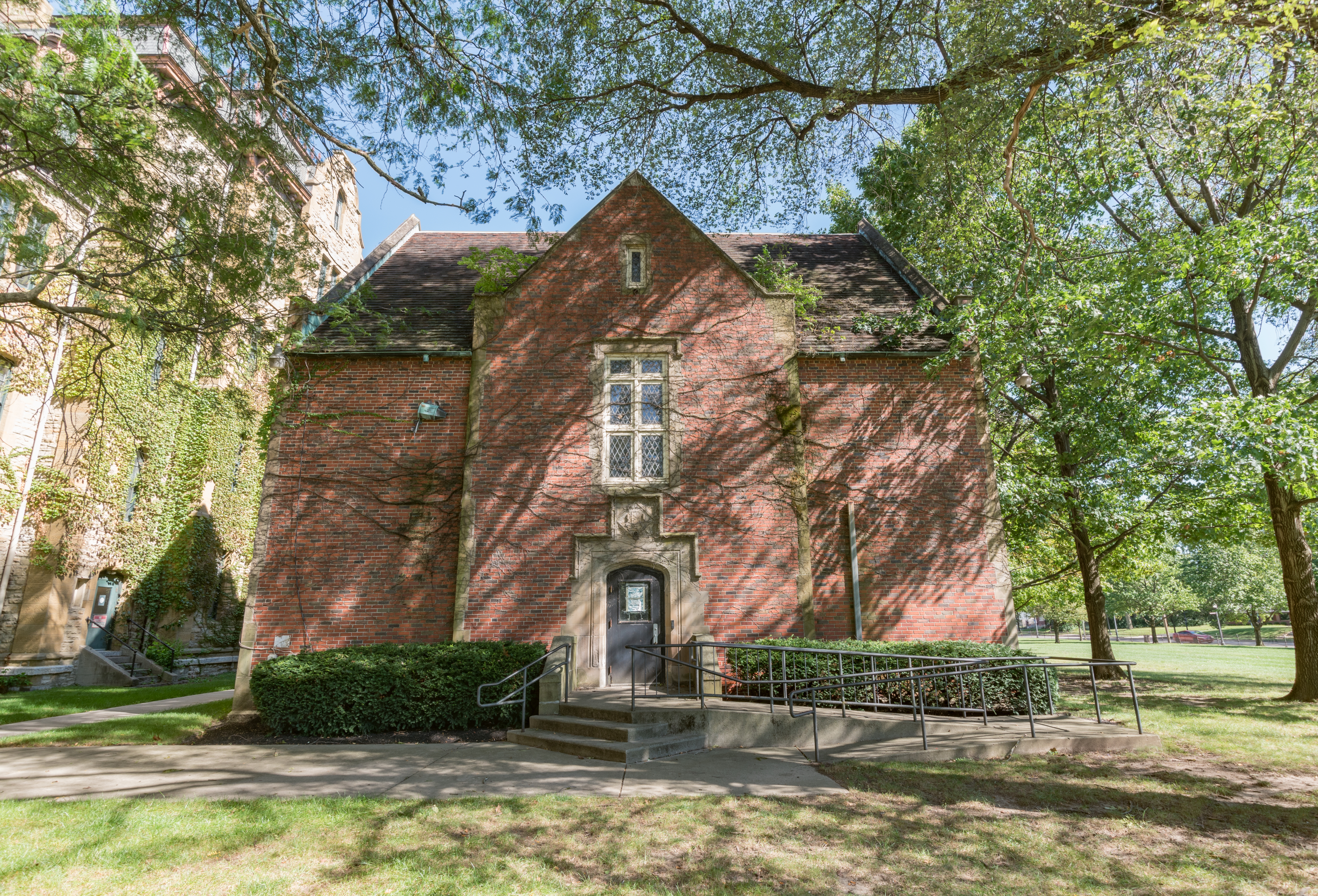
South Dormitory

== See also ==
- Government of Columbus, Ohio
- National Register of Historic Places listings in Columbus, Ohio
