= Albert D'Oench =

American architect

Albert F. D'Oench
- Born: December 25, 1852
- Died: July 20, 1918 (aged 65); Manhasset, New York
- Education: Washington University
- Occupation: Architect
- Spouse: Alice Grace Holloway (m. 1901)
- Practice: D'Oench and Simon; D'Oench & Yost
- Buildings: Sandusky Carnegie Library, W New York Union Square

Albert F. D'Oench (December 25, 1852 – July 20, 1918) was an architect of office buildings and Superintendent of Buildings in New York City. During his career, he had two partnerships, first D'Oench and Simon with Bernhard Simon. Later in his career, he partnered with Joseph W. Yost to form D'Oench & Yost, which designed large office buildings and insurance company buildings.

== Early life and education ==
Albert Frederick D'Oench was born on December 25, 1852, in St. Louis, Missouri. He was one of six children of Marie (née Braasch) D'Oench and William D'Oench (died 1908), a German-born pharmacist. He was the proprietor of D'Oench, Rives & Co. In 1872, D'Oench received his Masters of Engineering degree from Washington University in St. Louis. He then studied in Stuttgart, Germany, graduating from the Institute of Technology.

== Career ==
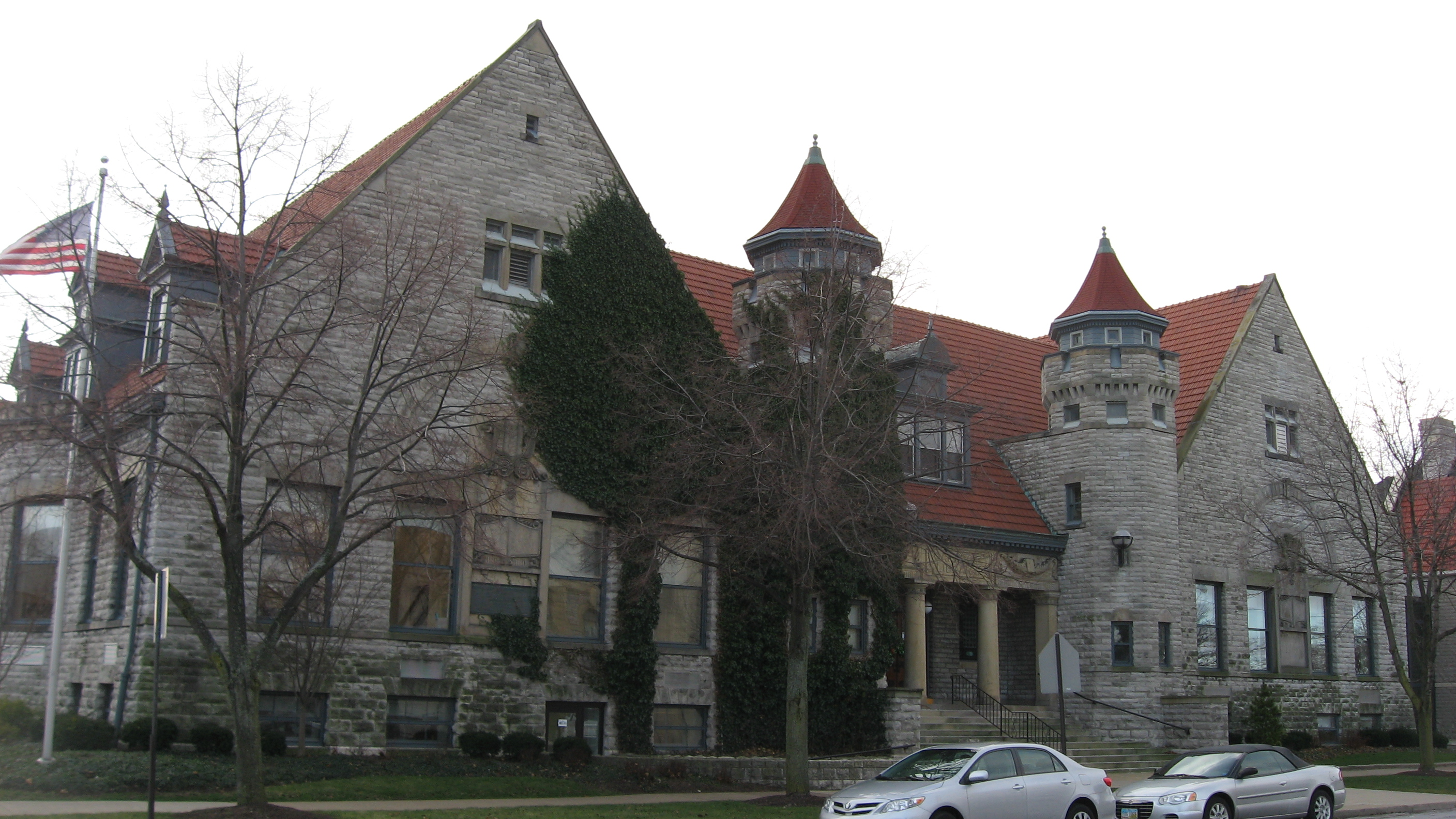
Carnegie Library in Sandusky, Ohio (1901)

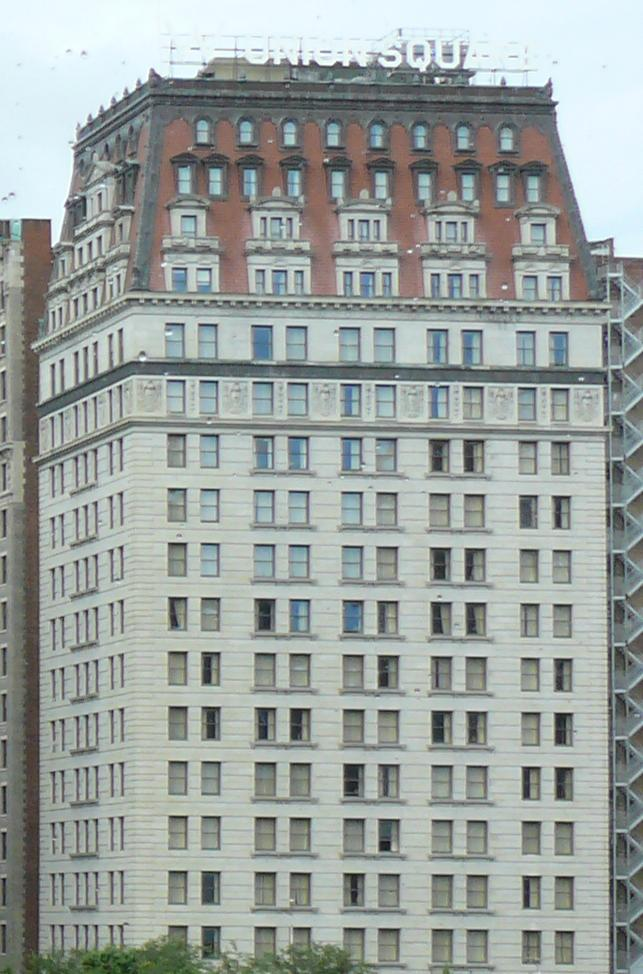
W New York Union Square, New York City (1910)

D'Oench began work as an architect in 1876. He designed office buildings, including several insurance company buildings. According to author Cecil D. Elliott, "Albert F. D'Oench [was] among the architects most favored by New York's many prosperous German businessmen." From 1885 to 1889, he was the Superintendent of Buildings in New York City. He was a member and chairman of the Board of Examiners from 1900 to 1902.

D'Oench was a partner with Bernhard Simon in the firm of D'Oench and Simon. In 1898, the firm designed a large Renaissance Revival-style limestone in the now Crown Heights North Historic District. D'Oench partnered with Joseph W. Yost to form the firm of D'Oench & Yost. The firm worked on designs for the Carnegie Library in Sandusky, Ohio (1901); W New York Union Square (formerly Germania/Guardian Life Insurance Company Building, 1910); the William R. Grace Company building addition; and Richard Morris Hunt's New York Tribune Building. The Carnegie Library and the W New York Union Square are on the National Register of Historic Places.

== Personal life ==
In January 1901, D'Oench married Alice Grace Holloway, whose father, William Russell Grace, was the founder of W. R. Grace and Company and a mayor of New York City. They had a son, Russell Gilchrist D'Oench. His wife was previously married to William I. Holloway, with whom she had a son, William Grace Holloway.

D'Oench had homes in Manhattan and Manhasset. He died at his country house in Manhasset on July 20, 1918.
