= Guernsey County Courthouse =

Local government building in the United States

- U.S. National Register of Historic Places
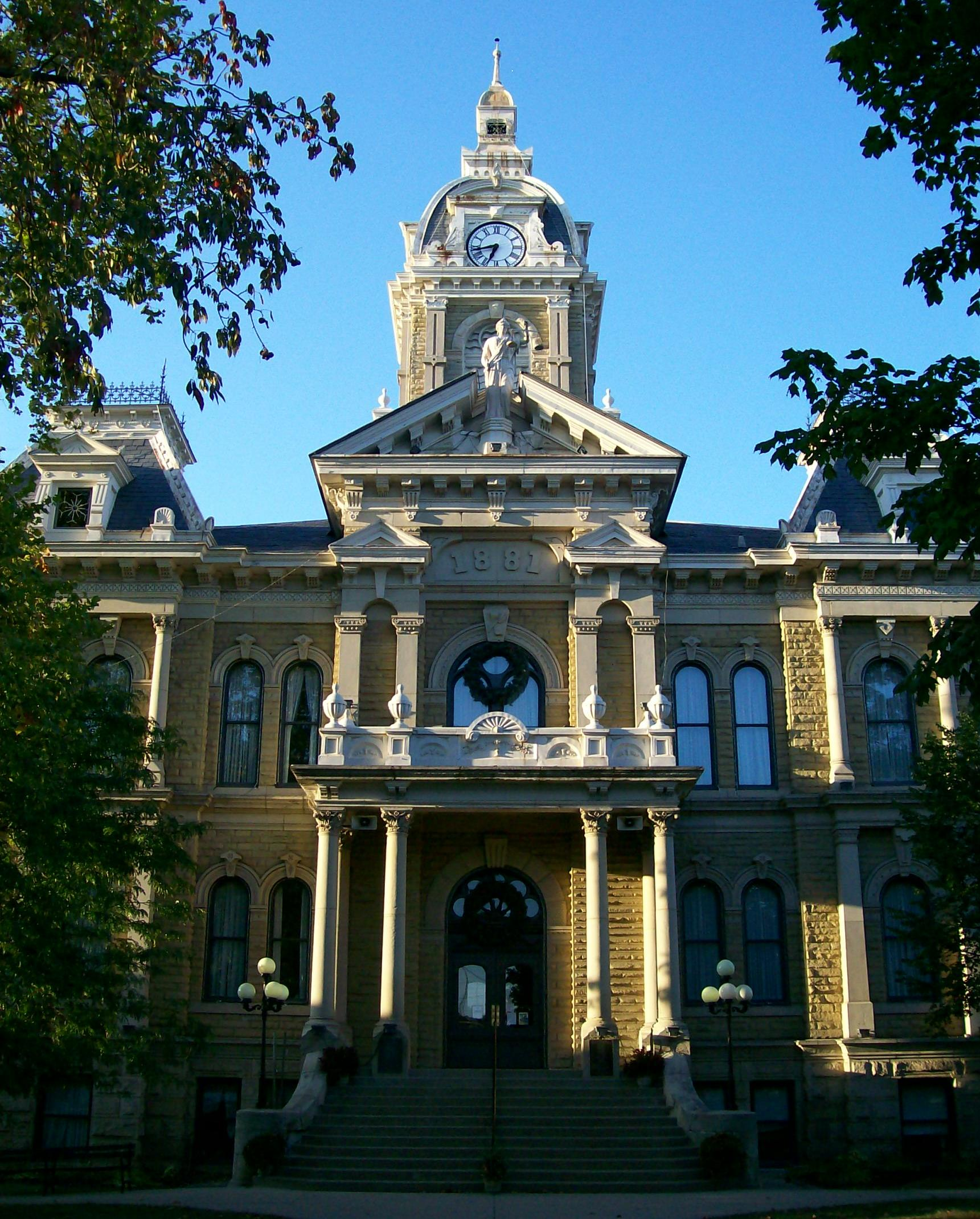
- The courthouse in Cambridge, Ohio
- Interactive map of Guernsey County Courthouse
- Location: Courthouse Sq., Cambridge, Ohio
- Coordinates: 40.025375°N 81.589940°W
- Area: 1.5 acres (0.61 ha)
- Built: 1881
- Architect: Yost, J.W.; Townsend, T.B.
- Architectural style: Second Empire
- NRHP reference No.: 73001452
- Added to NRHP: July 16, 1973

The Guernsey County Courthouse is located on U.S. Route 40 in Cambridge, Ohio. The property was listed on the National Register of Historic Places in 1973.

== History ==
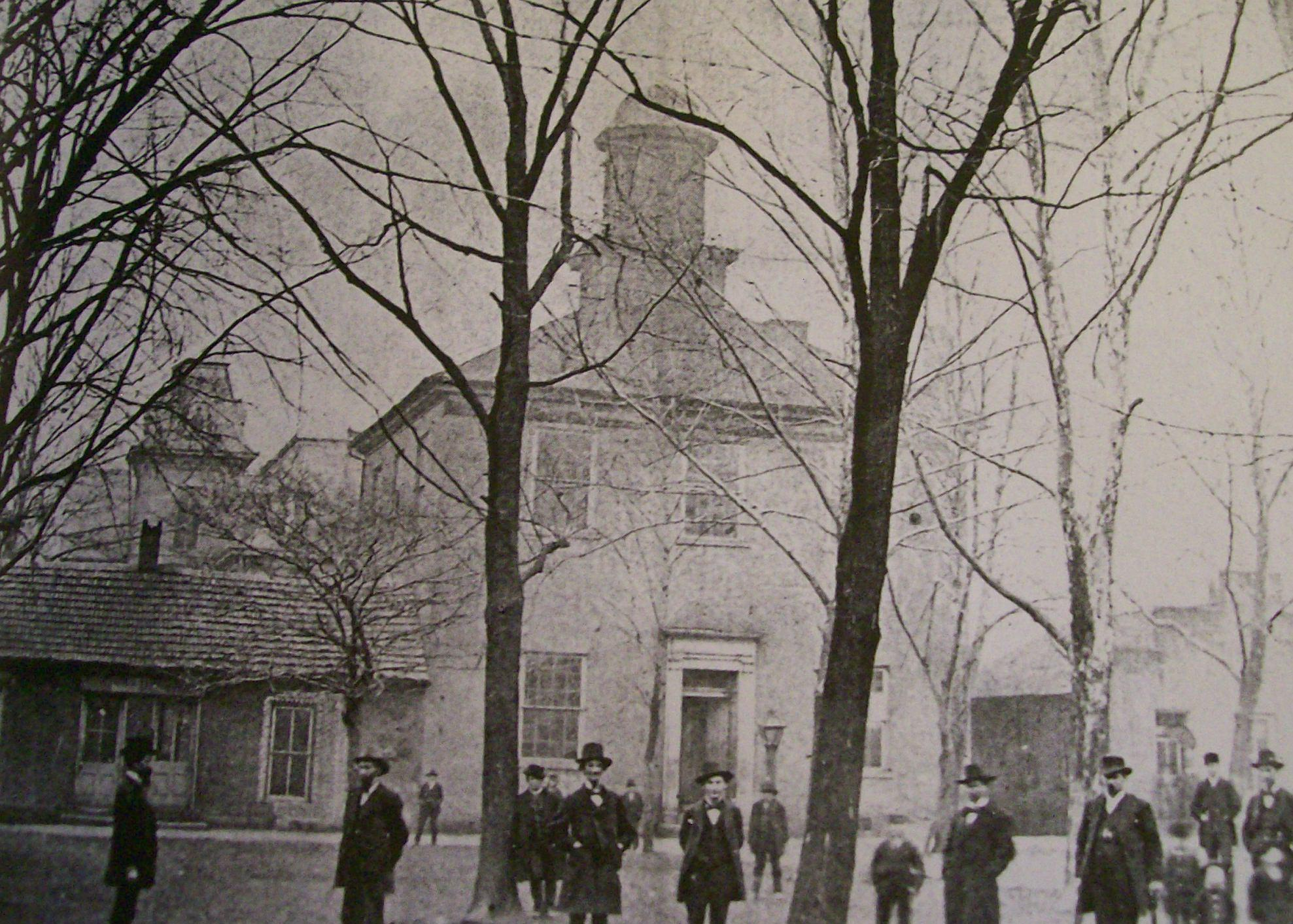
The old Guernsey County courthouse.

Guernsey County was formed in 1810 and the county constructed its courthouse on Public Square in Cambridge. The courthouse was a Greek Revival style building with red brick facade. Two large double doors were located at the north and south ends and long rectangular windows with dark shutters lined the sides. A large spire stood eighty-seven feet tall with a cupola capped by a weathervane shaped like a fish. This courthouse lasted for seventy more years.

Need for a second courthouse became apparent as the county grew in population. The city of Cambridge contracted Joseph W. Yost to design and build the new courthouse. Yost designed the courthouse in the popular Second Empire style. During this time, Old Washington petitioned to be granted the county seat claiming that they were more central. This petition failed and the foundation to the second courthouse was laid in 1881, with the cornerstone bearing the date August 4, 1881. The building was dedicated on 1883-09-11.

== Exterior ==
The exterior is of fine sandstone block with a hipped roof and mansard-roofed towers. Stairs lead to main entrance and is covered by a small balcony. A statue of Justice stands in the broken pediment on the southern face, below the statue is a fan shaped stone bearing the date 1881. A central tower rises from the center of the building and houses a four faced clock and consists of louvered arch openings.

The courthouse is surrounded by various memorials to soldiers from the county in the American Civil War, World War I, World War II, Korean War, Vietnam War, and Operation Desert Storm. The most prominent is the Civil War Monument.
