= Miami County Courthouse (Ohio) =

Historic building in Troy, Ohio, United States

- Miami County Courthouse and Power Station
- U.S. National Register of Historic Places
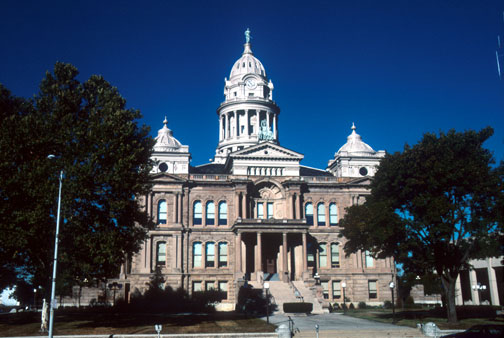
- Taken May 2000

- Location within Ohio Location within the United States
- Interactive map showing the location of Miami County Courthouse
- Location: Troy, Ohio
- Coordinates: 40°2′27″N 84°12′18″W
- Built: 1885-1888
- Architect: Joseph W. Yost; Builder:T.B. Townsend
- Architectural style: Beaux Arts
- NRHP reference No.: 75001490
- Added to NRHP: May 30, 1975

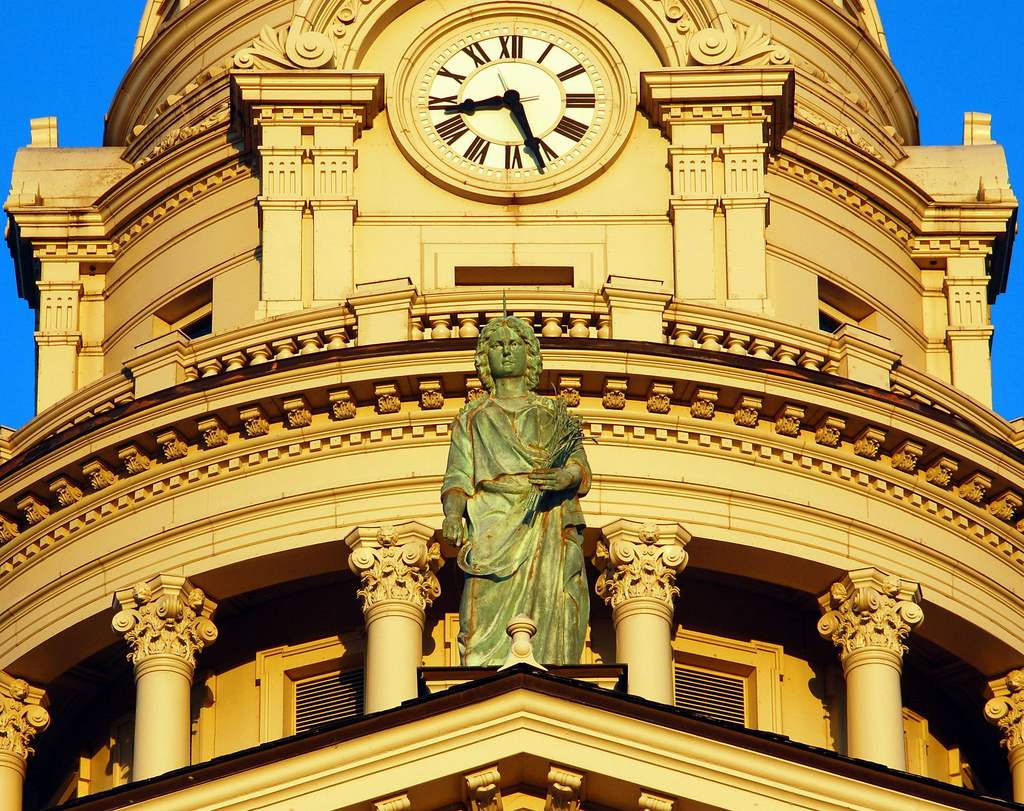
Detail of the western clock face and the statue representing agriculture

The Miami County Courthouse is an historic building in Troy, Ohio, United States. Built from 1885 to 1888, it was designed by noted Ohio (and later New York) architect Joseph W. Yost, who also designed the similar Belmont County Courthouse built at the same time in St. Clairsville. It has high arched windows and Corinthian columns supporting the outthrust corners and main entrance. A flight of stairs runs to the main entrance. The central pediment rests on an arch supported by Corinthian columns. The corners of the building thrust out and support a pediment, on top of each rests a tower crowned with an urn-shaped finial. A central tower rises from the middle of the building supporting the clock tower and dome, and a statue of justice stands at the very top.

On May 30, 1975, the courthouse along with the power station to the north were added to the National Register of Historic Places as the Miami County Courthouse and Power Station.

== See also ==
- Belmont County Courthouse
- Joseph W. Yost
