= Sunset Hill (Manhasset, New York) =

Coordinates: 40°48′8″N 73°41′32″W

- Interactive map of the Sunset Hill area
- Alternative names: D'Oench Estate

General information
- Status: Demolished
- Location: Flower Hill and Plandome, New York
- Construction started: 1905
- Completed: 1906
- Demolished: 1937

Design and construction
- Architect: Albert D'Oench

Sunset Hill (also known as the D'Oench Estate) was a former Gold Coast estate located in Flower Hill and Plandome, on Long Island, in New York.

== History ==
=== The mansion ===
Architect Albert F. D'Oench and his wife, Alice Grace D'Oench (the daughter of William R. Grace) purchased this land in 1905; they purchased the land from the O'Connor estate, which included a farm (also called Sunset Hill). They erected a mansion shortly after, which Albert designed. The estate was called Sunset Hill, due to its high elevation atop a hill and how its location provided for excellent views of the sunset during the summer and autumn months; furthermore, the mansion faced the west. The hill on which the mansion was located reaches elevations high enough for the skyline of New York City to be seen.

When built, the mansion was regarded as one of the Manhasset area's most spacious.

In 1918, Abert D'Oench died at Sunset Hill after suffering from an illness. Alice D'Oench would continue to live at Sunset Hill until her death in 1935 (which also occurred at the home after she fell ill).

=== Development after the mansion ===
Following the death of Alice Grace D'Oench, the land was sold, and much of the estate was ultimately developed. The house was demolished, and residential subdivisions took its place. These residential subdivisions are the D'Oench Estate subdivision, which was developed by the Mott Brothers starting in 1938, and the Sunset Hills subdivision, which was started in 1935 and built over parts of the D'Oench and Mason estates.

When building the D'Oench Estate residential subdivision, Harold Mott noted that it was the most important development project the firm had undertaken at the time, citing its location.

== See also ==
- Chanticlare – another former Gold Coast estate in Flower Hill.
- Harbor Hill
