= Belmont County Courthouse =

Local government building in the United States

- U.S. Historic district – Contributing property
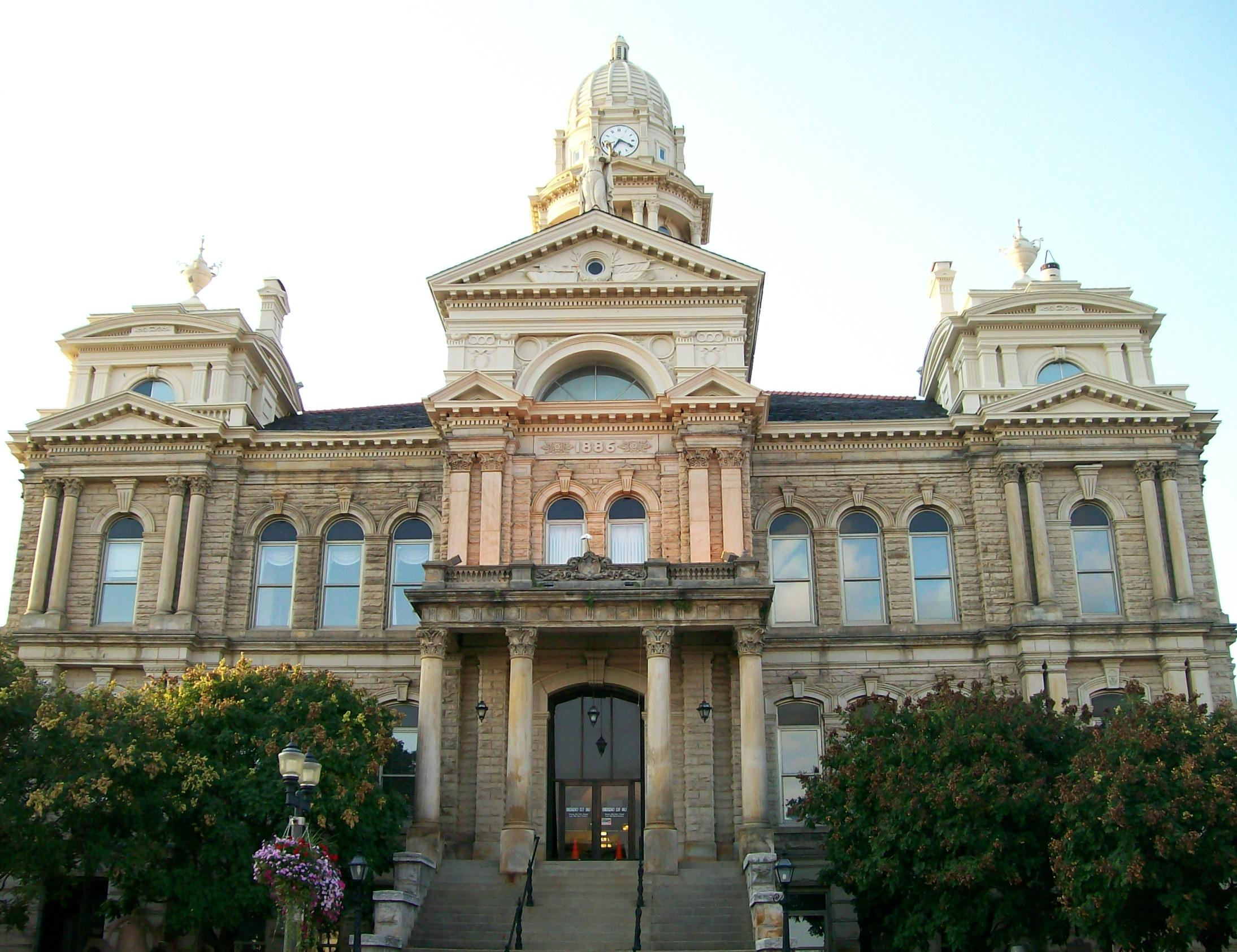
- The Belmont County Courthouse in St. Clairsville, Ohio

- Location within Ohio Location within the United States
- Interactive map showing the location of Belmont County Courthouse
- Location: E. and W. Main St. between Butler and Sugar Sts., St. Clairsville, Ohio
- Coordinates: 40°4′50″N 80°54′6″W
- Built: 1885
- Architect: Yost, Joseph Warren
- Architectural style: Second Empire
- Part of: St. Clairsville Historic District (ID94000246)
- Added to NRHP: March 17, 1994

The Belmont County Courthouse is located at 101 West Main Street in St. Clairsville, Ohio, United States. It sits on the highest point in the St. Clairsville area and is thus visible from Interstate 70 and many other points in the Ohio Valley. It is a contributing property in the St. Clairsville Historic District, which was added to the National Register of Historic Places in 1969.

== History ==
Belmont County was created in September 1801, and organized in November of the same year. The county seat was originally a town called Pultney, where Shadyside is today. This courthouse was a simple two-story brick building, and was only used for a few years until the county seat was moved to St. Clairsville.

St. Clairsville was a developing community along Zane's Trace and the courthouse was planned along this road. The courthouse constructed in 1805 was a log structure standing two stories high. It cost the county just over $1,000. When this building was destroyed, a new courthouse rose from its site. This new building was made of brick in the popular Federal style in 1815. The new courthouse stood two stories high and had long rectangular windows lining the facade. A cupola rose from the pitched roof. This courthouse served the county until 1885.

The new courthouse built between 1885 and 1888 was designed by noted Ohio (and later New York) architect, Joseph W. Yost, who also designed the similar Miami County Courthouse built at the same time in Troy as well as six other Ohio courthouses. The three-floor Second Empire building hosts many county functions. It contains three courtrooms, the county commission meeting room, and offices for county officials.

== Exterior ==
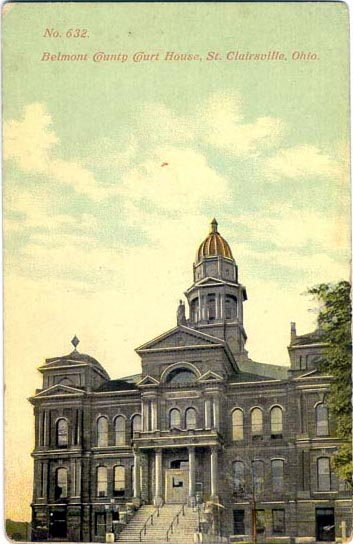
The courthouse in 1891

=== The courthouse ===
The three-story building is constructed of rusticated sandstone blocks with high arched windows. The building is rectangular with a central projection housing the entrance. The stairs once led to the main entrance, but due to security measures the building is now entered through a tunnel under the stairs. Above the stairs is a false balcony supported by Corinthian columns. A pair of arched windows are flanked by a set of Corinthian pilasters supporting a pediment and a frieze bearing the year "1886" in the center with a fanlight above. The central projection is topped with a pediment with a circle light framed by a carved wreath of flags. Standing guard over the entrance is a statue of Justice.

The rest of the facade on either side of the central projection is symmetrical, with three arched windows on each floor and out-thrust corners. The corner projections contain a single arched window with Doric pilasters on the second floor and Corinthian pilasters on the third. The corners are topped by a pediment with a tower which contains Doric pilasters and arched pediments. The top of each tower is crowned with an urn.

A central tower housing a clock tower and dome rises from the mansard roof. The tower contains high arched windows, Corinthian pilasters, and a small lantern. A steel bell weighing 3,800 pounds once hung from the tower but was taken down during restoration and now rests in front of the courthouse. It rang continuously for an hour in 1945 to celebrate the end of World War II.

=== Grounds ===
A memorial stands to the right of the building in honor of the veterans who served in various wars. The courthouse tower bell sits in the northern courtyard and the bicentennial bell sits in the southern courtyard. A brick building to the right used to house local government, but now houses one of many sheriff's posts. The southern portion of the lot consists of a series of stairs with the main landing the site of the local farmers' market in the summer and the public Christmas tree in the winter.

== Interior ==
The interior first floor corridors are lined in tile mosaic forming geometric shapes. The courtrooms and county offices have been refitted with modern conveniences, like an elevator, central air and heating, as well as weather-proof windows. A new metal detector purchased on a state grant protects the many county employees within.

The second floor used to be the main floor and shows evidence of this past. In the atrium is an information desk, staffed during business hours. The deed office is located down the hall.

The third floor contains the since covered dome, now illuminated by surrounding lights. This floor also houses the courtrooms. When the courthouse first opened there were three courtrooms, but the third has since been converted into the county law library.

An attic above cannot be easily accessed and houses the old bell tower and the protruding hump of the dome. The attic has since been turned into file storage for the expanding court records.

== Courthouse annexes ==
There are three courthouse annexes:

- St. Clairsville: 147 West Main Street in St. Clairsville, west of the main complex. This building houses the offices of the prosecuting attorney and the Western Division County Court.
- Bellaire: 400 West 26th Street, Suite 100. This building houses the Eastern and Northern Division County Court.
