= Ohio State School for the Blind =

Public high school in Columbus, Ohio, US

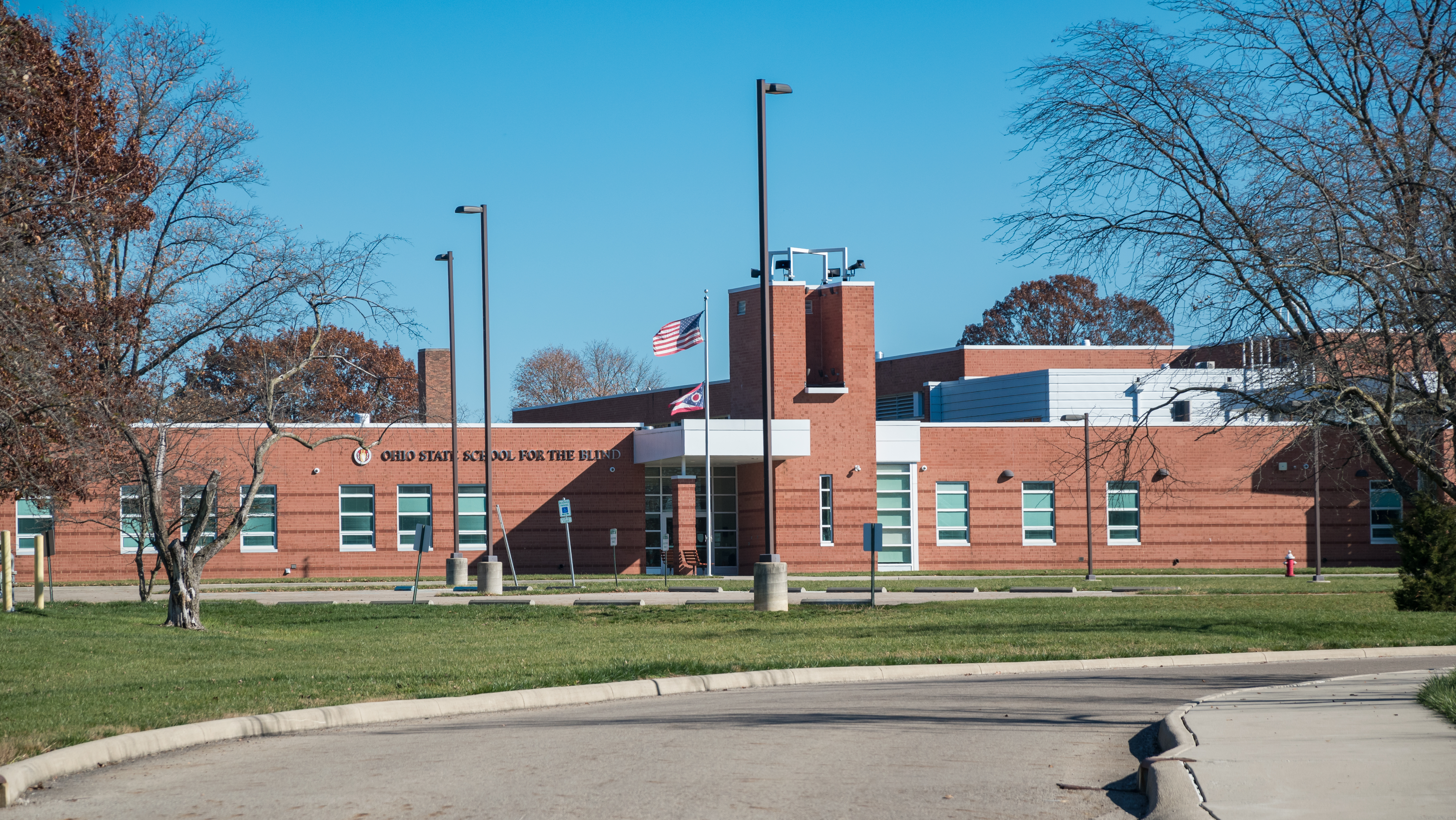

Location
- 5220 North High Street, Columbus, Ohio; 40°4′9″N 83°0′43″W

Information
- Type: Public, Coeducational high school
- Established: 1837; 189 years ago
- Superintendent: Lou Maynus
- Principal: Michelle Wagner-
- Grades: K-12
- Campus type: Residential
- Colors: Red and Blue
- Fight song: Fight The Team Across The Field
- Athletics conference: North Central Association of Schools for the Blind
- Sports: Goalball/Swimming/Track/Cheerleading
- Mascot: Panther
- Nickname: OSSB
- Team name: Panthers
- Accreditation: North Central Association of Colleges and Schools
- Website: www.ossb.oh.gov (defunct)

Ohio State School for the Blind (OSSB or OSB) is a school located in Columbus, Ohio, United States. It is run by the Ohio Department of Education for blind and visually impaired students across Ohio. It was established in 1837, making it the nation's first public school for the visually impaired.

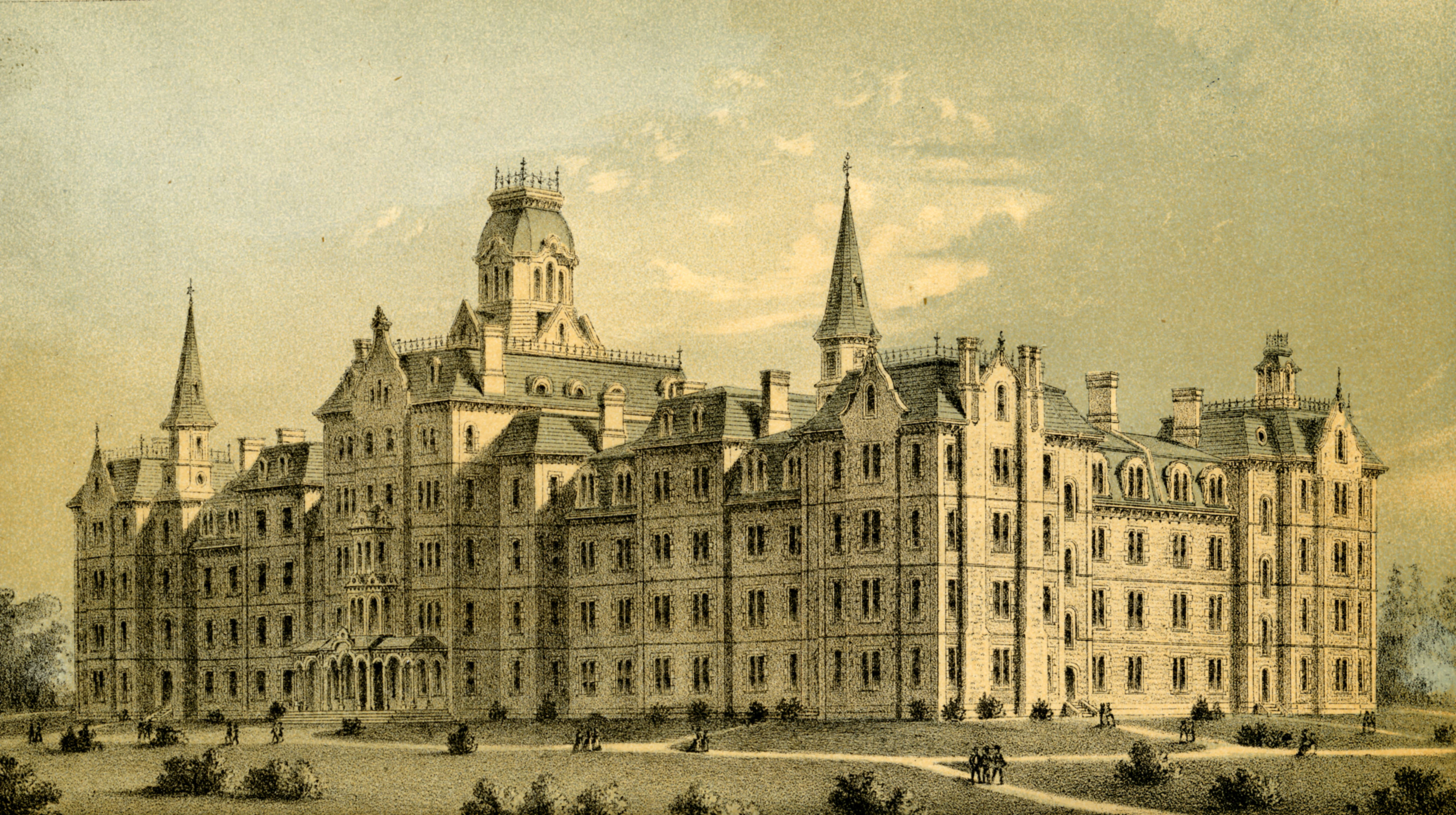
The Ohio Institution for the Education of the Blind at its earlier address, 240 Parsons Avenue in Columbus. This building is now home to Columbus Public Health.

The Ohio Institution for the Education of the Blind building was constructed in 1874 in downtown Columbus on Parsons Ave. Later it became the headquarters for the Ohio State Highway Patrol, and is now home to the Columbus Public Health offices. In the early 1900s, the Ohio Institution for the Education of the Blind became known as the Ohio State School for the Blind. In the mid-1950s the school moved to its current location at 5220 N. High St on the ground of a defaulted golf course. Over its history, the school has seen a vast change in its population and demographics, originally housing a majority of single disability student to now educating students with a variety of abilities.

In the basement of the school sits a vast collection of models that were constructed and purchased over time, of various monuments around the United States that blind students may not be able to see with their eyes but instead could examine with their hands. While the majority of the models were constructed of quality material, there are some that have been neglected and damaged over the years. And have such been repaired and sit in the lobby of the newly built building.

In recent years, a discussion has gained popularity about combining the school with the Ohio School for the Deaf, creating a single state funded school for both blind and deaf students. Camps from both sides have argued both for and against this idea. Opponents say it will destroy each other's way of life. After several months of research, the state of Ohio decided to keep the Ohio State School for the Blind and the Ohio State School for the Deaf each on their own campus. The Ohio State School for the Blind marching band was formed in 2005 to provide music and halftime shows for the Ohio School for the Deaf football program and is the only blind marching band in the country. It is alternatively known as The Best Blind Band In The Land. It is now directed by Yolanda Johnson, assisted by Jeff Schneider. The Ohio State School for the Blind made history on January 1, 2010, when they marched in the 2010 Tournament of Roses Parade in California. The group is the first blind marching band in the event's 121-year history. The marching band was awarded with the National Citation of Excellence from national music fraternity, Phi Mu Alpha Sinfonia

Notable alumni include educator Eleanor Gertrude Brown (class of 1908), who went on to earn a Ph.D. from Columbia University in 1934, jazz legend Rahsaan Roland Kirk and actor/comedian Troy Hammond.

== See also ==
- Kohs block design test
