= Sandusky Library =

Public library system in Erie County, Ohio, US

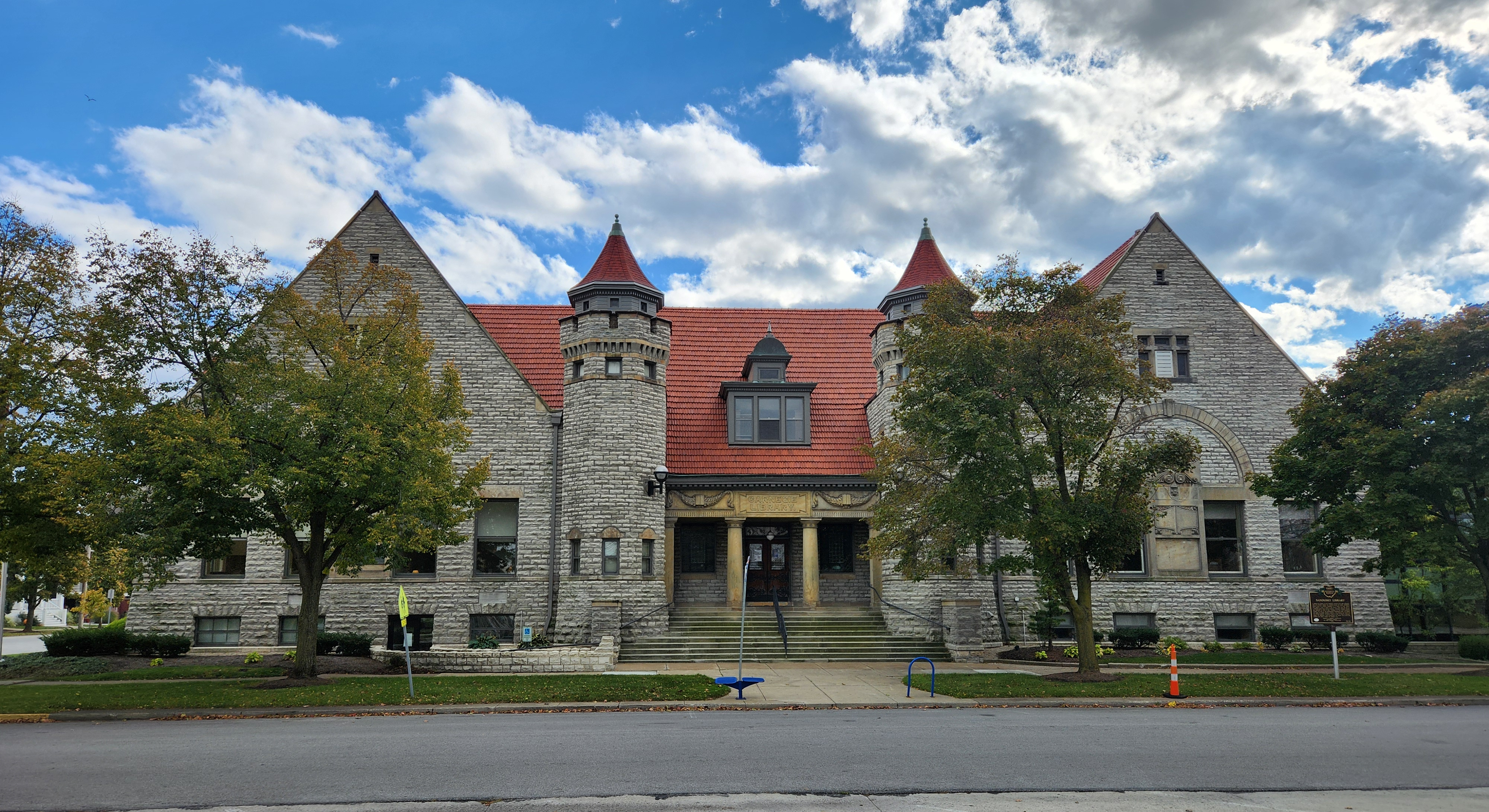
- The Carnegie Library in 2025
- Type: Public library
- Established: 1895; 131 years ago
- Service area: Erie County, Ohio

Other information
- Parent organization: Public Library Association of Sandusky
- Website: sanduskylib.org

The Sandusky Library is the public library system serving Sandusky, Ohio and its surrounding areas in Erie County. Its main branch is the Sandusky Carnegie Library in downtown Sandusky, which was expanded in the early 2000s to incorporate the adjacent Erie County Jail. The Carnegie Library and the historic jail are separately listed on the National Register of Historic Places. The Sandusky Library also operates the historic Follett House Museum in Sandusky and a branch library on Kelleys Island.

== History ==
The city of Sandusky was incorporated in 1824, and the Portland Library Association was formed in 1825. It hired F. D. Parish as its librarian, and established a collection of 300 books. The book collection was transferred multiple times throughout the 19th century, operating as a subscription library. The library had 114 subscribers by 1870, when a group of 12 women organized a new library association and a new reading room opened in the Sandusky High School. The library was opened to the public for free in 1895 when it began receiving property tax funding from the city of Sandusky, and it moved to the city's Masonic Temple in 1896.

A Library Building Funding Association was established in 1886 to raise funds for a library building, and it purchased a parcel of land on Adams Street in 1896. The library association continued to be operated by the prominent women of Sandusky, who organized a series of performances and lectures to benefit the building fund. Frances Moss and her husband Jay O. Moss, a prominent banker in Sandusky, secured a donation from Andrew Carnegie to fund the new building, building on their existing business relationship with Carnegie. The grant of $50,000 ($1.59 million in 2024) was received in October 1899, on the condition that the city provide $3,000 per year to maintain the library. The Carnegie Library opened in July 1901, and has served as the main branch of the library system since.

== Main library ==
- Carnegie Library
- U.S. National Register of Historic Places
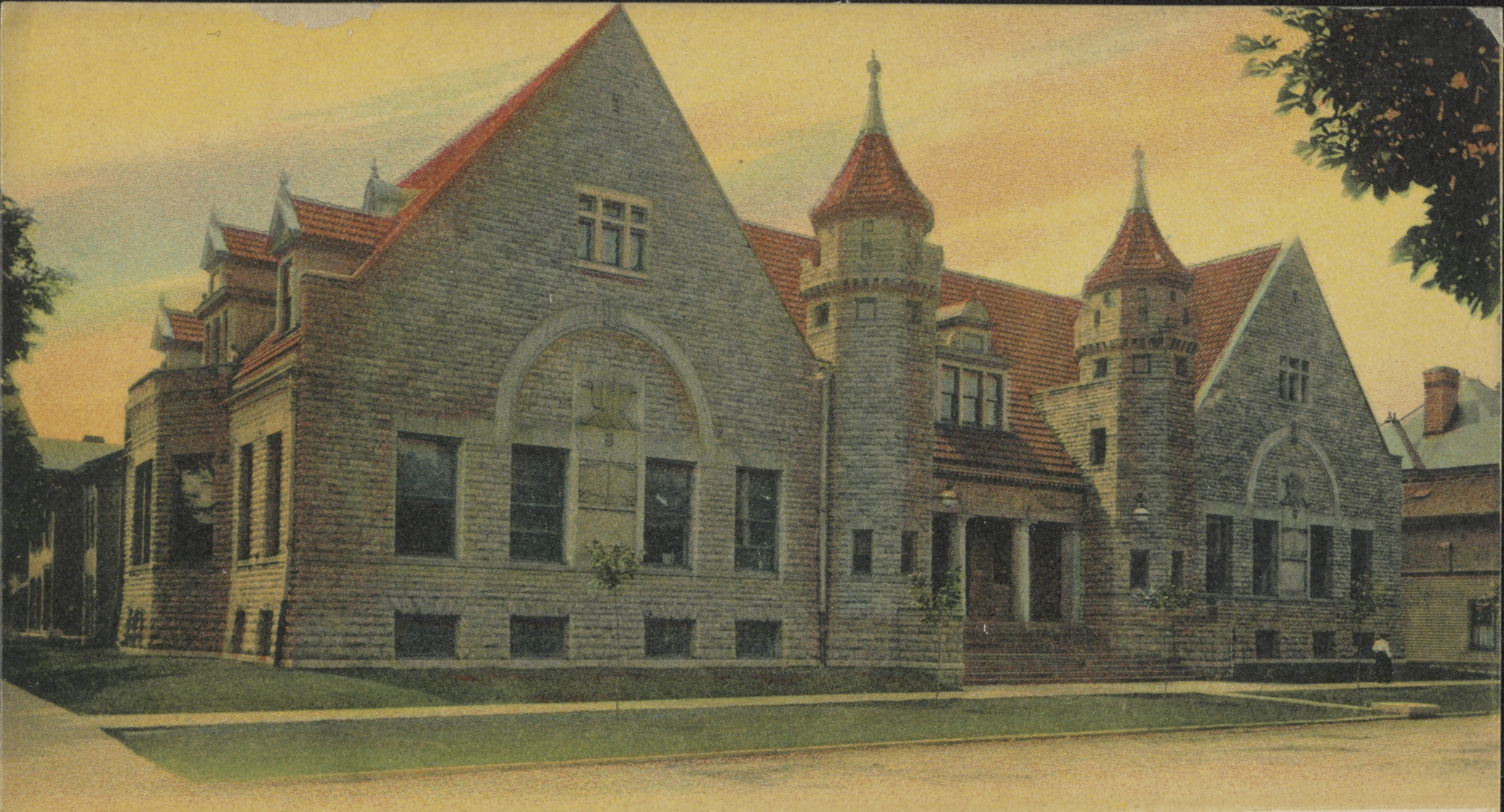
- 1905 postcard of the Carnegie Library
- Interactive map of Carnegie Library
- Location: 114 W. Adams Street; Sandusky, Ohio
- Built: 1901
- Architect: Albert D'Oench and Joseph W. Yost
- Architectural style: Jacobethan Revival
- NRHP reference No.: 75001385
- Added to NRHP: November 12, 1975

The main branch of the Sandusky Library is the Sandusky Carnegie Library, a historic Carnegie library in downtown Sandusky. The Carnegie Library opened in 1901, and was designed by Albert D'Oench. It the third Carnegie library constructed in Ohio, after East Liverpool and Steubenville.

Contracts to build the library were awarded in the summer of 1900, after the receipt of a $50,000 donation from Andrew Carnegie the previous year. The library association engaged Columbus architect Joseph W. Yost to design the building. Yost was in the process of moving his architectural practice to New York City, and he entered into a professional partnership with Albert D'Oench that year. The Sandusky Carnegie library was the first commission for the new firm of D'Oench and Yost, and was planned as a grand two-story structure that would incorporate a library, a museum, and an auditorium.

The architectural style of the library is variously described as Jacobethan Revival or Romanesque Revival; a 1902 Ohio State Library publication described it as "follow[ing] no historical precedents of any definite period." The exterior features steep triangular gables, rectangular windows divided by stone mullions, bay windows, and two towers with curved roofs flanking the main entrance.

The original interior plan featured a reading room in the left wing of the first floor. In the right wing of the first floor, the building included an approximately 400-seat auditorium with a Steinway piano and a pipe organ. The second floor served as a museum, with exhibit space, a kitchen, and an art gallery. Historian Virginia E. McCormick argued in 2001 that the design of the Sandusky library was unlike its contemporaries: many contemporaneous libraries were built in the Classical revival style, and few incorporated as many functions as the Sandusky library did.

The library was dedicated on July 3, 1901, with a gala attended by dignitaries including Governor George K. Nash and Ohio State University president William Oxley Thompson. An addition to the adult services department of the library was constructed in 1968, and the building was listed on the National Register of Historic Places in 1975.

=== Erie County Jail ===
- Erie County Jail
- U.S. National Register of Historic Places
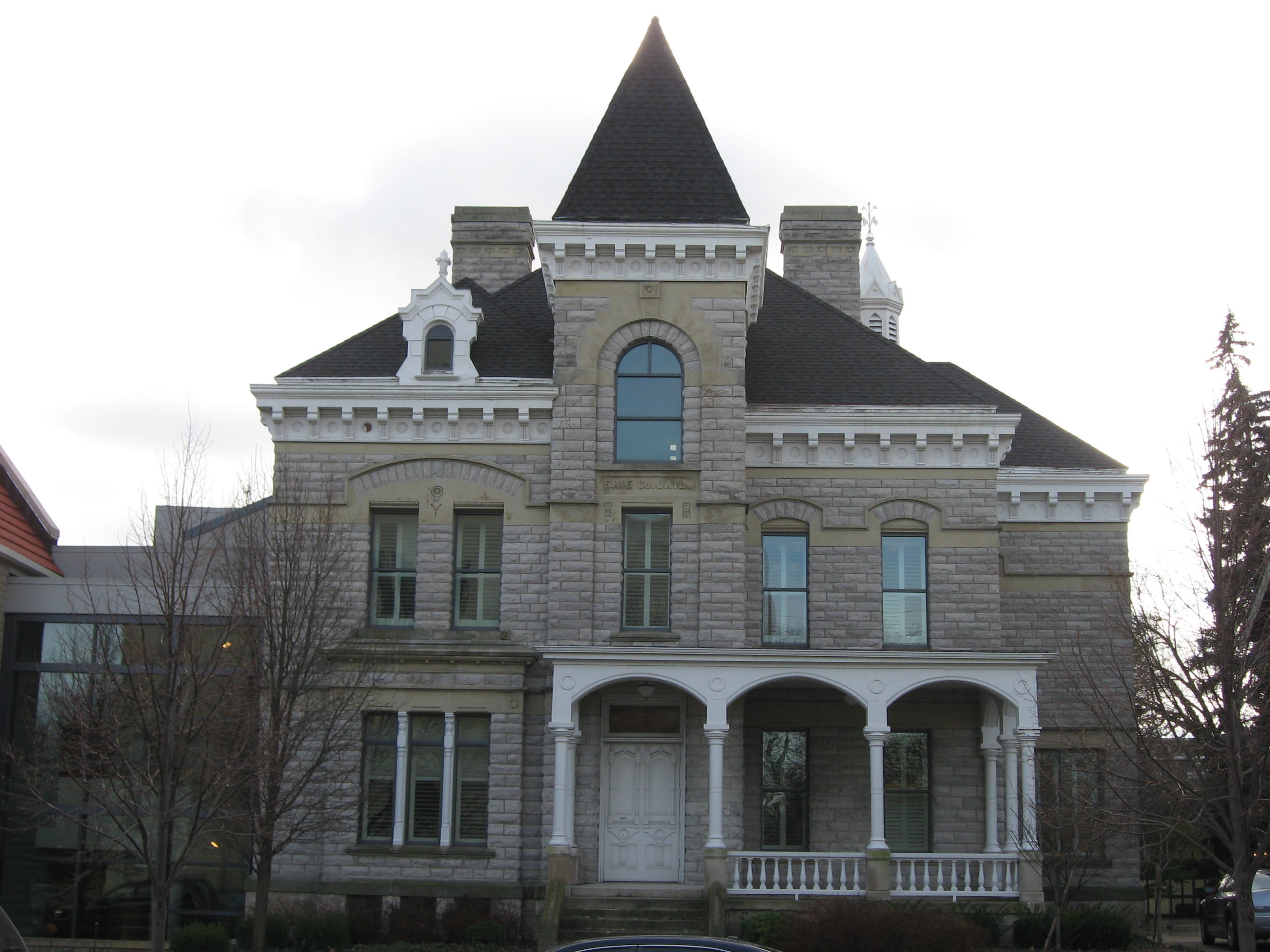
- The jail building in 2012
- Built: 1883
- Built by: Philip, Adam & George Feick
- Architectural style: Stick–Eastlake
- MPS: Sandusky MRA
- NRHP reference No.: 82001395
- Added to NRHP: October 20, 1982

The 2004 expansion of the main library incorporates the Erie County Jail, a historic Stick–Eastlake style building which formerly served as the county jail and the sheriff's official residence. It was built from 1882 to 1883 by the firm of Adam Feick & Brother, which consisted of Adam, Philip, and George Feick. It was listed on the National Register of Historic Places in 1982.

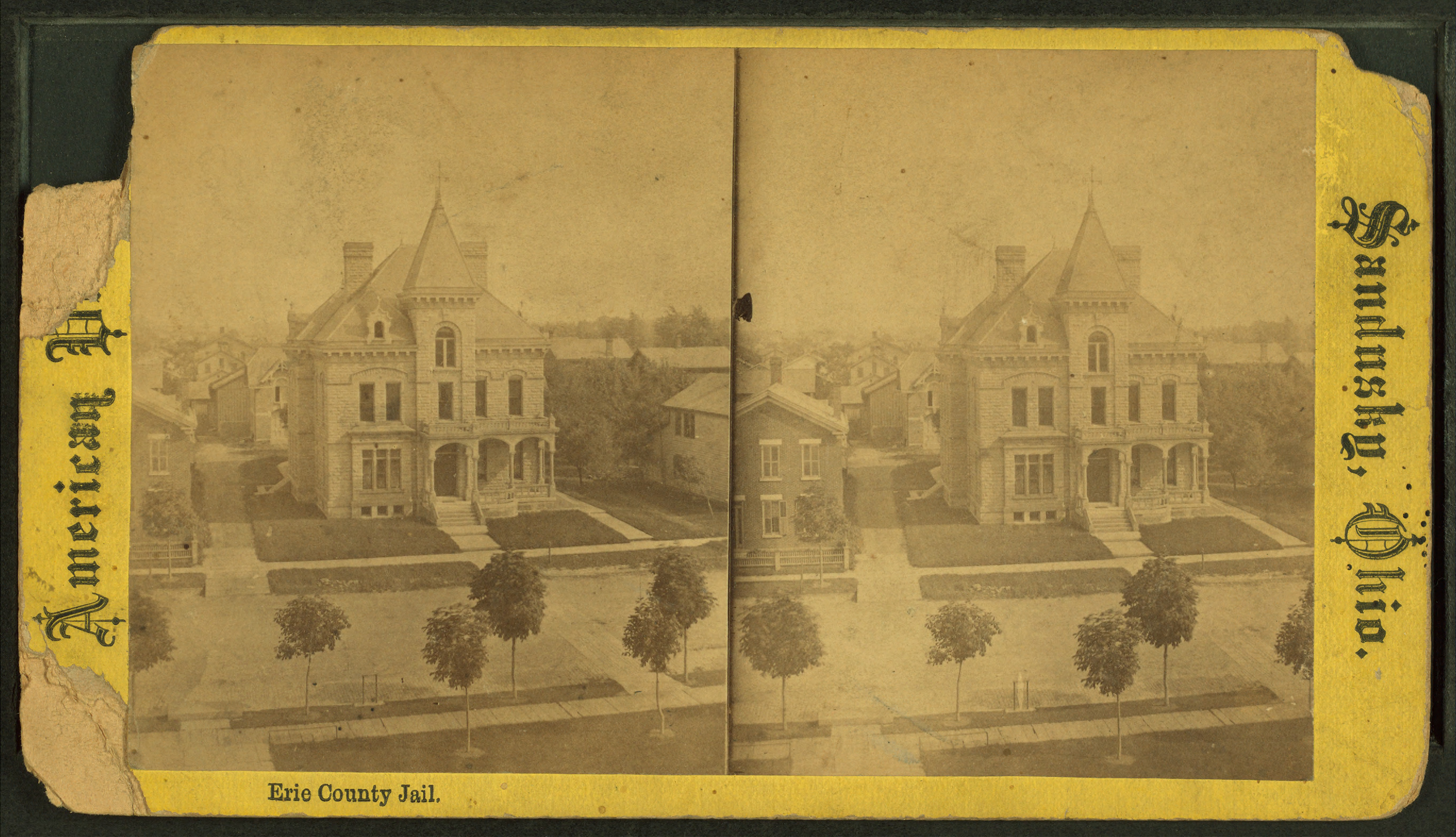
Stereoscopic view of the jail by photographer N.H. Hammond

The Erie County Jail building is a three-story building, designed to serve as both the county jail and the residence of the county sheriff and his family. A 1995 report on a similar county jail found that 52 such buildings were constructed in the 88 counties of Ohio, including 19 in Northwest Ohio. The 1883 jail succeeded multiple previous jail buildings, including a one-room stone structure on Jackson Street nicknamed "Fort Mockabee." The jail is constructed of local limestone, with sandstone banding above windows and floor lines.

The jail is located across the street from the County Courthouse. It was expanded during the 20th century, with a rear addition constructed in the 1960s. It served as the sheriff's residence until 1972. By the 1980s, the Erie County Sheriff's Office was interested in a more modern facility, and it moved to a new facility in Perkins Township in 1990.

A major construction program in the late 1990s connected the former jail to the adjacent Carnegie Library, and the combined library reopened in 2004. Parts of the former sheriff's residence, including the dining room and living room, serve as breakroom space for library staff. As of 2024, the jail cells remain intact, and are not open to the public.

== Kelleys Island branch ==
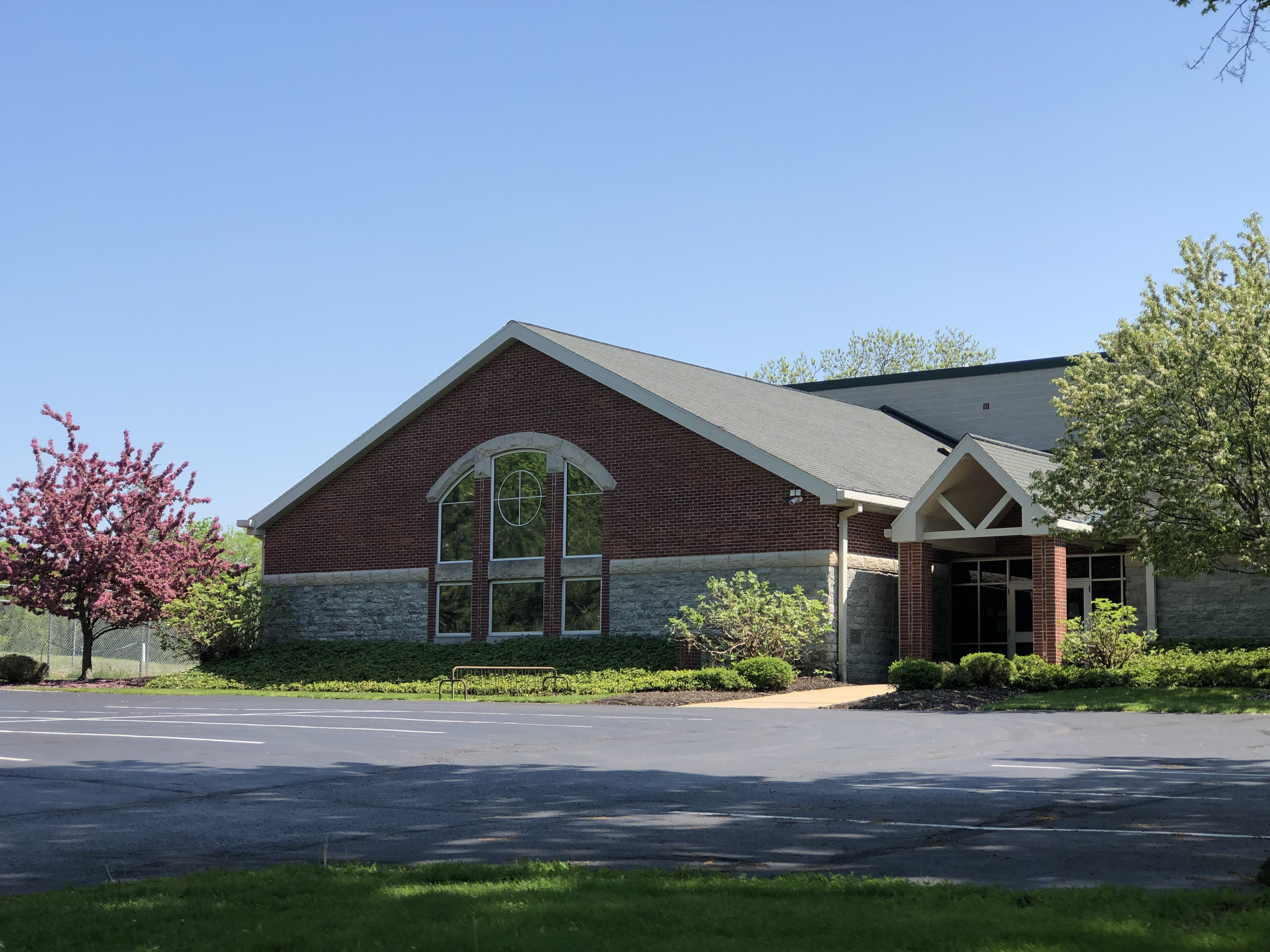
The Kelleys Island branch in 2019

The Kelleys Island branch library traces its history to the establishment of a library association in 1864. Its current building, an annex of the Kelleys Island School, opened in 2000. Day-to-day operations of the branch are staffed by volunteers in the Kelleys Island community, supported by the professional staff of the library system.

== Sandusky History Museum ==
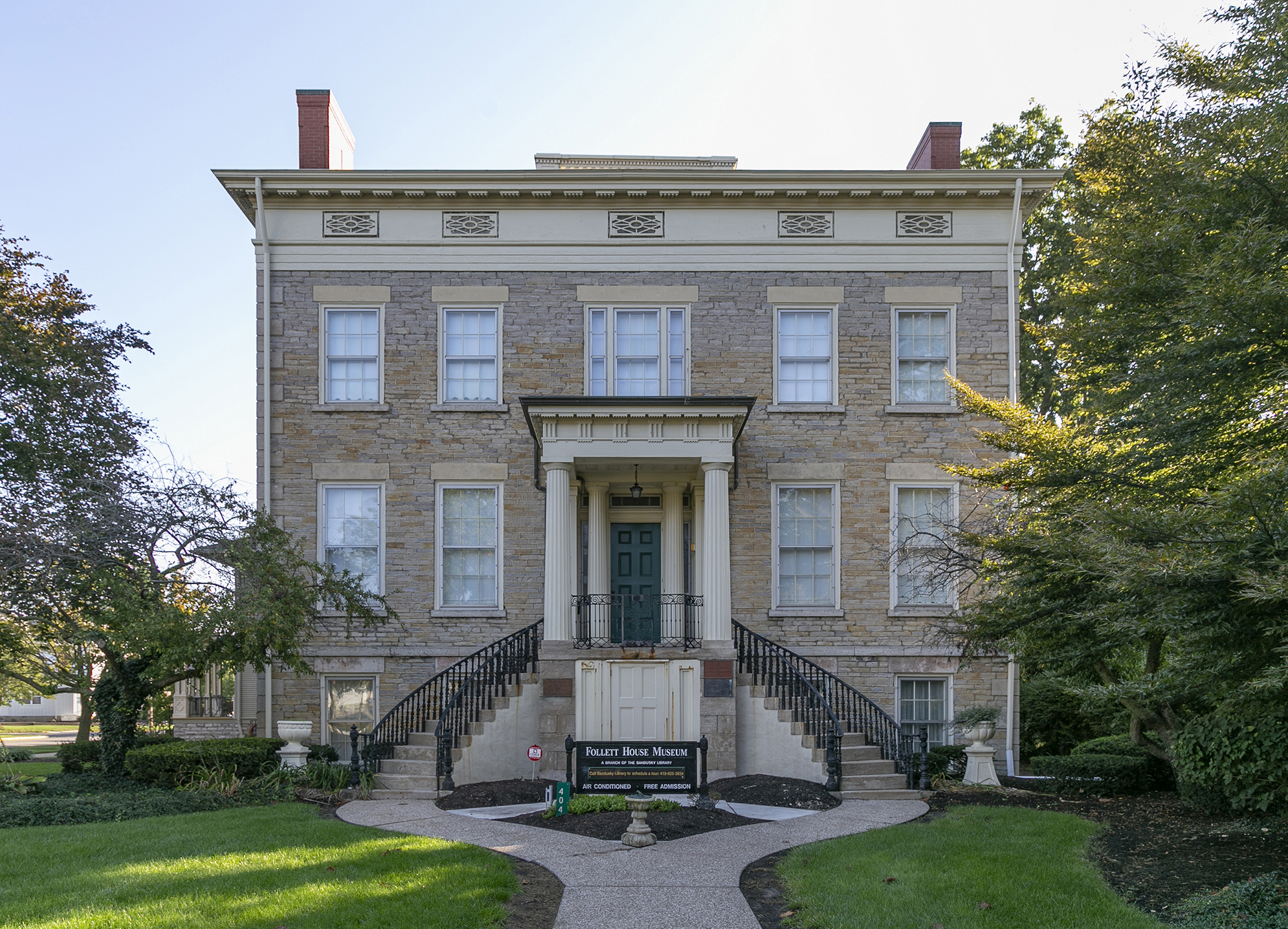
The Follett House Museum in 2021

The Sandusky History Museum is located in the former residence of publisher and politician Oran Follett, a sandstone mansion in Sandusky built in the 1830s. It served as a stop on the Underground Railroad, and is currently operated by the Sandusky Library as a local history museum. It was listed on the National Register of Historic Places in 1974, as part of a district that also includes the adjacent residences of Augustus H. Moss and his son Jay O. Moss.

In 2023, the house was listed as a stop on the Ohio Historical Underground Railroad Trail, a collection of properties across Ohio that contributed to the Underground Railroad.

== Services and governance ==
The Sandusky Library is a member of CLEVNET, a library consortium founded by the Cleveland Public Library. CLEVNET provides shared services such as an online public access catalog, ebook access, and interlibrary loans for over 40 libraries in northern Ohio. The Sandusky Library has been a member of CLEVNET since 1984.

The Library Association of Sandusky is a 501(c)(3) nonprofit organization, funded by local and state governments. Local funding is provided by property taxes in the city of Sandusky, Perkins Township, and the village of Kelleys Island. Margaretta Township is also included in the library's service area. Additionally, some library events are funded by the Lange Trust, a trust fund established in the 1970s to support education and culture in Sandusky. The library makes library cards available to all Ohio residents.
