= Harrison County Courthouse (Ohio) =

Local government building in the United States

- U.S. National Register of Historic Places
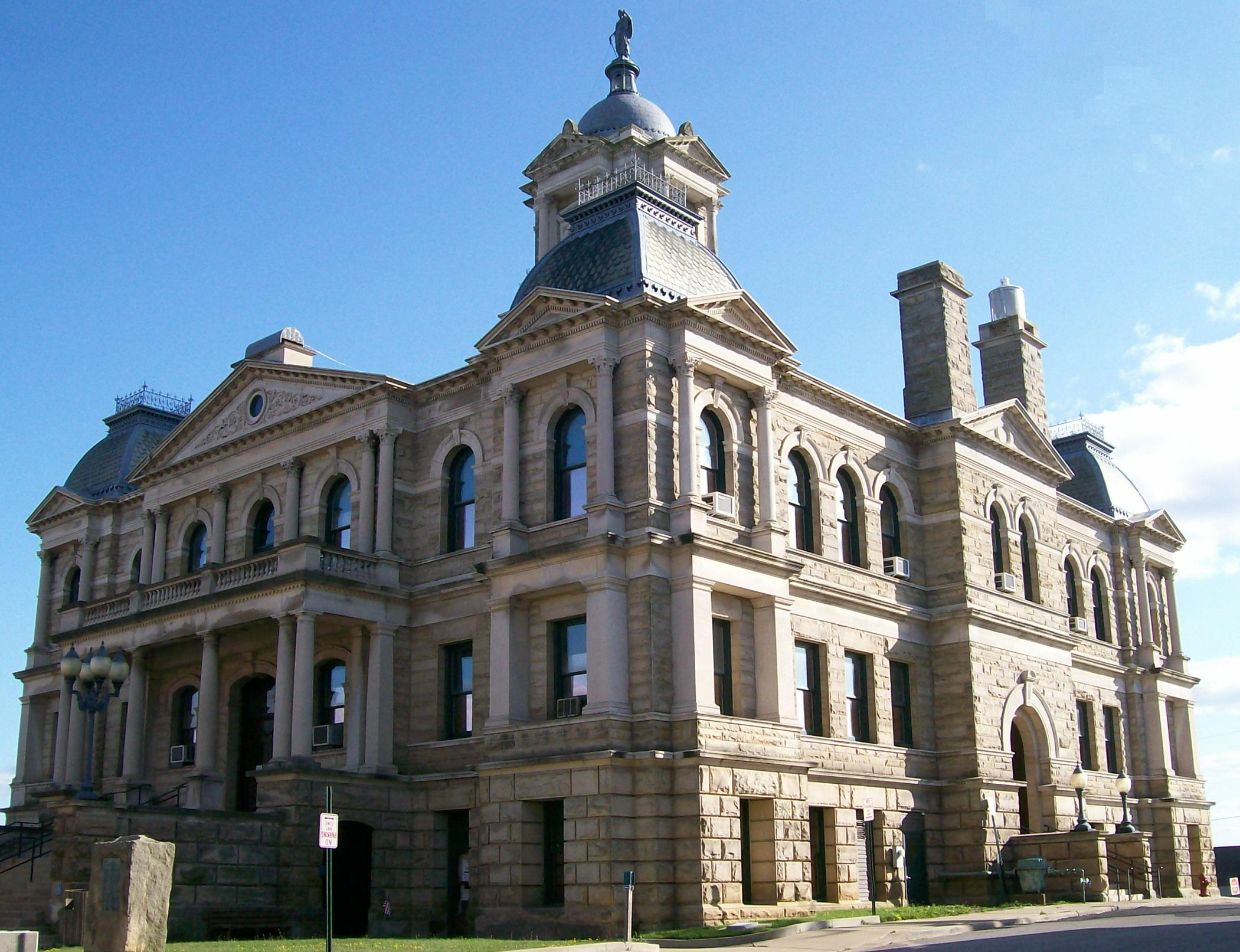
- View from Market Street
- Interactive map of Harrison County Courthouse
- Location: 100 W Market Street, Cadiz, Ohio, United States, 43907
- Coordinates: 40°16′22″N 80°59′53″W
- Built: 1893
- Architect: Yost & Packard; Long, E.M.
- Architectural style: Second Empire
- NRHP reference No.: 74001524
- Added to NRHP: July 18, 1974

The Harrison County Courthouse in Cadiz, Ohio, United States, was constructed during 1893 to 1895 by Joseph W. Yost. The courthouse mirrors others of his design, with large arched windows and a central clock tower domed and topped with a statue of Justice. The porches to the entrances are covered with a balcony. The building's corners are partially separate structures topped with mansard roofs, while post and lintel structures, topped with pediments, are placed on each side of the corner structures. The entire exterior is constructed of stone.

After the building was constructed, a mechanic's lien was filed by the Greer family to prevent the county from taking possession of the property. The issue was finally resolved and the county officials moved in. Like other courthouses, the Harrison County courthouse fell into disrepair. In 1993, the courthouse saw renovations of the premises, including an elevator, replacement of the roof, dome, and stairs, as well as other much needed repairs.
