= Eleanor P. Brown =

American economist (born 1954)

- Born: Eleanor Phyllis Brown; April 18, 1954 (age 71)
- Education: Pomona College (B.A., Economics) Princeton University (M.A., Economics) Princeton University (Ph.D., Economics)
- Occupations: Economist, professor
- Years active: 1986–present
- Employer: Pomona College

Eleanor P. Brown is an American economist. She is the James Irvine Professor of Economics at Pomona College in Claremont, California, and is a co-editor of the academic journal Review of Economics of the Household.

== Early life and education ==
Eleanor Phyllis Brown was born on April 18, 1954. She attended public schools in Fullerton, California before attending Pomona College, graduating in 1975. She then earned a master's degree in 1977 and a doctorate in 1981 from Princeton University.

== Career ==
=== Academic positions ===
After completing her doctorate at Princeton University in 1981, Brown began her academic career as an Assistant Professor and member of the Graduate Faculty at the University of Florida (1981-1985), where she also served as a Provisional Assistant Professor (1980-1981). She then returned to Princeton University as a Visiting Assistant Professor and Lecturer (1985-1986) before joining her alma mater, Pomona College, in 1986 as an Assistant Professor of Economics.

Brown advanced through the academic ranks at Pomona College, serving as Associate Professor (1989-1997) and Professor (1997-1999) before being appointed to the prestigious James Irvine Professorship of Economics in 1999, a position she continues to hold. She also served as Associate Dean of the College at Pomona from 1994-1996 and currently coordinates the Philosophy, Politics, and Economics program.

=== Teaching and pedagogy ===
At Pomona College, Brown teaches a diverse range of courses spanning microeconomics at both undergraduate and graduate levels, including principles of microeconomics, intermediate microeconomic theory, public finance, urban economics, and economics of gender and family. She has also developed specialized courses such as "Freedom, Markets, and Well-Being" as part of the Philosophy, Politics, and Economics curriculum. Beyond traditional academic instruction, she has taught in various summer programs for journalists, incoming high school seniors, and credit union employees, demonstrating her commitment to economic education across diverse audiences.

Brown's excellence in teaching has been consistently recognized through multiple Wig Distinguished Professor Awards for Teaching Excellence at Pomona College, received in 1989, 1994, 1999, 2004, 2009, and 2014. The Wig Award is Pomona College's highest honor for faculty, recognizing exceptional teaching, concern for students, and service to the college and community.

=== Research focus and contributions ===
Brown's research specializes in economic activity outside traditional market transactions, focusing on charitable giving and volunteering, the economics of the nonprofit sector, and the economics of the family. Her work examines how individuals and households make decisions about philanthropic giving, volunteer time allocation, and resource distribution within families. She has made significant contributions to understanding intergenerational transmission of generosity, the role of social capital in charitable behavior, and gender differences in philanthropic decision-making.

Her scholarly output includes numerous peer-reviewed articles in leading economics journals such as the Journal of Public Economics, Journal of Human Resources, and Nonprofit and Voluntary Sector Quarterly. Notable publications include her work on charitable giving by married couples, the relationship between education and philanthropy, and the economic value of volunteer activity.

=== Editorial and professional leadership ===
Brown has played a significant editorial role in academic publishing, serving as co-editor of Economic Inquiry (1991-1995), deputy editor of Nonprofit and Voluntary Sector Quarterly (1998-2010), and co-editor of the Review of Economics of the Household (2012-2022). She continues to serve on the editorial board of Nonprofit and Voluntary Sector Quarterly.

Her leadership extends to professional organizations, where she has held numerous positions. Most notably, she served multiple roles in the Association for the Study of the Grants Economy, including Secretary, conference program chair, and ultimately President (2001-2013). During her presidency, she presided over the organization's strategic rebranding to the Association for the Study of Generosity in Economics, reflecting the evolving focus of the field.

=== Awards and recognition ===
In addition to her multiple teaching awards, Brown received the Best Nonprofit and Voluntary Sector Quarterly Paper Award in 2007 for her article "Social Capital and Philanthropy: An Analysis of the Impact of Social Capital on Individual Giving and Volunteering," co-authored with James Ferris. She has been awarded research grants from prestigious organizations including the Fetzer Institute, John Templeton Foundation, and National Science Foundation.

=== Professional affiliations ===
Brown maintains active memberships in several professional organizations, including the American Economic Association, Association for Research on Nonprofit Organizations and Voluntary Action, Association for the Study of Generosity in Economics, Committee on the Status of Women in the Economics Profession, International Association for Feminist Economics, International Society for Third-Sector Research, and serves on the advisory board of the Society of Economics of the Household, which she helped establish. She is also a member of the Women's Philanthropy Institute advisory board.

== Bibliography ==
=== Books ===
- Brown, Eleanor P., Stiglitz, Joseph E. (1988). Economics of the Public Sector, 2nd edition. W. W. Norton & Company. ISBN 0393956873.
- Brown, Eleanor P., edited with Moore, Robert L. (1995). Readings, Issues, and Problems in Public Finance, 4th edition, Richard D. Irwin.
