= Eleanor Gertrude Brown =

American Milton scholar and educator

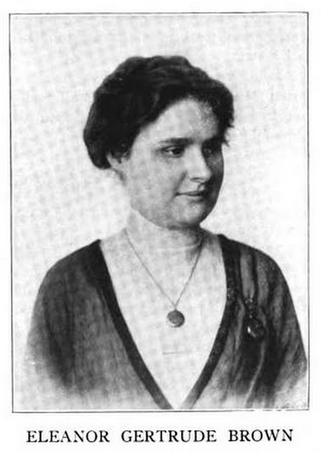
Eleanor Gertrude Brown, from a 1916 publication.

Eleanor Gertrude Brown (August 28, 1887 — July 21, 1964) was an American Milton scholar and educator.

== Early life ==
Eleanor Gertrude Brown was from Dayton, Ohio. She was blind from infancy, and educated at the Ohio State School for the Blind, graduating in the class of 1908. She completed undergraduate studies at Ohio State University in 1914, the school's first blind graduate. She earned a master's degree from Columbia University in 1924, and a doctoral degree from the same institution in 1934.

== Career ==
For forty years, until her retirement in 1952, Brown taught English, German, Latin, and history to sighted students, at Steele High School in Dayton. In 1960, she was honored by the Dayton Federation of Women's Clubs as Outstanding Woman of the Year.

Books by Eleanor Gertrude Brown include Milton's Blindness (1934), a work of literary scholarship based on her doctoral dissertation about John Milton; Into the Light (1946), a book of poetry; and Corridors of Light (1958), a memoir of her own education, with an introduction by Harry Emerson Fosdick. "To my interpretation of Milton's life and writing after the loss of sight, I add my knowledge of blindness," she explained of her scholarship. "By similarity of experience alone, I am rendered a more able critic."

== Personal life ==
Eleanor Gertrude Brown died in 1964, from stomach cancer, aged 76 years. Her Milton's Blindness was reissued by Columbia University Press in 2011, as an important work in Milton studies.
