= St. Clairsville Historic District =

Historic district in Ohio, United States

- U.S. National Register of Historic Places
- U.S. Historic district
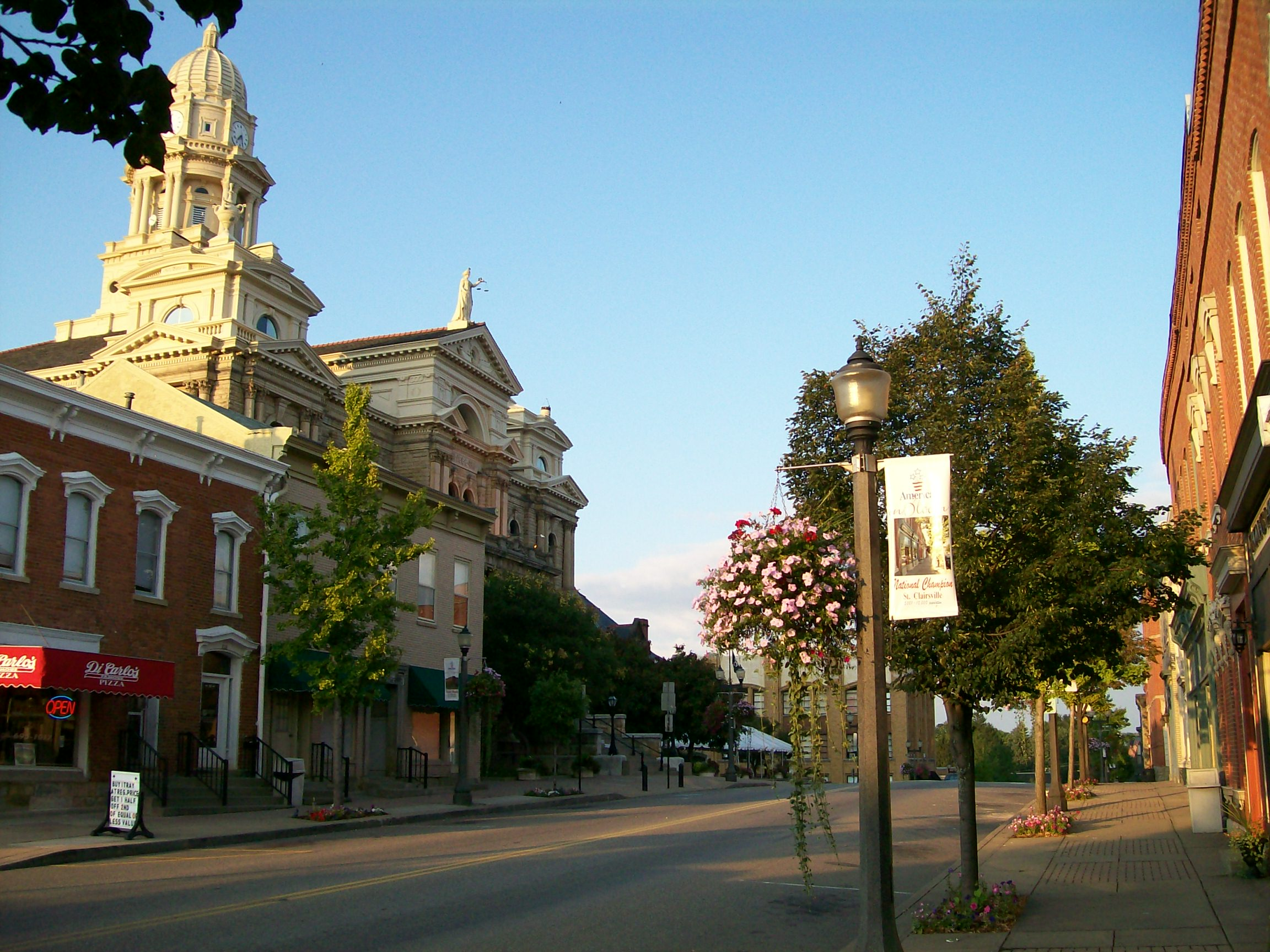
- Downtown St. Clairsville, Ohio with the courthouse on the left.

- Location within Ohio Location within the United States
- Location: E. and W. Main St. between Butler and Sugar Sts., St. Clairsville, Ohio
- Coordinates: 40°4′50″N 80°54′6″W
- Built: Various times
- Architect: Various
- Architectural style: Multiple
- NRHP reference No.: 94000246
- Added to NRHP: March 17, 1994

The St. Clairsville Historic District is located in downtown St. Clairsville, Ohio, United States. The historic district contains buildings built during the Victorian era. The Belmont County Courthouse, St. Clairsville Municipal Building, and the Clarendon Hotel are some of the most notable buildings in the district. The district was placed on the National Register of Historic Places on 1994-03-17.
