= Columbus Near East Side District =

Historic district in Ohio, United States

- U.S. National Register of Historic Places
- U.S. Historic district
- Columbus Register of Historic Properties
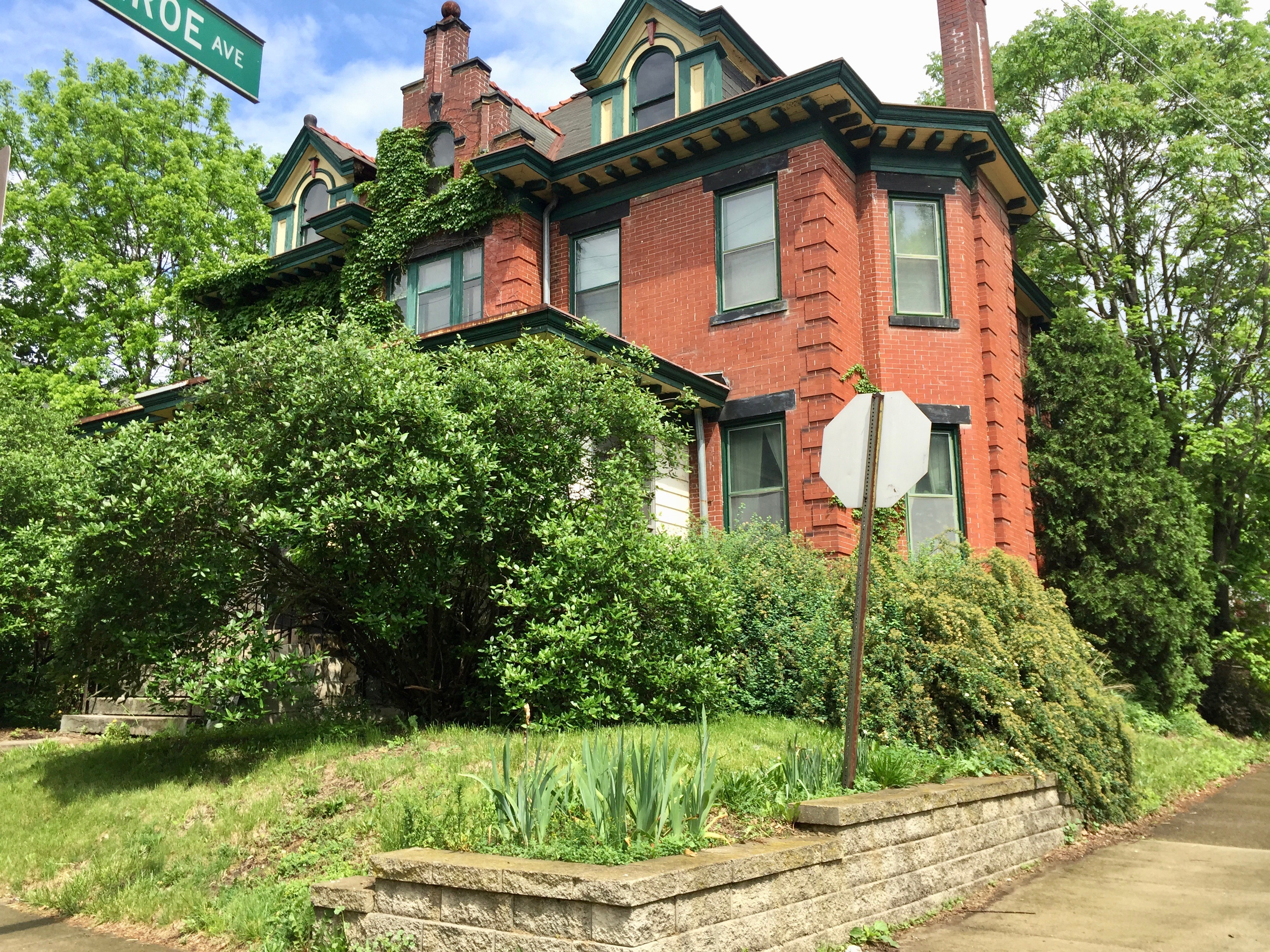
- Contributing building
- Map of the Bryden Road District among other historic sites and districts
- Location: Columbus, Ohio
- Coordinates: 39.963119°N 82.966207°W
- NRHP reference No.: 78002063 (original); 83004287 (increase)
- CRHP No.: CR-44

Significant dates
- Added to NRHP: May 19, 1978
- Boundary increase: December 9, 1983
- Designated CRHP: March 20, 1990

The Columbus Near East Side District is a historic district in the Near East Side of Columbus, Ohio. The site was listed on the National Register of Historic Places in 1978. A portion of the district, the Bryden Road District, was added to the Columbus Register of Historic Properties in 1990. An addition, the Columbus Near East Side Historic District-Parsons Avenue, was added to the register in 1983.

The Columbus Public Health building, the former Engine House No. 12 and Fair Avenue Elementary School, Franklin Park, and the Franklin Park Conservatory all lie within the National Register district. Both historic districts include the Joseph Warren Yost House at 1216 Bryden Road, designed by the prominent architect, as well as the Charles Frederick Myers house.

== See also ==
- National Register of Historic Places listings in Columbus, Ohio
