= 44 Union Square =

Office building in Manhattan, New York

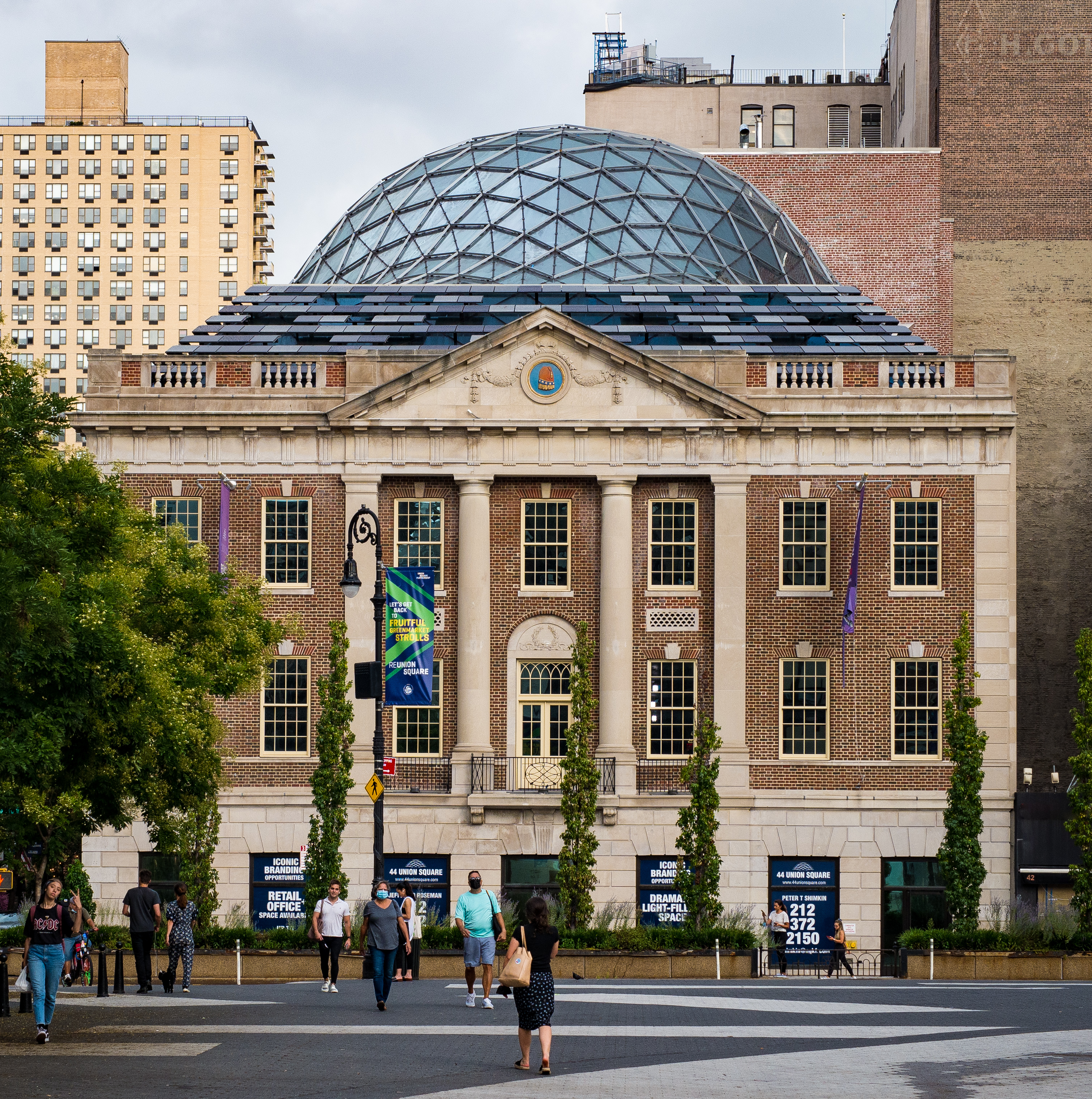
- Exterior of 44 Union Square in August 2021
- Alternative names: 100 East 17th Street, Tammany Hall Building

General information
- Type: Office, retail
- Architectural style: Neo-Georgian
- Location: Union Square, Manhattan, 44 Union Sq E, New York City, United States
- Coordinates: 40°44′11″N 73°59′20″W
- Named for: Tammany Hall
- Groundbreaking: 1928
- Opened: July 4, 1929
- Renovated: 2016–2020
- Cost: $8 million
- Renovation cost: $67 million
- Landlord: Liberty Theatres

Technical details
- Floor count: 3

Design and construction
- Architects: Thompson, Holmes & Converse and Charles B. Meyers

Renovating team
- Architect: BKSK Architects

New York City Landmark
- Designated: November 29, 2013
- Reference no.: 2490

44 Union Square, also known as 100 East 17th Street and the Tammany Hall Building, is a three-story building at 44 Union Square East in Union Square, Manhattan, in New York City. It is at the southeast corner of Union Square East/Park Avenue South and East 17th Street. The neo-Georgian structure was erected in 1928–1929 and designed by architects Thompson, Holmes & Converse and Charles B. Meyers for the Tammany Society political organization, also known as Tammany Hall. It is the organization's oldest surviving headquarters building.

The Tammany Society had relocated to 44 Union Square from a previous headquarters on nearby 14th Street. At the time of the building's commission, the society was at its maximum political popularity with members such as U.S. senator Robert F. Wagner, governor Al Smith, and mayor Jimmy Walker. However, after Tammany Hall lost its influence in the 1930s, the building was sold to an affiliate of the International Ladies' Garment Workers' Union in 1943. By the 1980s, it was used by the Union Square Theatre, while the New York Film Academy took space in 1994.

The New York City Landmarks Preservation Commission designated the building as a city landmark in 2013, and it was converted into an office and retail structure during a renovation that took place between 2016 and 2020. The renovation preserved the facade while totally gutting the interior, and a glass domed roof was added to honor Chief Tamanend, namesake of the Tammany Society.

== Architecture ==
44 Union Square, a 3 1/2-story neo-Georgian building, was designed by Charles B. Meyers along with Thompson, Holmes & Converse. It was commissioned for Tammany Hall, a prominent Democratic Party political organization in New York City. The building measures 79 feet (24 m) on its western facade along Union Square East and 150 feet (46 m) on its northern facade along 17th Street. The particular neo-Georgian features in the Tammany Hall Building include Flemish bond brickwork; rectangular windows with stone keystones, set in arched openings; and wrought-iron balconies. The facades along Union Square East and on 17th Street are both arranged to give the appearance of symmetry. The bracketed gable, on the pediment above the portico, is not of neo-Georgian design but was likely inspired by a niche on the facade of the 14th Street building.

The exterior design features are evocative of government buildings in the American colonial and Federal styles that were built in the later 19th century, when the society was founded. These features include a first level above a raised basement; a portico on Union Square East, with a pediment supported by columns in the Doric order; a hip roof; and a frieze running along the top of the structure. According to a commemorative publication from the Tammany Society, these features were inspired by the design of Federal Hall in Lower Manhattan, as well as by Somerset House in London. The Tammany Hall Building was one of several structures built in New York City in the early 20th century whose designs were inspired by government buildings. Other such structures included The Town Hall near Times Square, the Museum of the City of New York on the Upper East Side, and the original Staten Island Museum building in St. George.

=== Facade ===
The facade consists of limestone at the basement and first level. and English red brick on the second story and above. The Old Virginia Brick Company, who created the exterior brick, said in an advertisement that the hardiness of the brick, in conjunction with the "softening and toning down of the limestone", would turn the building into an enduring symbol of New York City's "historic yester-years". The building is topped by a glass-and-steel dome measuring 11,250 square feet (1,045 m^{2}), which is placed on bearings around the building's perimeter.

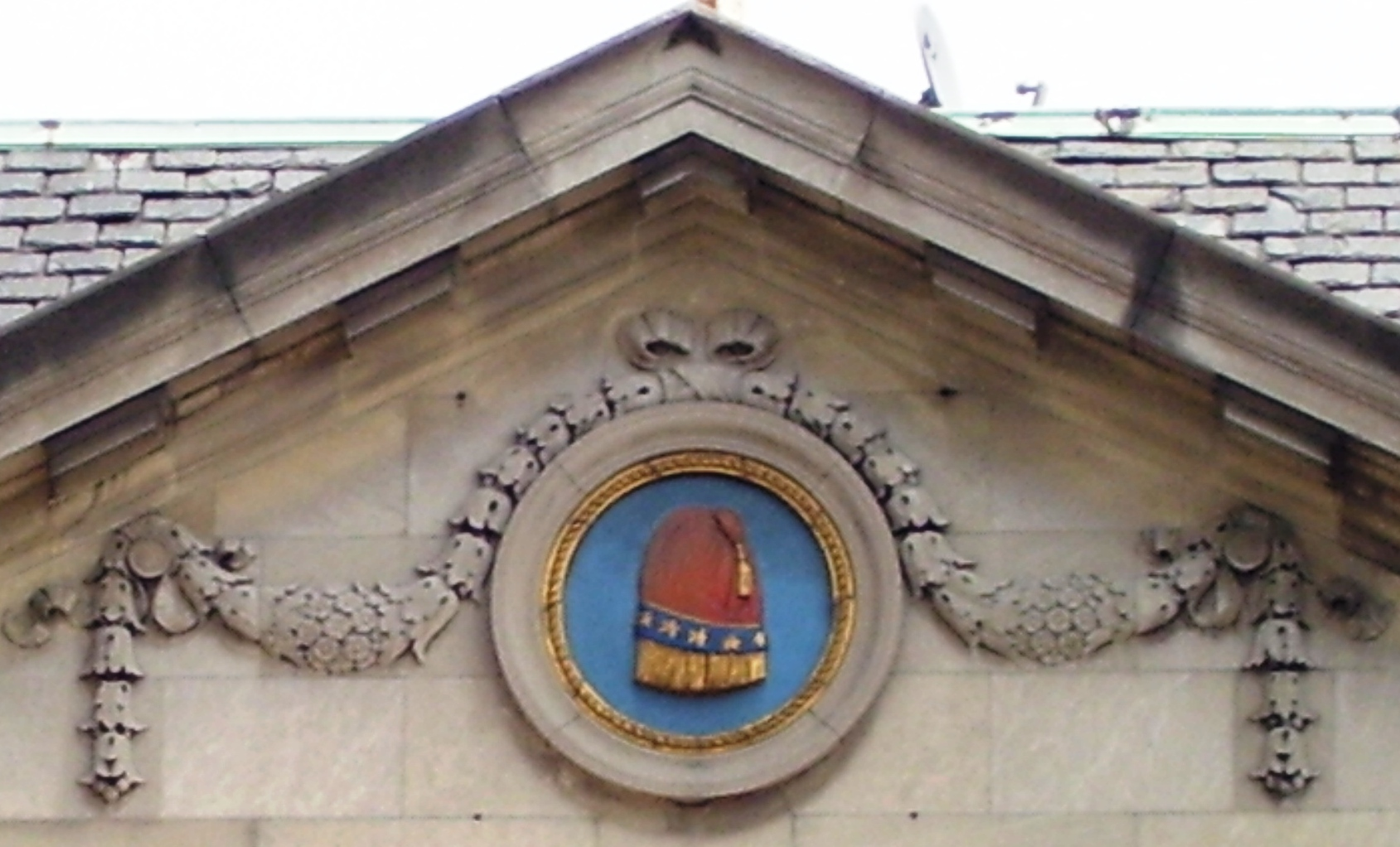
Tammany Hall logo on the pediment

On Union Square East, within the center of the first floor, was the entrance to the commercial space on the first floor. The commercial space is located below a second-floor balcony. The balcony is located in the center of the facade, below the pedimented portico. In the round-arched gable of the pediment, above the portico, there is a panel depicting arrows intertwined with an olive branch, which flank Tammany Hall's circular logo.

On 17th Street, there is a set of triple arches in the center of the first floor, which originally provided egress from the building's auditorium. The main entrance to the theater and elevator lobby was located to the right (west) side of the arches, and a similar arch grouping was located to the left (east). Above the first floor, in the center of the building, is an inscription reading "1786 THE SOCIETY OF TAMMANY OR COLUMBIAN ORDER 1928".

=== Features ===
According to a book published by the Tammany Society in 1936, the western half of the building contained various offices. The Tammany Society had exclusive use of the third floor, which included a central lounge, a club room, office and meeting rooms, and various waiting rooms. The Democratic County Committee was located on the second floor. The first floor was occupied by commercial space. Starting in 2016, the basement, first, and second floors were renovated into 27,485 square feet (2,550 m^{2}) of retail space. The floors and walls are made of reinforced concrete.

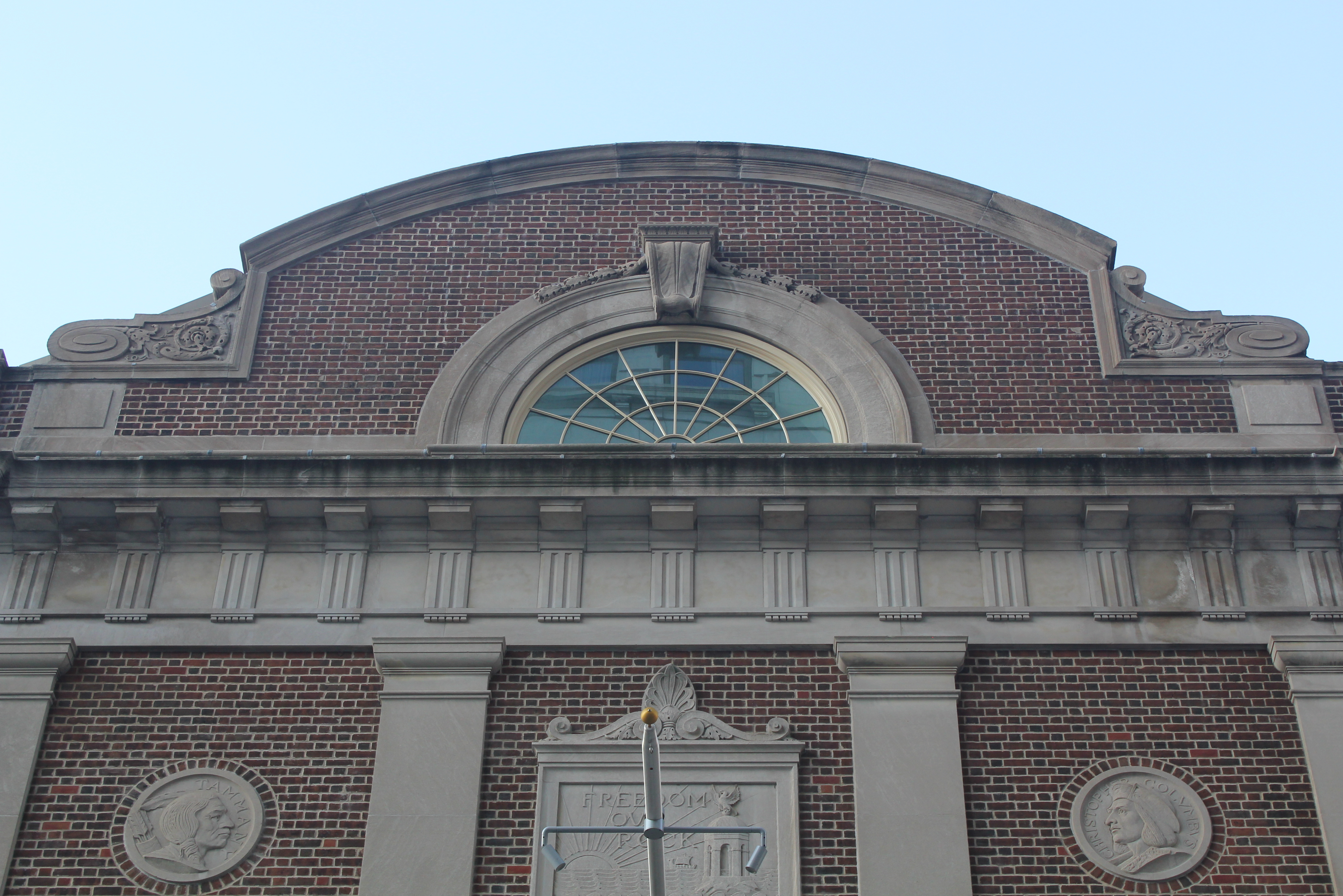
Rounded pediment on the 17th Street elevation

The eastern half of the building was occupied by the 1,200-seat auditorium, which took up the first to third floors. In the basement below the auditorium was a waiting room, accessed from an elevator lobby. Stairways led to the second-floor balcony. The auditorium was demolished in 2016 to make way for 43,106 square feet (4,000 m^{2}) of office space.

The glass domed roof, reminiscent of the rising turtle shell from the Lenape creation story, was added during the 2016–2020 renovation to honor Chief Tamanend, namesake of the Tammany Society. With the dome, the ceiling heights on the fifth floor range between 12 and 21 feet (3.7 and 6.4 m) while the sixth floor has a ceiling height of up to 19 feet (5.8 m).

== History ==
By the first decade of the 20th century, Union Square in Manhattan had grown into a major transportation hub with several elevated railroad and streetcar lines running nearby, and the New York City Subway's 14th Street–Union Square station having opened four years prior. The area had also become a major wholesaling district with several loft buildings, as well as numerous office buildings. The office structures included the Everett Building, erected at the northwest corner of Park Avenue South and 17th Street in 1908; the Germania Life Insurance Company Building, erected at the northeast corner of the same intersection in 1910–1911; and the Consolidated Gas Building (later Consolidated Edison Building), constructed three blocks south at 14th Street between 1910 and 1914. By the 1920s, the remaining buildings in Union Square were occupied by theaters, while most buildings on the eastern part of the square were owned by department stores S. Klein and Ohrbach's.

The previous headquarters of Tammany Hall had been on 14th Street next to the Consolidated Gas Building. The organization—named after Tamanend, the chief of the Lenape who originally occupied New York City—extensively used Native American titles and terminology, for instance referring to their headquarters as a wigwam. After the expansion of the Consolidated Gas building was announced in 1926, the old Tammany Hall "wigwam" was sold to J. Clarence Davis and Joseph P. Day, of real estate syndicate D&D Company, on December 6, 1927. D&D Company sold the old wigwam again to Consolidated Gas in January 1928. There were allegations that Tammany leaders profited from the sale of the headquarters, which Tammany leader George Washington Olvany denied. Day, a long-time member of Tammany Hall, eventually agreed to give the $70,000 profit from the sale (equivalent to $1,313,000 in 2025) to Tammany.

=== Construction ===
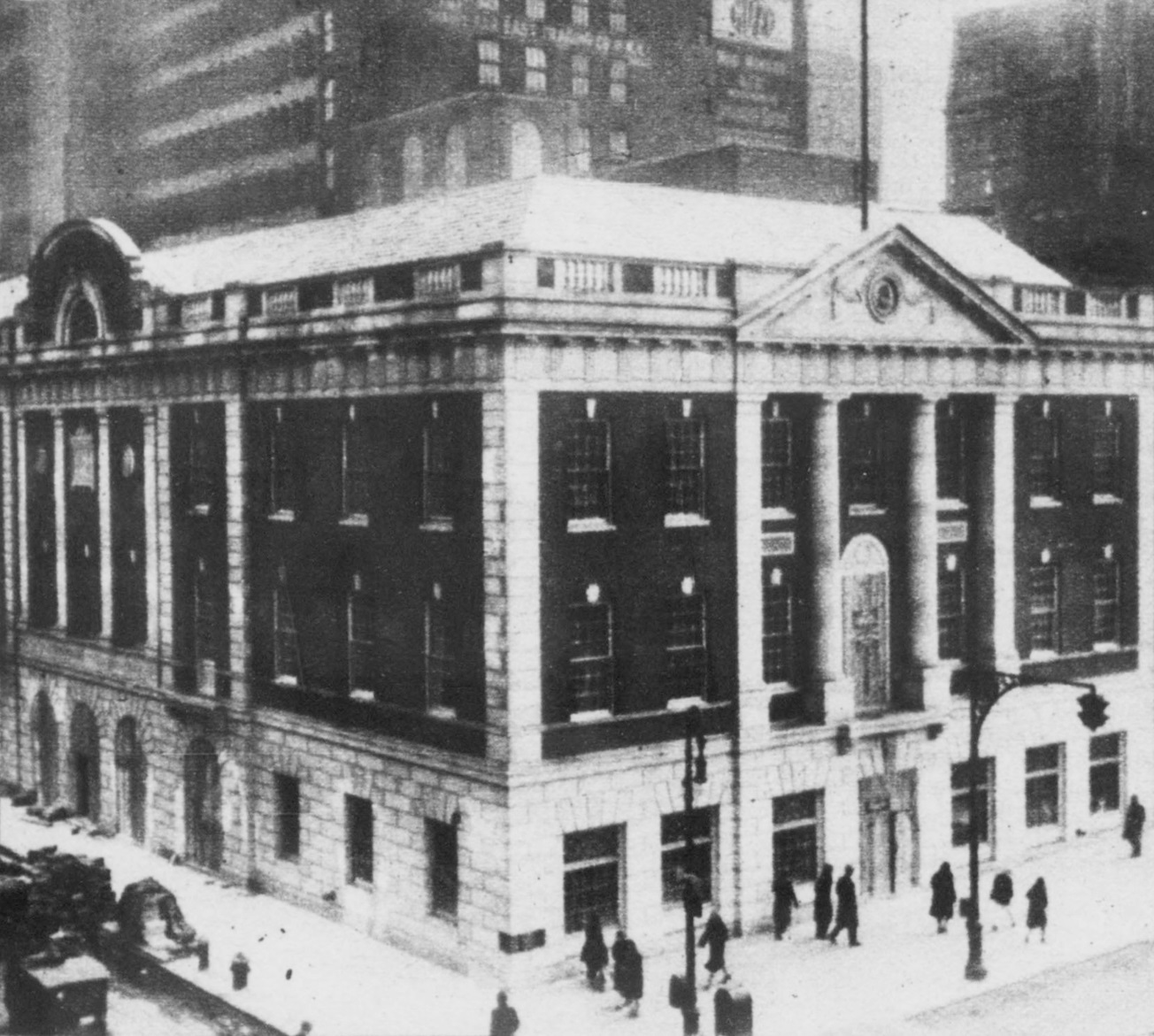
44 Union Square nearing completion, January 1929

One week after the sale of the old "wigwam", Tammany purchased a site nearby, at 44 Union Square East near the southwest corner with Park Avenue South and East 17th Street. Olvany announced the sale on December 14, 1927. As originally proposed, the Tammany Hall Building was an American colonial style building, measuring 150 feet (46 m) on 17th Street by 105 feet (32 m) on Union Square East, with storefronts on the ground floor and a 1,200-seat auditorium. At the time of the announcement, the society's members included state senators Robert F. Wagner and Al Smith: the former would become U.S. senator for New York, while the latter would become the state's governor and 1932 presidential candidate. According to the New York City Landmarks Preservation Commission, the old headquarters was associated with the society's corrupt past under William M. "Boss" Tweed, while the new headquarters' construction represented its future and an opportunity for Smith.

In January 1928, a month after the purchase of the site, Charles B. Meyers was selected along with Thompson, Holmes & Converse as the building's architects. The plans were submitted to the New York City Department of Buildings that April. Tammany Hall remained in its old headquarters until July 4, 1928, so it could celebrate the U.S. Independence Day at that location. Immediately afterward, it moved to a temporary space at 2 Park Avenue. Construction progressed quickly, without any cornerstone-laying ceremony to mark the start of work, and by December much of the structure was substantially complete. The New York County Democratic Committee, a club for Democratic officials representing New York County (Manhattan), started using the new structure on January 2, 1929, and the ceremonial cornerstone was laid the next week, marking the completion of the facade.

=== Tammany and union uses ===
The "wigwam" at 44 Union Square was finished by early July 1929. A dedication celebration was held on July 4, 1929. Governor Franklin D. Roosevelt and former governor Smith spoke at the dedication. The structure had cost $350,000 to erect (equivalent to $8,101,000 in 2025). Shortly after, during the early 1930s, Tammany Hall started to lose its political influence. Although Roosevelt was also a Democrat, he did not regard Tammany highly, opening several corruption investigations into the organization. Roosevelt's election to U.S. president in 1933, as well as the election of Republican mayoral candidate Fiorello H. La Guardia the same year, contributed to the downfall of the Tammany Society.

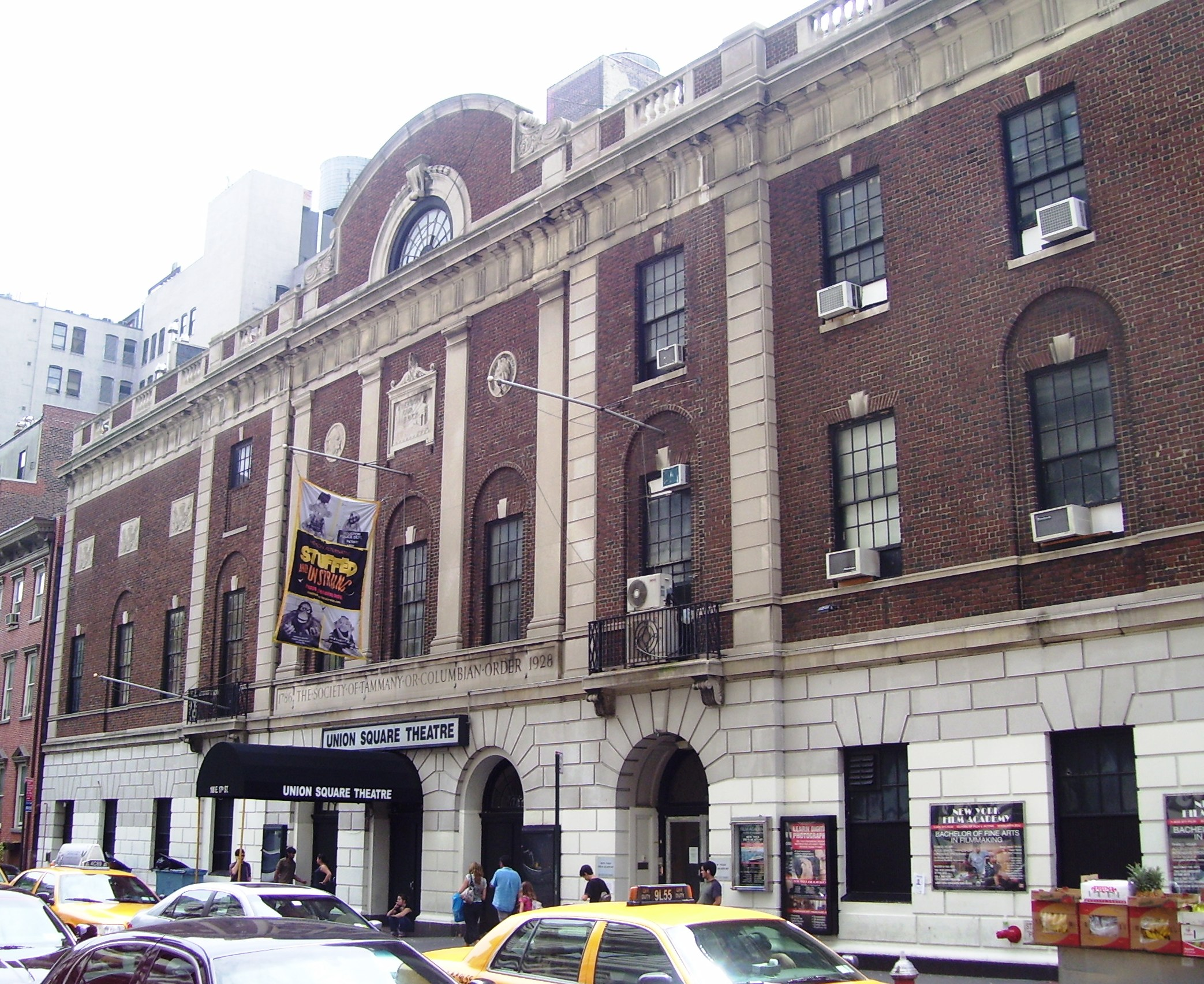
Seen from 17th Street

By the early 1940s, the Tammany Society could no longer afford to maintain its "wigwam". Local 91, a local affiliate of the International Ladies Garment Workers Union (ILGWU), was simultaneously looking for a new headquarters and offered to purchase the structure in April 1943. The sale was finalized that September. Tammany's leaders moved to the National Democratic Club on Madison Avenue, and the Society's collection of memorabilia went into a warehouse in the Bronx. The New York County Democratic Committee, meanwhile, moved to other quarters in Midtown Manhattan. The ILGWU enlarged the stage and furnished the offices, officially rededicating the building on December 18, 1943, at an event with several leaders including mayors La Guardia and Jimmy Walker. After completing a renovation of the former Tammany building, the ILGWU opened meeting spaces, offices, art studios, and classrooms there.

44 Union Square's auditorium was renamed for the late president Roosevelt in 1947. The Roosevelt Auditorium was used often for other unions' events. For instance, in the 1950s the auditorium was used for meetings of firefighters; gardeners, municipal laborers, and sewage workers; and sanitation workers. The United Federation of Teachers held meetings at the Roosevelt Auditorium in 1960 to resolve a citywide teachers' strike, and again in October 1968 to approve the Ocean Hill/Brownsville teachers' strike. Additionally, several unions in the private sector often met at the Roosevelt Auditorium, such as those of newspaper delivery people; drivers of taxicabs in fleets; hospital workers; and Teamsters unions. In 1969, the auditorium was also the location of a high-profile disagreement between two Central Labor Council leaders, who endorsed opposing candidates in the 1969 New York City mayoral election. By the 1980s, the ILGWU's membership had decreased because of an exodus of garment manufacturers in New York City.

=== Performing arts uses ===
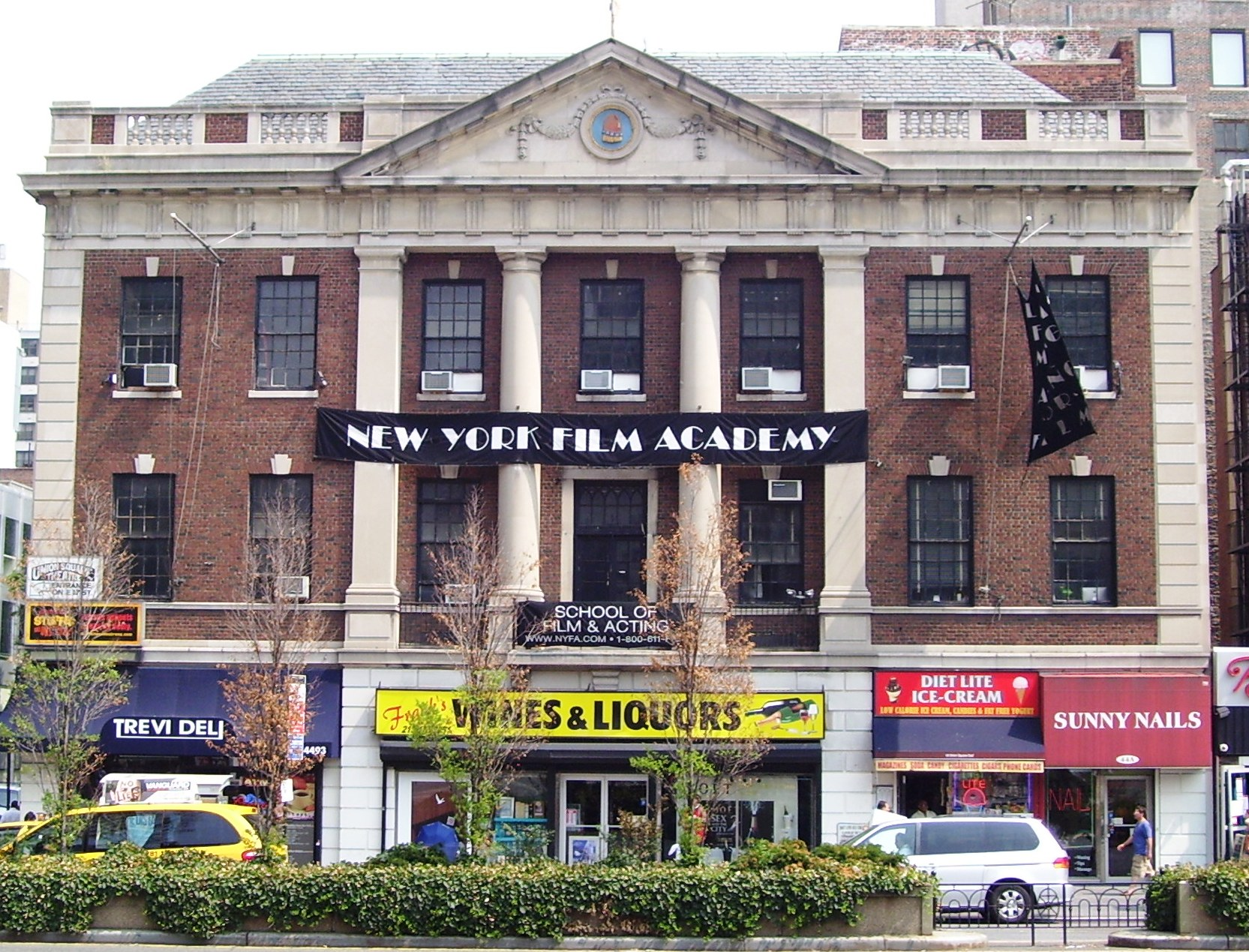
Seen in 2010

At a premiere event for Harold Pinter's play Old Times, ILGWU executive vice president Wilbur Daniels had a chance encounter with Gene Feist, co-founder of Roundabout Theatre Company. After Feist mentioned that the lease of the theater premises at 23rd Street was about to expire, Local 91 leased 44 Union Square to Roundabout in June 1984. As part of the $850,000 renovation (equivalent to $2,634,000 in 2025), the theater was split in half from west to east, reducing its capacity to 499 seats. The stage was expanded, while the balcony and the orchestra were also refurbished. Though the renovated theater was originally slated to open in late 1984, the conversion of the space was delayed by several months. The first performance took place within the space on February 1, 1985. After Roundabout's lease ran out in 1990, it moved to the Criterion Center in Times Square.

44 Union Square was then leased in June 1994 by Alan Schuster and Mitchell Maxwell, who also operated the Minetta Lane Theatre in Greenwich Village. In preparation for converting the space for use as the Union Square Theatre, Schuster and Maxwell renovated the interior, painting the dome a sky-blue hue, and replacing the seats' upholstery with burgundy materials. The building started housing the New York Film Academy in July 1994, and the Union Square Theatre held its first performance in the space that November. The Liberty Theatres, a subsidiary of the Reading Company, operated the Union Square Theatre. In 2001 Liberty Theatres bought the structure from the ILGWU. The air rights above the building were sold to another Reading Company subsidiary in 2005, giving the company the right to theoretically erect another structure above 44 Union Square.

=== Landmark status and redevelopment ===
Though preservationists had been advocating for the New York City Landmarks Preservation Commission (LPC) to designate 44 Union Square an official city landmark since the 1980s, the ILGWU had been indifferent toward landmark status. When Liberty Theatres bought the building, preservationists hoped that the company would be more receptive toward landmark status. However, the effort stalled for several years. The LPC designated it as a city landmark in October 2013, following public meetings held to gauge opinion for the designation, in which 17 people expressed support and no one expressed opposition.

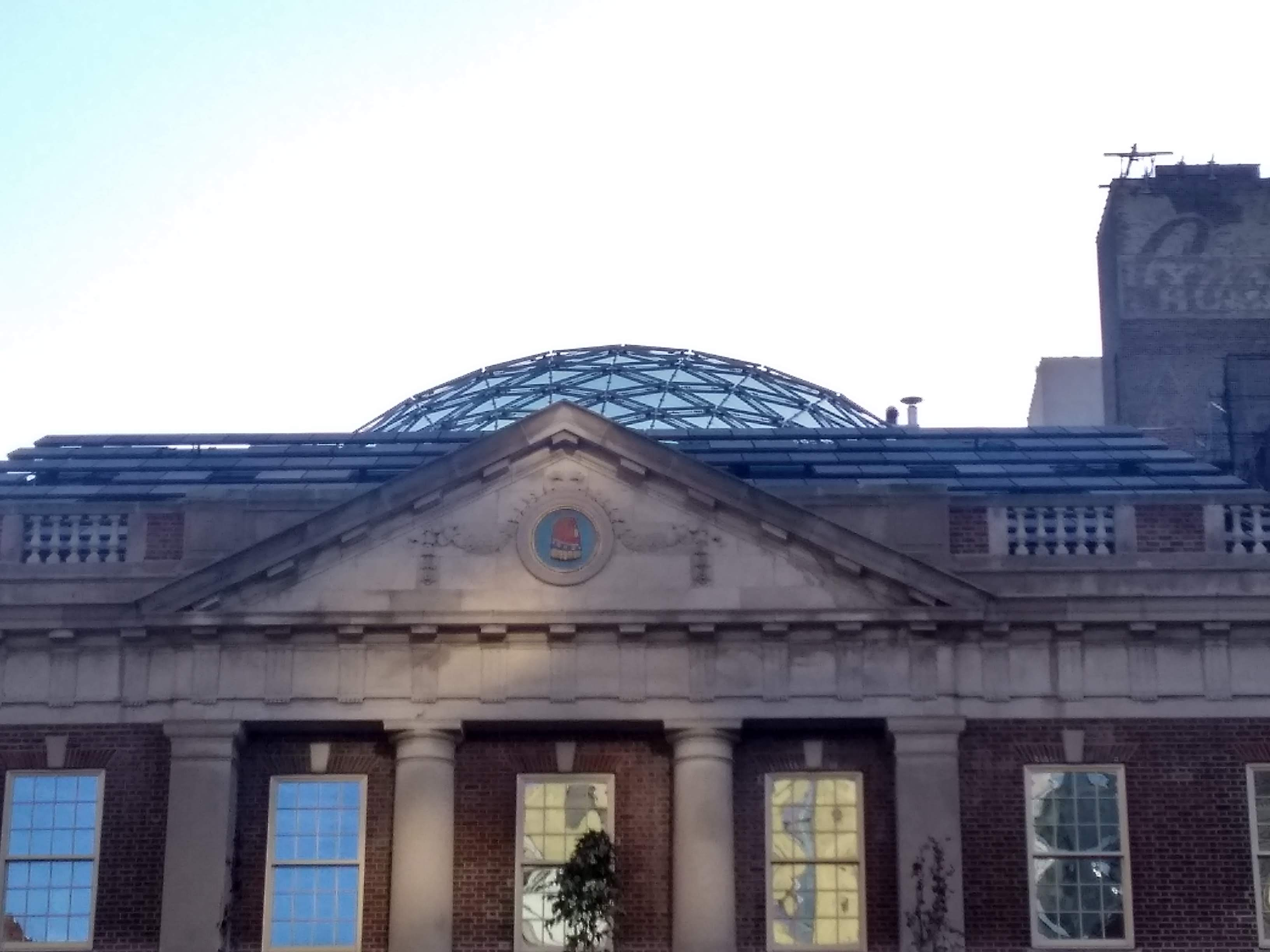
Roof conversion of 44 Union Square, seen in 2019

In the early 2010s, Liberty Theatres announced its plans to refurbish the Tammany Hall Building. As part of the renovation, a glass dome was to be added to the building, though these plans were denied by the LPC in 2014. The following year, a scaled-back version of the glass dome was approved by the commission. The New York Film Academy moved out in late 2015, and all existing tenants were evicted the next year. Prior to the 2016 reconstruction, the owners consulted and received approval from the New York City Lenape Center regarding use of the creation story imagery that inspired the dome design. The LPC had designated the north and west facades of the building, but not the south and east facades, which closely faced neighboring buildings, nor the interior. Salvaged brick from the south and east walls was used in the redevelopment.

The $50 million project, designed by BKSK Architects, began in July 2016. The auditorium and other interior spaces were demolished to make way for retail and office space. The structure, renamed 44 Union Square, was originally slated to have been rebuilt by 2018. The landmarked facades were disconnected from the steel superstructure and temporary bracing was erected to provide support for the facades. The interior was then reconstructed with reinforced concrete walls and floors, and the facades were reattached to the concrete. By February 2019, the glass dome was under construction and the renovation was slated to be completed that year. The dome measures approximately 150 by 75 feet (46 by 23 meters), and features more than 12,000 square feet (1,100 square metres) of glass. To get approval from the preservation commission, the dome was designed with classical proportions when observed from Union Square. The dome was structurally completed in July 2019, and the entire project was substantially completed by July 2020. Prospective tenant Slack Technologies, which was slated to take all the space in 2019, ultimately withdrew from the project in early 2020.

The renovation of 44 Union Square was completed by October 2020. The project won an award for "excellence in safety" from the Engineering News-Record's New York City division. After the completion of work, two members of the center performed a traditional blessing on the building. A Petco pet-supply store opened in the building in June 2023.

== Reception ==
Early architectural critics lauded the Tammany Hall Building as a paragon of the neo-Georgian style in New York City. The Real Estate Record & Guide said that the "severe Colonial columns" placed at the center of both facades contributed to the building's "dignified architectural treatment". The Architecture & Building magazine said that the structure was "well proportioned". George Shepard Chappell, writing in The New Yorker under the pseudonym "T-Square", praised the Tammany Hall Building's "exceptionally charming design", saying that it was a "real adornment" to Union Square.

== See also ==
- List of New York City Designated Landmarks in Manhattan from 14th to 59th Streets
