= Anne Hyde Choate =

Girl Scouting leader (1886–1967)

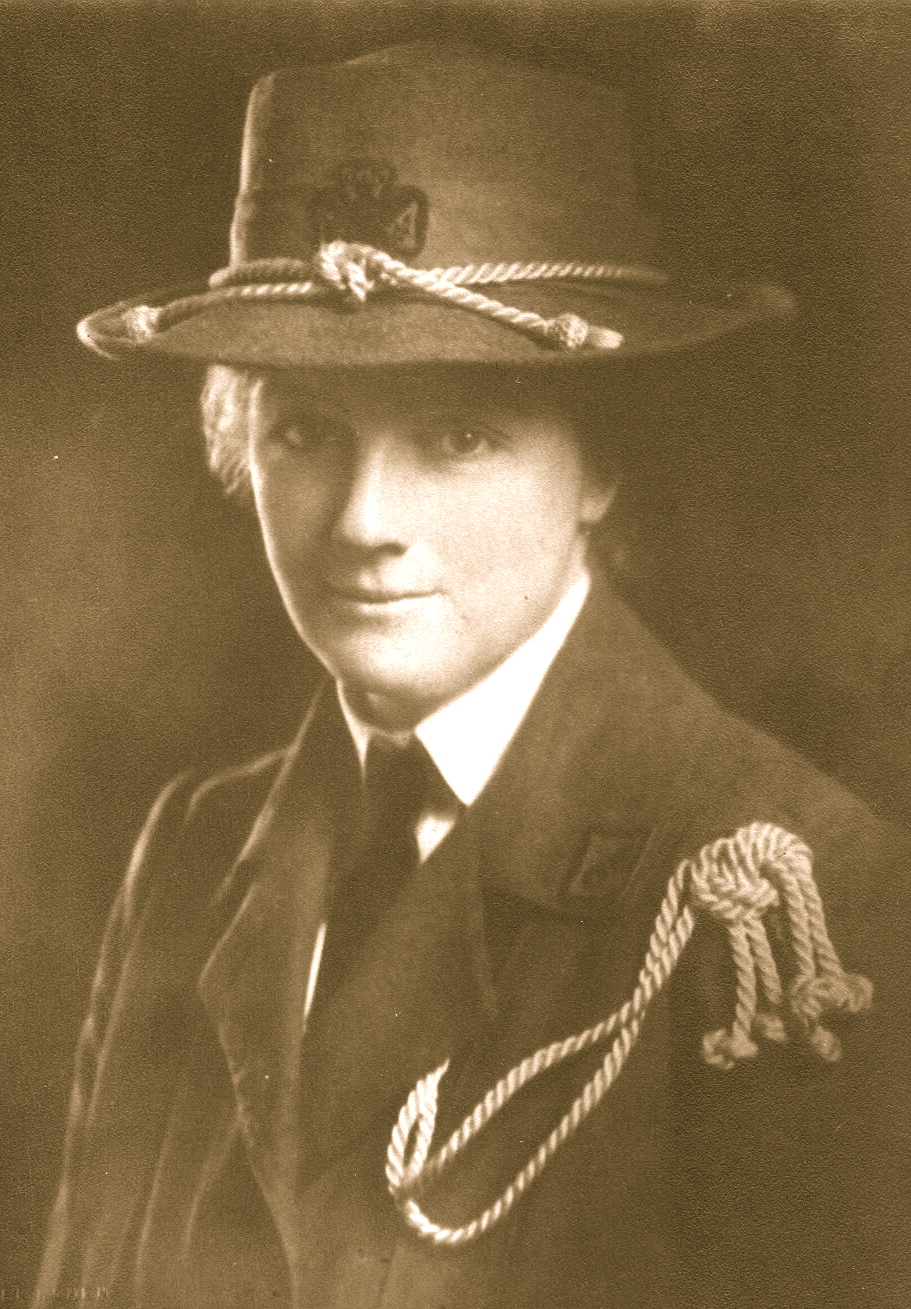
- Born: Anne Hyde Clarke; October 27, 1886; New York
- Died: May 17, 1967 (aged 80)
- Known for: Early and prominent leader in the Girl Scouts of the USA and in the World Association of Girl Guides and Girl Scouts

Anne Hyde Clarke Choate (October 27, 1886 – May 17, 1967) was an early and prominent leader in the Girl Scouts of the USA and in the World Association of Girl Guides and Girl Scouts (WAGGGS).

== Biography ==
Born Anne Hyde Clarke in New York, her godmother was Juliette Gordon Low, later to be founder of the Girl Scouts in the United States. At Low's invitation she visited England, during which trip she met her future husband Arthur Choate, nephew of Joseph Choate, the U.S. Ambassador to Great Britain. They married in 1907 and lived in Pleasantville, New York. They had five children, and they moved to 52 East 83rd Street in Manhattan in 1919, where they lived until 1947. He died in 1962.

In 1915, at the request of Juliette Low, she started working with the new troop in Pleasantville. In 1916 she became a national vice president for the Girl Scouts, and in 1920 she became the second president, succeeding Juliette Low. After she finished her term in 1922, she turned to international Scouting, though she remained a vice-president until 1937 and an ex officio member of the board until her death. She chaired the Juliette Low World Friendship Committee from 1927 when it was founded after the death of Juliette Low to 1955 and was closely involved in Our Chalet including becoming chairman. She attended her last international conference in Tokyo in 1966 and died the following year at the age of 80 in her home in New York. Very active even in her old age, she was horseback riding almost daily until breaking her clavicle in a riding accident about four months before her death.

She was also interested in historic preservation which she combined with Scouting when she successfully worked to preserve Juliette Low's birthplace in Savannah, Georgia.

== Quotes ==
"Scouting is more than just play, it builds health, a sense of social responsibility, democracy, character, through the teachings of generosity, initiative, reliability, loyalty, self-control, cheerfulness, obedience, usefulness and thrift."
