= William Schickel House =

House in Manhattan, New York

- U.S. National Register of Historic Places
- New York State Register of Historic Places
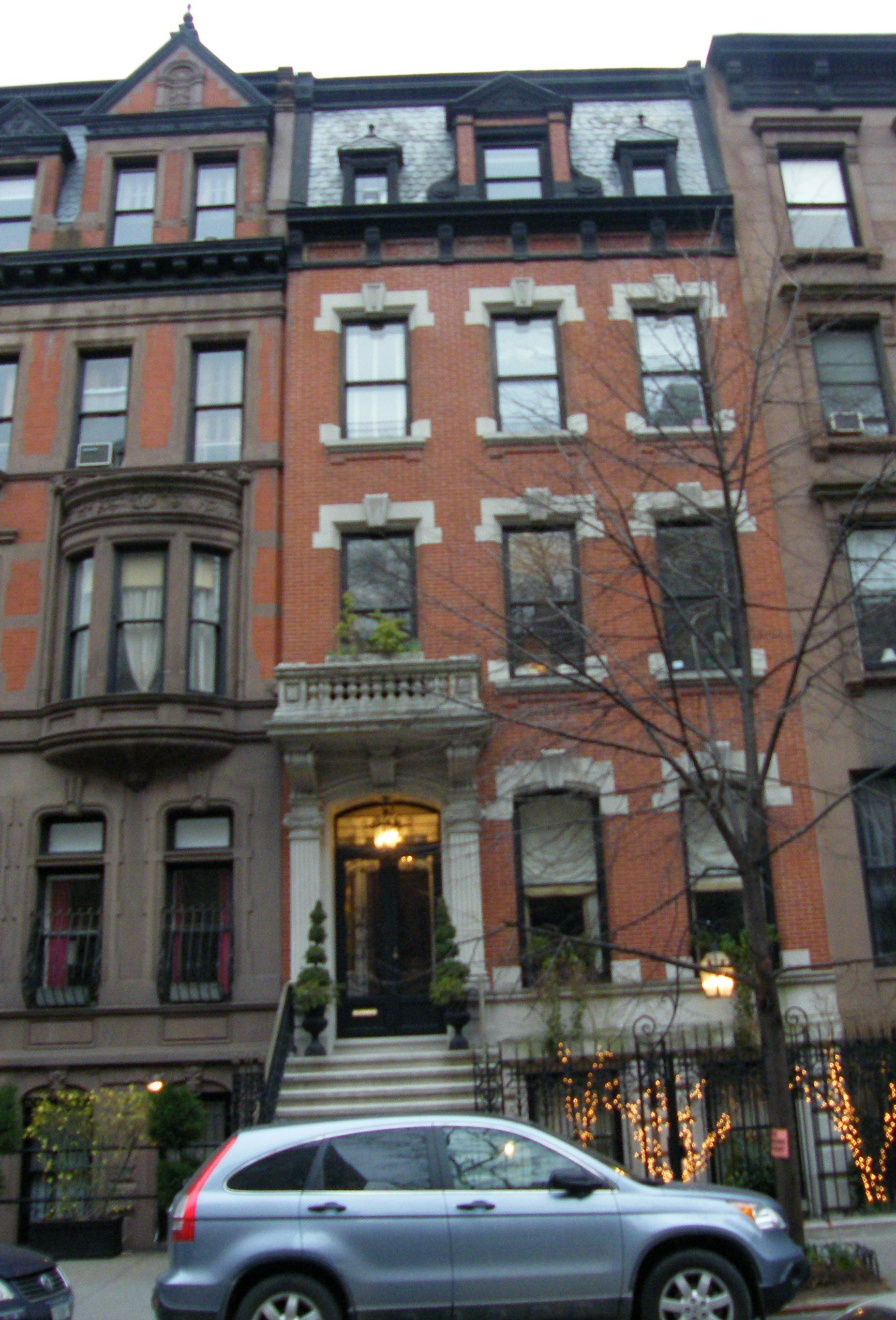

- Location within Manhattan Location within New York City Location within New York Location within the United States
- Location: 52 E. 83rd St., Manhattan, New York, US
- Coordinates: 40°46′43″N 73°57′37″W
- Area: less than one acre
- Built: 1881
- Architect: J. William Schickel
- Architectural style: Second Empire
- NRHP reference No.: 04001326
- NYSRHP No.: 06101.014520

Significant dates
- Added to NRHP: December 6, 2004
- Designated NYSRHP: July 20, 2004

The William Schickel House is a rowhouse at 52 East 83rd Street on the Upper East Side of Manhattan in New York City, New York, US. Designed in the French Second Empire style by J. William Schickel, it was built in 1882. The house has a limestone basement and a brick facade above and is set back from the sidewalk. The interior follows a traditional row house configuration with a stair hall on the side, connecting two parlors. The house was Schickel's residence until his death in 1907; his family sold the house in 1919. It was subdivided into apartments in the late 1940s and became a single-family home again in the 1990s. The house is listed on the National Register of Historic Places.

== Description ==
The William Schickel House is located at 52 East 83rd Street on the Upper East Side of Manhattan in New York City, New York, US. It was designed in the French Second Empire style by J. William Schickel. It occupies a site of 24 by 102 feet (7.3 by 31.1 m) on the south side of the street, between Madison Avenue to the west and Park Avenue to the east. The house is a few blocks north of the Upper East Side Historic District and is surrounded by rowhouses and apartment buildings. The building's immediate neighbors include nine rowhouses from the late 19th century on the same block; 20th-century apartment buildings across the street and at the end of the block; and a school across the street.

Like the adjacent buildings, the Schickel House has a 5-foot-deep (1.5 m) setback from the sidewalk, where there is an iron fence. The house has a raised basement clad with rusticated blocks of limestone. The first through third stories have a brick facade with limestone trim, divided vertically into three bays. The entrance is in the easternmost (left) bay, reached via a high limestone stoop with decorative iron railings. It has an arched doorway with fluted columns and a curved keystone, above which is a stone balcony. The remaining windows have limestone windowsills, in addition to molded lintels with keystones. The third story is topped by a cornice and a brick frieze. The fourth-story windows are placed within a mansard roof with slate tiles; at this story, the central bay has an elaborate pediment. The roof above the fourth story is flat with an asphalt surface.

The interior follows a traditional row house configuration with a stair hall on the side, connecting a pair of parlors at the front and back of the first floor. The interiors are designed in a French Second Empire style, retaining some original decorations such as wood floors, stairs, plaster walls and ceilings, and parlor openings. These are complemented by restored and replicated pieces of wood trim and plasterwork.

== History ==
The building was the personal residence of German-born American architect J. William Schickel (1850–1907), who arrived in the US in age 20. His early designs in the 1870s were of tenement buildings for his fellow German immigrants, but he also designed other New York City buildings such as the Century Building, Church of St. Ignatius of Loyola, and the German Library and Dispensary.

Schickel was hired in the early 1880s to design three houses on Manhattan's Upper East Side for builder Bernard Havanaugh at 46–52 East 83rd Street, on the south side of the street. Schickel designed the three Italianate houses at numbers 46–50 for Havanaugh. These three houses measured 18 feet (5.5 m) wide (except the central, 15-foot-wide (4.6 m) house) and were made of brownstone. After the three houses were finished, Havanaugh gave Schickel a 24-foot-wide (7.3 m) site at 52 East 83rd Street, where Schickel built a $15,000 house. Schickel completed his own house in 1882. At the time, the Real Estate Record called 83rd Street "one of the choicest streets in the northern section of the city".

After moving in, Schickel lived in the house for the rest of his life. After Schickel's death, his wife, their eight children, and their servants continued to live there. In 1919, the Schickel estate sold the building. The buyer was the family of the banker Arthur O. Choate, whose wife Anne Hyde Choate was an executive with Girl Scouts of the USA. The Choates hosted various events at the house for the Girl Scouts, including dinners with Girl Scouts leaders Juliette Gordon Low, Sarah Louise Arnold, and US First Lady Lou Henry Hoover. The house was sold in 1946 to a client of lawyer George Popkin and was subdivided into apartments in 1947. After a half-century of apartment use, the house became a single-family home again in the 1990s. The house was added to the National Register of Historic Places in 2004.

== See also ==
- National Register of Historic Places listings in Manhattan from 59th to 110th Streets
- 49 East 80th Street, another nearby rowhouse on the National Register of Historic Places

== Sources ==
- National Register of Historic Places Inventory/Nomination: William Schickel House (PDF) (Report). National Park Service. 2004.
