= Century Building (Union Square, Manhattan) =

Commercial building in New York City

- U.S. National Register of Historic Places
- New York State Register of Historic Places
- New York City Landmark
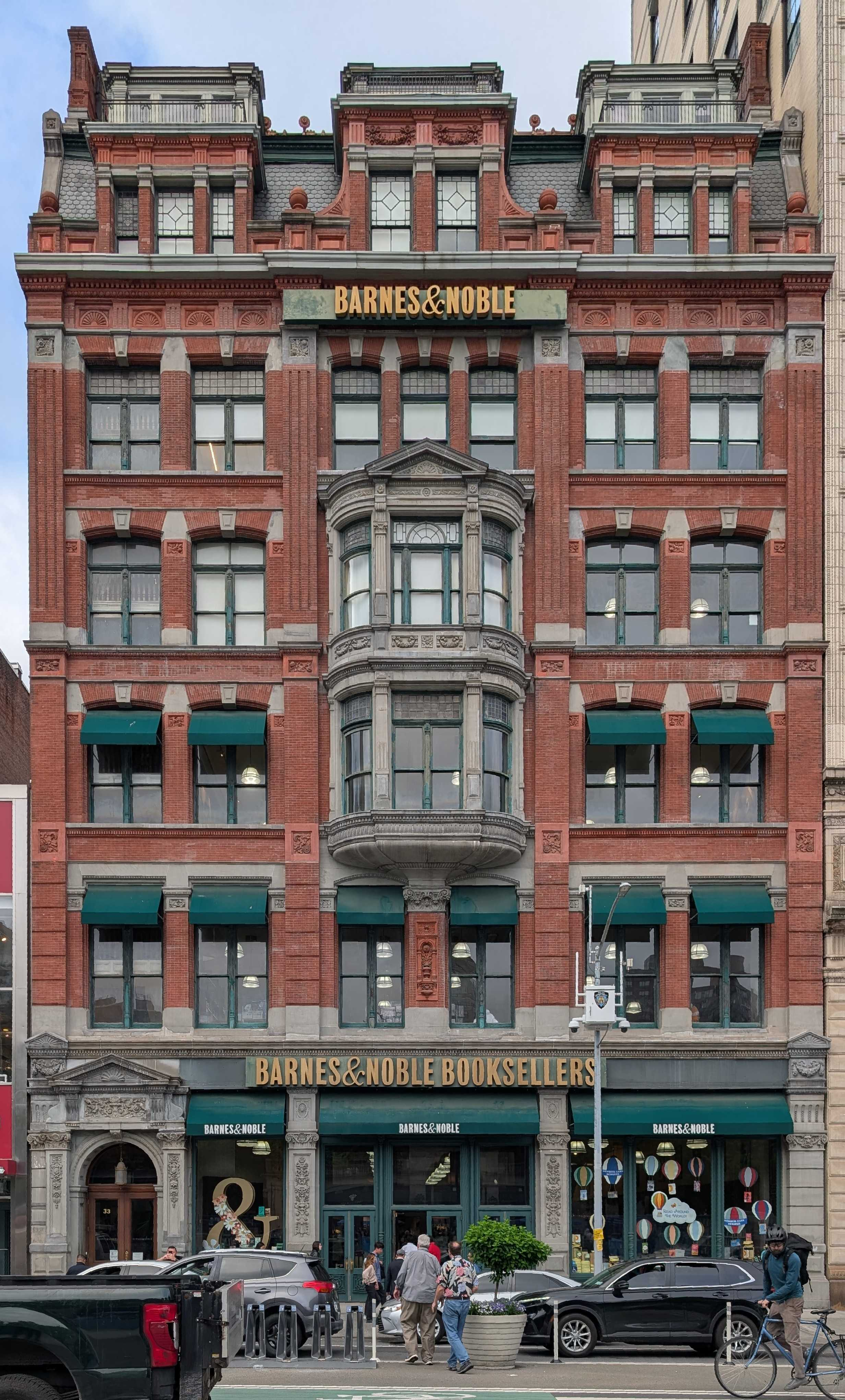
- (2025)

- Location within Manhattan Location within New York City Location within New York Location within the United States
- Interactive map of Century Building
- Location: 33 East 17th Street; Manhattan, New York City
- Coordinates: 40°44′13″N 73°59′23″W
- Built: 1880–1881
- Architect: William Schickel
- Architectural style: Queen Anne
- NRHP reference No.: 97001148
- NYSRHP No.: 06101.007399
- NYCL No.: 1539

Significant dates
- Added to NRHP: September 18, 1997
- Designated NYSRHP: July 22, 1997
- Designated NYCL: October 7, 1986

The Century Building (formerly also known as the Drapery Building) is a Queen Anne style building at 33 East 17th Street between Park Avenue South and Broadway in Union Square, Manhattan, New York City. It was designed by William Schickel and built in 1880–1881 by Arnold Constable & Company. The Century Building consists of five floors topped by a 1 1/2-story attic.

The Century Building was constructed as a speculative development with no main tenant. The building contained the headquarters of the Century Publishing Company from 1881 until 1915, and was also occupied by various other commercial and industrial concerns. Left vacant in the late 1970s, it was renovated into a Barnes & Noble bookstore in 1995. The Century Building was designated a New York City landmark in 1986, and was added to the National Register of Historic Places in 1997.

== History ==
=== Planning and construction ===
Union Square was first laid out in the Commissioners' Plan of 1811, expanded in 1832, and then made into a public park in 1839. The completion of the park led to the construction of mansions surrounding it, and the Everett House hotel, located at 33 East 17th Street, was among several fashionable buildings completed around Union Square. After the American Civil War, Union Square became a primarily commercial area and many mansions were destroyed, including Everett House. This coincided with a general trend in development where previously vacant lots north of Lower Manhattan were being developed. Arnold Constable & Company was one of the companies that acquired land in the area, buying several lots on the north end of Union Square, including the site of the former Everett House, in 1867. Arnold Constable & Co. intended to develop the Everett site for their new store, and even signed an agreement with the previous owners to preserve a "light court" on the site, but ultimately decided instead to build their store at the nearby corner of Broadway and 19th Street.

The Arnold family held onto the property for over a decade, with the intention of earning rental income from the as-yet-undeveloped site; in 1879, the family's architect J. William Schickel was commissioned to create plans for a "speculative commercial building" at the site, without an anchor tenant for the building. At the time, real estate market activity had recovered from the Panic of 1873, though properties were still relatively inexpensive and the population was growing. According to the Real Estate Record & Guide, retail development was being concentrated around 14th Street, 23rd Street, and Union Square. Construction on the building started in April 1880, and it was completed 11 months later in March 1881, with the total construction cost being $300,000.

=== 19th-century use ===
Arnold & Constable Co. was able to rent out the building floor-by-floor despite not having a main tenant. One of the building's original tenants was the Century Company, which published the popular The Century Magazine for adults and St. Nicholas Magazine for children. They started renting fifth-floor space for their headquarters in September 1881, having been drawn by the proximity to a park, as well as the building's location within what was then Manhattan's commercial center. Arnold & Constable also rented space to several long-term tenants, including upholsterers Johnson & Faulkner and architect George B. Post, as well as milliners Worthington & Smith and clothing manufacturers Earl & Wilson. The appellation "Century Building" likely came into popular use after the company erected a sign on the rooftop in November 1882.

The bookbinders G. W. Alexander moved to the top floor in 1886, prompting several other tenants to complain that the firm's flammable materials posed a fire hazard, but with no reaction from the owners. On July 7, 1888, a burning glue pot caught fire, destroying the roof and the top floor. Significant damage to the building's other floors occurred when the New York City Fire Department broke holes in the ceiling to stop the fire. The building and its tenants recorded $195,000 in damage. Two firefighters were later dismissed from the force after being accused of stealing collars from Earl & Wilson.

The Century Building became known nationally due to the cachet of its tenants. The Century Company showed its World's Columbian Exposition exhibit at the Century Building in December 1893. One story concerned a runaway child from Indiana who ran away in 1895 "to seek [her] fortune", only to be found with a paper containing the address "33 East Seventeenth Street New-York".

=== 20th and 21st centuries ===
Another fire that started on the second floor and spread up to the fourth floor, in August 1903, destroyed much of the stock of the H. S. Tavshanjian Rug Company, which was located on the third floor. The rug company's subsequent losses were estimated at $55,000, and the company auctioned off their entire inventory for nearly $0.5 million.

Century moved to new quarters in 1914–1915. Soon afterward, the book distributor Baker & Taylor also moved elsewhere. By the 1920s, Union Square was becoming a neighborhood dedicated primarily to manufacturing and wholesaling, and the Century Building's remaining tenants included Johnson & Faulkner as well as Earl & Wilson. Later tenants who occupied the building by the 1930s included William Shaland Toys and Novelties, as well as the Ferguson Brothers Manufacturing Company. The American Drapery & Carpet Company was the building's last ground-floor tenant before it was vacated in the late 1970s, and as such, it was sometimes called the Drapery Building.

By the early 1990s, an observer called 33 East 17th Street an "eyesore". Related Companies and the Carlyle Group leased the building in 1994, after fifteen years of vacancy. and Related later took ownership of the building by 1995. The facade was restored in 1994–1995 by Li/Saltzman Architects, while Related Companies renovated the rest of the building to accommodate a four-story Barnes & Noble bookstore. The bookstore, which opened by late 1995, was one of several buildings in the Union Square area that were redeveloped by Related Companies. Li/Saltzman's renovation received the Preservation Award for Restoration from the Municipal Art Society in 1996.

== Architecture ==
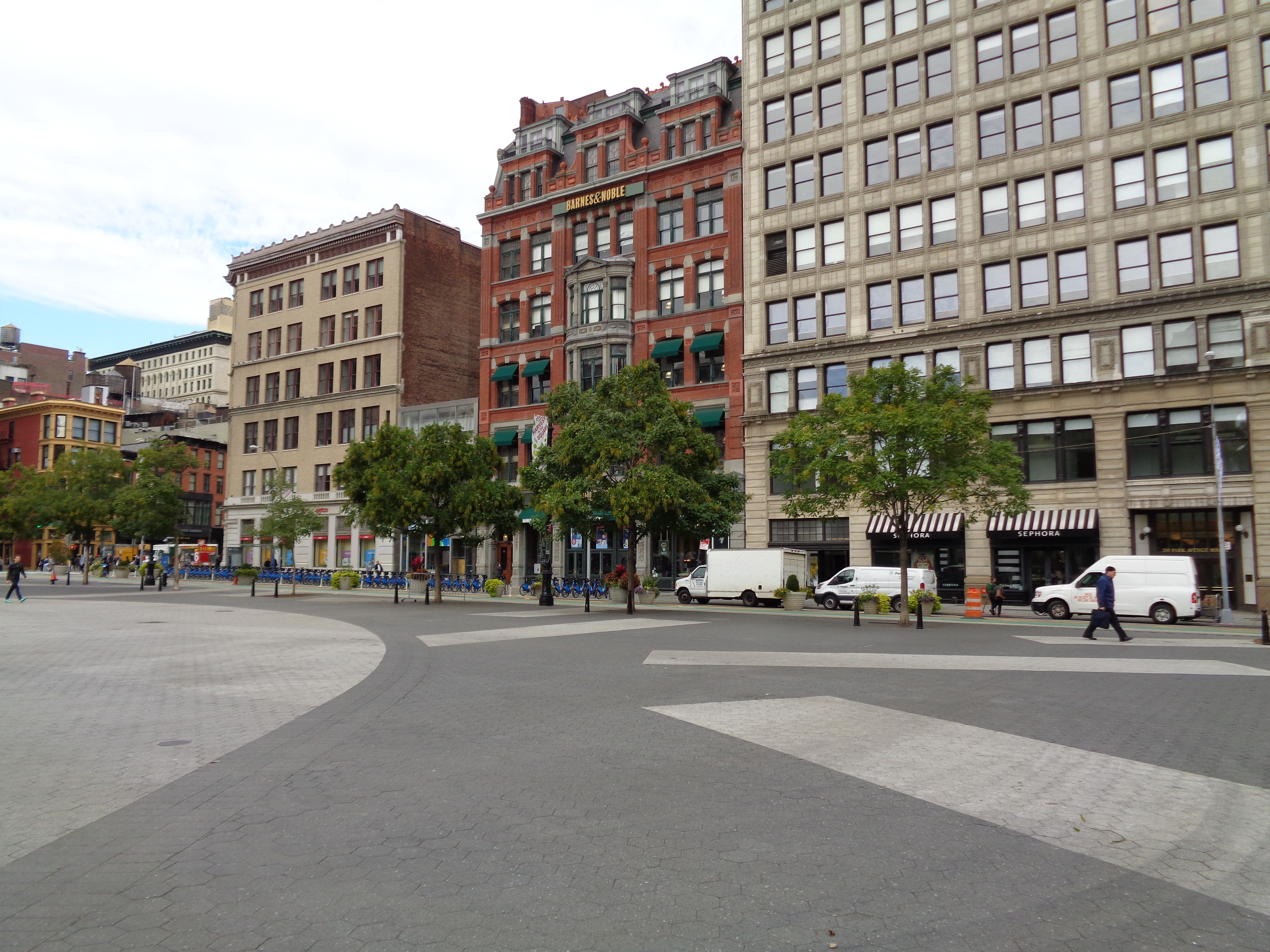
From Union Square; the base of the Everett Building can be seen at right

The Century Building was designed by J. William Schickel. The building is unusual in that it is one of relatively few commercial buildings in the Queen Anne style within New York City. First used in the United States in the 1860s, the Queen Anne style included such features as asymmetric brick facades, stone decorative trim, elaborate ornamentation, and roofs interrupted by dormers or gables. The style was first used for suburban and rural residential buildings until Richard Norman Shaw's New Zealand Chambers, a now-demolished commercial building in London, was built in that style in 1871. Schickel took much inspiration from Shaw's design for New Zealand Chambers.

=== Form ===
The structure contains a footprint in an L shape and extends north through the entire width of the block, with a secondary address at 38-46 East 18th Street. The 18th Street frontage, which measures 120.58 feet (36.75 m), is slightly longer than the frontage on 17th Street, which measures 71.5 feet (21.8 m).

=== Facade ===
The Century Building's use of terracotta moldings and panels was unusual for a commercial building at the time. The building's main facade is the three-bay-wide facade on 17th Street to the south. Elements of the 17th Street facade that are inspired by other buildings include an oriel window on the second story, an off-center entrance at ground level, decorated brick pilasters, ornate ironwork, and stone reliefs featuring motifs from the 17th and 18th centuries. The 18th Street facade to the north is a simplified version of the facade on 17th Street. Schickel also included some Neo-Grec architectural elements such as the largely uninterrupted facade, the decorated iron pilasters on the ground level, and the "gridlike" style formed by the vertical piers and the horizontal divisions between floors.

==== 17th Street ====
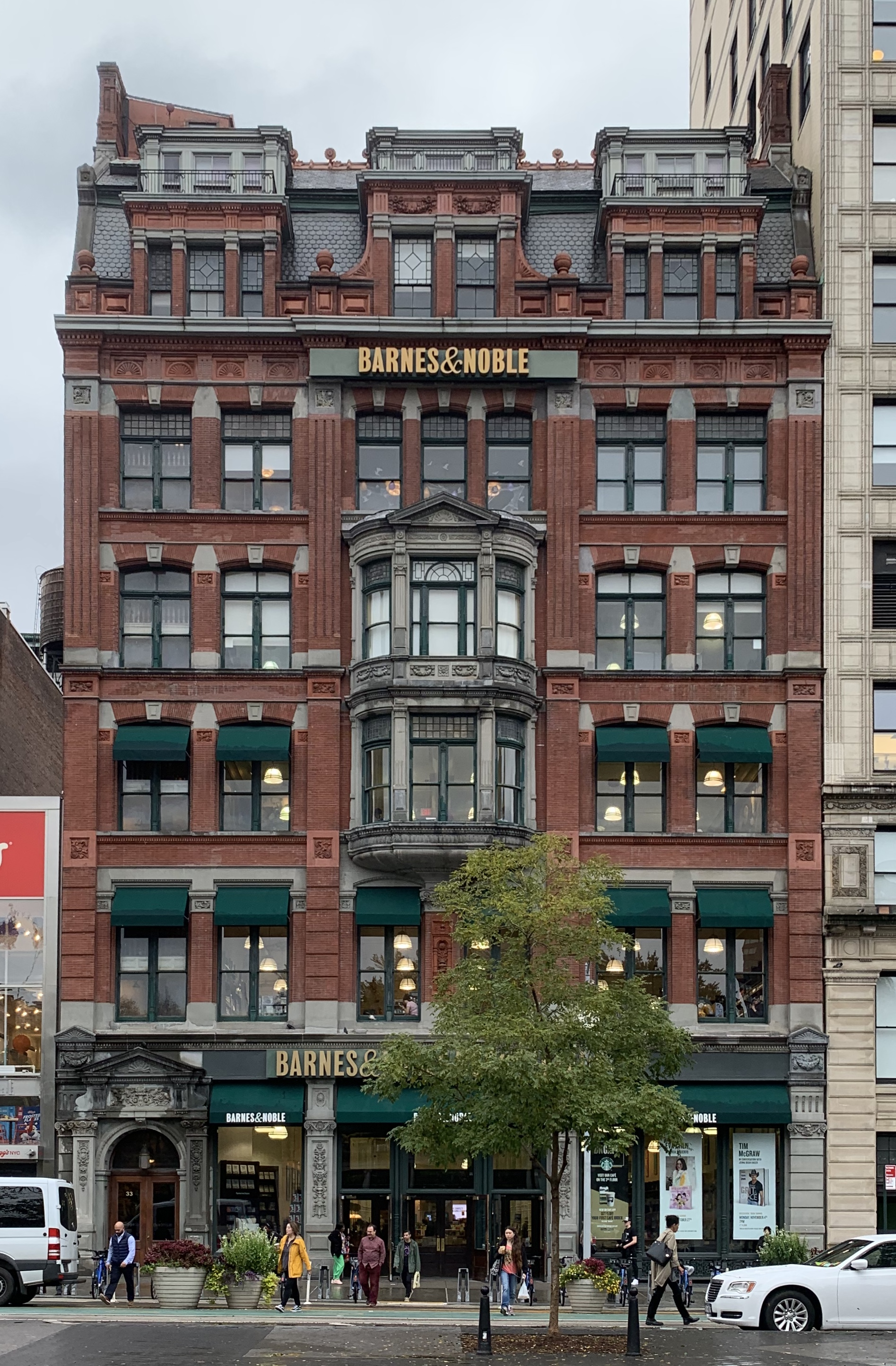
17th Street facade in 2019

The 17th Street facade contains three architectural bays and three layers of articulation: the single-story ground-level retail, the four stories of office floors above, and the 1 1/2 attic section with dormers protruding from the steeply pitched roof.

At ground level, the main entrance is located on the left (west) side of the facade, which leads to stairs to the upper floors. Stone-faced piers with decorated capitals divide the ground-level facade into three major sections, which in turn are subdivided into several smaller sections. Between the two center piers is the Barnes & Noble entrance, with two sets of three double doors. The rest of the facade contains full-height windows with iron frames. The window openings from the basement have been sealed off and covered with iron grates. Immediately above the ground floor, the facade contains terracotta and stone trim, and above that, red brick. A cornice is located above the ground level.

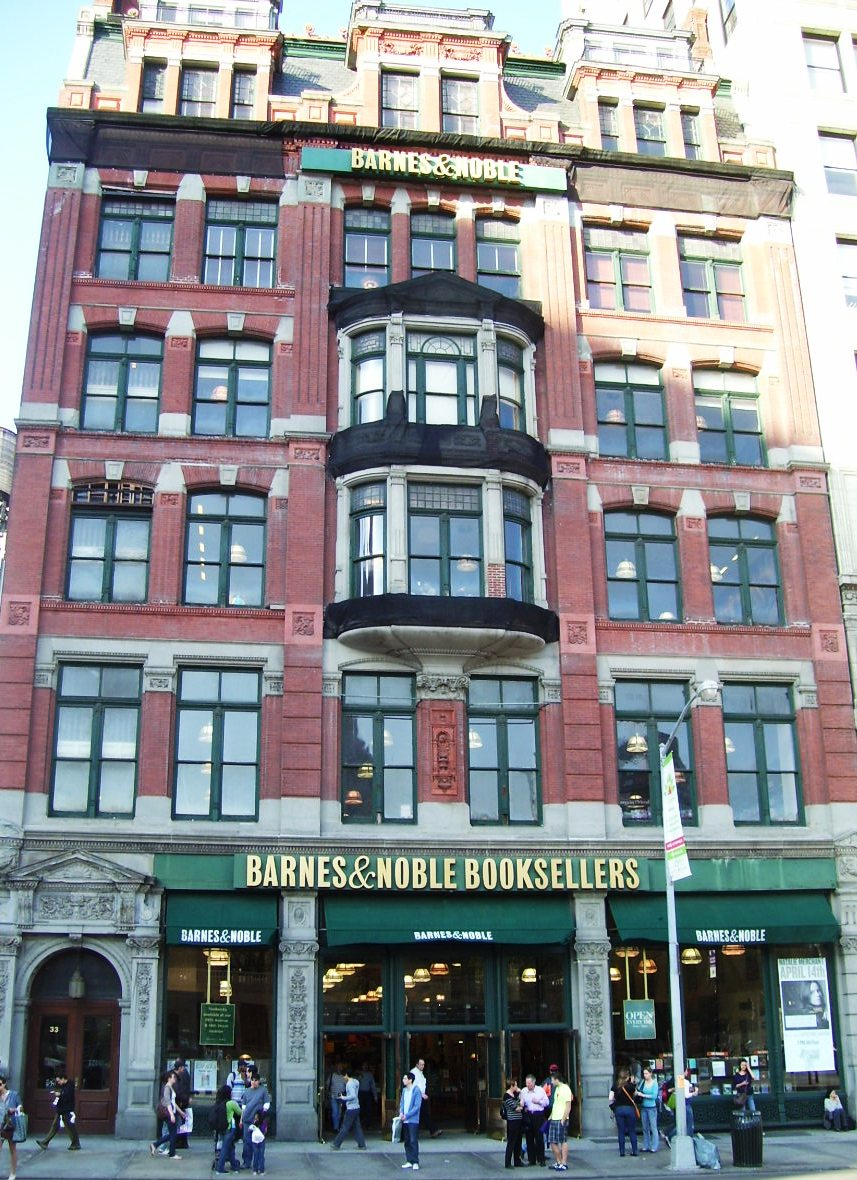
Building in 2010

The second through fifth floors comprise the central section of the facade's vertical articulation, and contain a mostly brick facing, with stone trim at the bottom of the fourth floor and the top of the fifth floor. The bays are separated by brick pilasters with minor styling, which slightly protrude from the facade. On the second through fifth floors, the bays to the left (west) and right (east) each contain two large windows. The second- and fifth-floor windows are rectangular while the third- and fourth-floor windows are slightly arched. The center bay contains more ornate fenestration, except on the second floor, which also contains two large rectangular windows. The center bay on the third and fourth floors contains an oriel window that protrudes slightly and contains three window panes, with the center window pane being twice as wide as the side panes. The oriel contains a triangular pediment above it. The fifth floor contains three narrow rectangular window panes of equal size. The lintels of the second floor windows are made of stone, while the windows on the third through fifth floors contain brick lintels with keystones made of stone. A brick entablature in the Doric order, and a stone cornice, runs above the stone trim on the fifth floor.

The top 1.5 stories consist of a gambrel roof that includes the sixth-floor attic. Three brick-faced dormers protrude from the roof, corresponding to the architectural bays below; the dormers on the sides contain three windows, while the center dormer contains two windows. The tops of the original dormers included tablets with pediments, but S. Edison Gage added another row of roof-line dormers in 1913, These contain a similar articulation to the original dormers, though these are faced with terracotta instead of brick. A brick balustrade runs above the original brick dormers, just below the roof-line. An elevator shed and chimney are located behind the westernmost (leftmost) dormer.

==== 18th Street ====
The 18th Street facade is also divided into three layers of articulation, though the design is much simpler. This facade is divided into five bays, separated by slightly protruding brick pilasters. At ground level, the easternmost (leftmost) three bays contain large metal-frame windows, with grates covering the former window openings from the basement. The third bay also contains an emergency exit. The fourth bay contains a roll-down metal garage door and the fifth, westernmost bay contains a service entrance. There are small windows above the garage door and service entrance in the fourth and fifth bays. A stone cornice runs above the ground level.

On the second through sixth floors, each bay contains three windows. The tops and bottoms of the rectangular second-floor windows contain stone trim. There are stone keystones atop the slightly arched third and fourth-floor windows, and atop the rectangular fifth and sixth-floor windows. A fire escape is mounted between the third and fourth bays, toward the western portion of this facade. A cornice, supported by stone bases that are attached to the vertical piers, runs along the facade between the fifth and sixth floors.

== See also ==
- List of New York City Designated Landmarks in Manhattan from 14th to 59th Streets
- National Register of Historic Places listings in Manhattan from 14th to 59th Streets
- William Schickel House, another New York City building designed by Schickel
