= Everett Building (Manhattan) =

Office building in Manhattan, New York

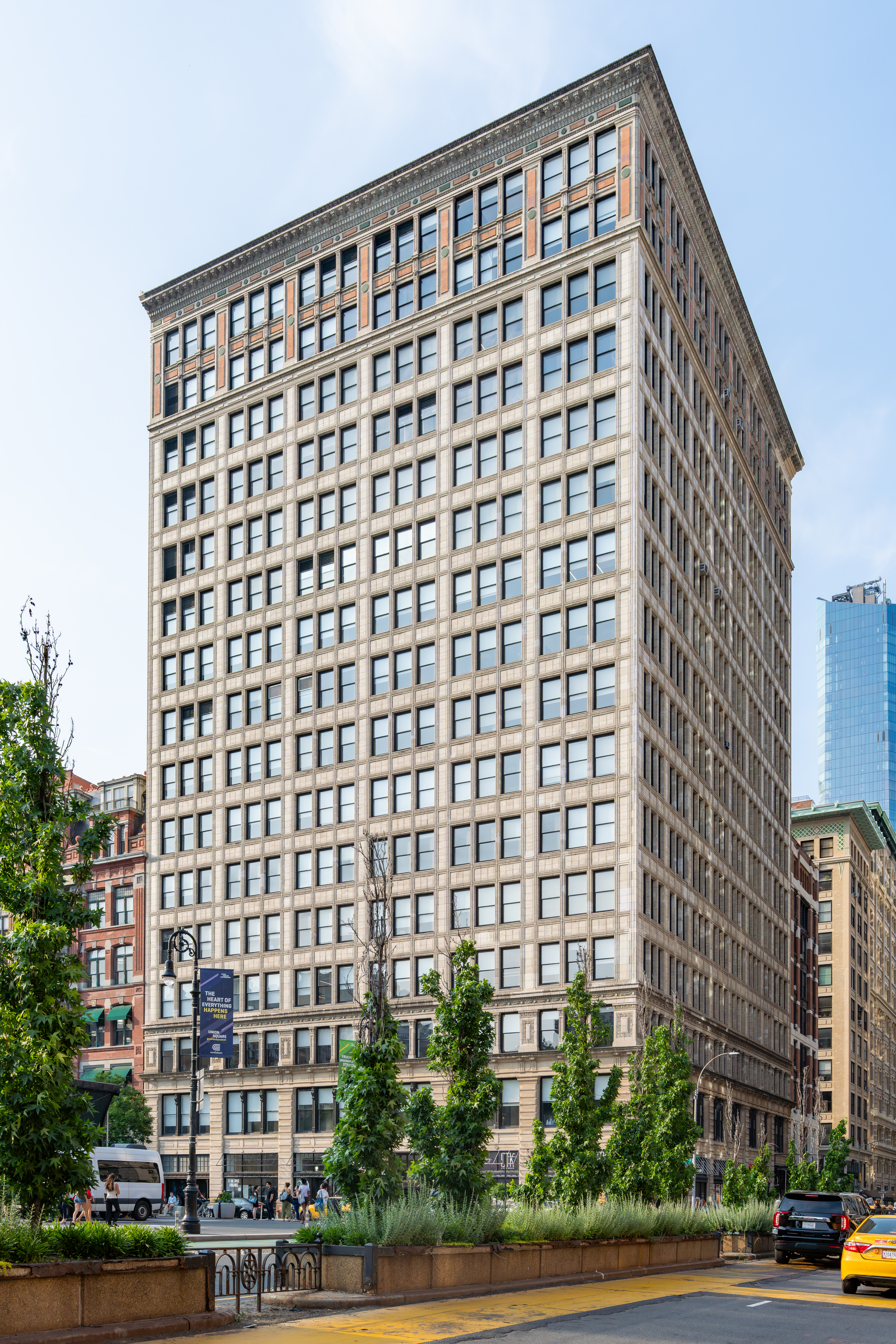
- (2025)
- Interactive map of the Everett Building area

General information
- Location: 200 Park Avenue South; New York City
- Coordinates: 40°44′13″N 73°59′21″W
- Completed: 1908

Height
- Roof: 230 ft (70 m)

Technical details
- Floor count: 16

Design and construction
- Architect: Starrett & van Vleck

New York City Landmark
- Designated: September 6, 1988
- Reference no.: 1540

The Everett Building is a 16-story commercial structure at 200 Park Avenue South at the northwest corner with East 17th Street, on Union Square in Manhattan, New York. It was designed by the architectural firm of Starrett & van Vleck and opened in 1908. Goldwin Starrett, the lead architect, had worked for Daniel Burnham for four years in Chicago, and as such the building reflects Burnham's functionalist philosophy. It marked the development of fireproof commercial skyscrapers with open plan interiors and simple, classical exteriors.

In 1988, the Everett Building was designated a New York City landmark. The Everett Building, along with the W New York Union Square (formerly Germania Life Insurance Company Building) at the northeast corner of Park Avenue South and 17th Street, were described by the New York City Landmarks Preservation Commission as forming an "imposing terminus to Park Avenue South". The Everett Building is located directly east of the Century Building, another New York City landmark.

== History ==
The site of the Everett Building was initially part of the colonial farm owned by Dutch settler Cornelius Tiebout. Union Square was first laid out in the Commissioners' Plan of 1811, expanded in 1832, and then made into a public park in 1839. The completion of the park led to the construction of mansions surrounding it, and the Everett House hotel, located on the north side of East 17th Street, was among several fashionable buildings completed around Union Square. After the American Civil War, Union Square became a primarily commercial area and many mansions were destroyed, including Everett House. By the first decade of the 20th century, Union Square had grown into a major transportation hub with several elevated railroad and streetcar lines running nearby, and the New York City Subway's 14th Street–Union Square station opening in 1904.

Plans for the development of a 20-story office building on the site of Everett House were first announced in June 1908. Goldwin Starrett of Starrett & van Vleck was selected to design the building in early August. When the plans were publicly released at the end of that month, there was high demand for industrial loft and office space in the area. Only four months elapsed between the building's groundbreaking ceremony and the initial spaces being ready for tenants.

Upon opening, the Everett Building was one of the many buildings around Union Square and Park Avenue that were occupied by the cotton, dry-goods, wool, and silk industries. Space in the Everett Building and several others on Union Square's northern end was cheaper than the industrial space on Fifth Avenue, two blocks west, and as a result the Everett Building's space was in high demand. By October 1911, the Real Estate Record & Guide wrote that the Everett Building was fully occupied. Though the building was erected for the Everett Investing Company, its other tenants worked in a variety of industries, and included silk sellers William Skinner and Sons, construction contractors W. G. Cornell, and even the offices of Starrett & van Vleck.

== Architecture ==
The Everett Building is located on a reverse-L-shaped site measuring 142 feet (43 m) along Park Avenue South and 128 feet (39 m) along 17th Street. The building has arms extending to the north and west, and a rectangular recess is located at the northwest corner of the building. It is 17 stories tall and supported by a frame of structural steel. The 17th story is located behind the cornice at the top of the 16th story, and is only visible on the northern and western sides.

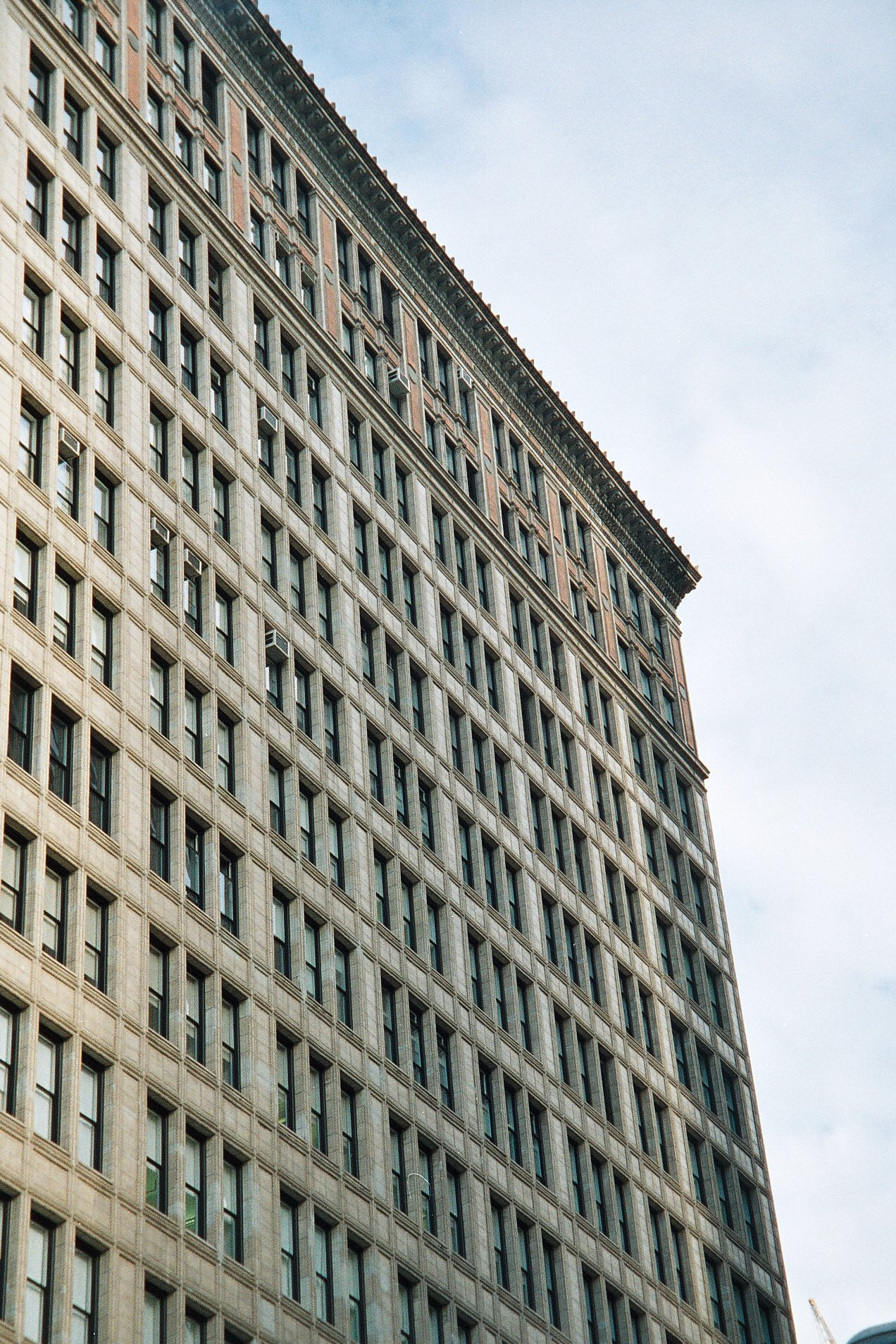
Facade, side view

When erected, the Everett Building's design was described by the Real Estate Record as being among several "strictly commercial" buildings on Park Avenue South that were "thoroughly contemporary" and built at a fast pace. Starrett & van Vleck used a grid-like pattern on the fourth through 14th floor, creating an exterior articulation depicting the structural frame inside, and thus fulfilled a key design principle of the Chicago school architectural style. The Everett Building was also one of the first buildings to use terracotta as a primary material for the entire facade, rather than a secondary undercoating or as an ornamental element.

According to critic A. C. David, the optimal building design included high ceilings and large windows to maximize natural light coverage. The Everett Building not only included these features, but also had a corner location that was conducive toward the maximization of natural light. In addition, the Everett Building's design complied with building codes and insurance companies' fireproofing stipulations, while combining several elements to cut costs, features that David described as being part of the optimal building design.

=== Facade ===
The Everett Building's facade consists primarily of white terracotta panels. There are eight vertical architectural bays facing Park Avenue South and six bays facing 17th Street. There are storefronts at ground level. Starting at the second level, most of the bays are divided into three windows, except for the second-to-northernmost bay on the Park Avenue South facade, which only has two window bays.

On the southern and eastern facades, the ground and second floors comprise the base of the building. These floors have a facade with rusticated architectural piers containing several rows of textured masonry blocks. Above the second floor is a decorated cornice with metopes and triglyphs. The facade outside the third story contains ornamented vertical piers and pilasters, with decorated capitals at their tops, and a frieze runs above the third story. The fourth through 14th stories comprise the building's vertical "shaft" section. The exterior contains raised vertical mullions on the outer edges of the piers, as well as raised horizontal spandrel beams on the outer edges of the spaces between the windows on each floor, creating a grid-like pattern. The facade of the "shaft" is topped by a belt course above the 14th floor. The 15th and 16th floors contain orange and green terracotta decoration. Rectangular orange panels are placed on the space between floors, as well as on the piers between architectural bays, while circular green panels are placed in the middle of the piers between each floor, at the midpoints between four rectangular panels. An intricately molded cornice is located above the 16th floor.

The northern and western facades consist of white buff brick with windows on the 9th through 17th floors, and have very little ornamentation.

=== History of Site ===
Everett House was a premier, 5-story 1853 hotel in New York City. Located at Union Square (4th Avenue and E 17th Street), it was named after Massachusetts Senator Edward Everett. It was demolished in 1908 and replaced by the now landmarked Everett Building

== See also ==
- List of New York City Designated Landmarks in Manhattan from 14th to 59th Streets
