= Union Square Theatre =

Off-Broadway theatre in New York City

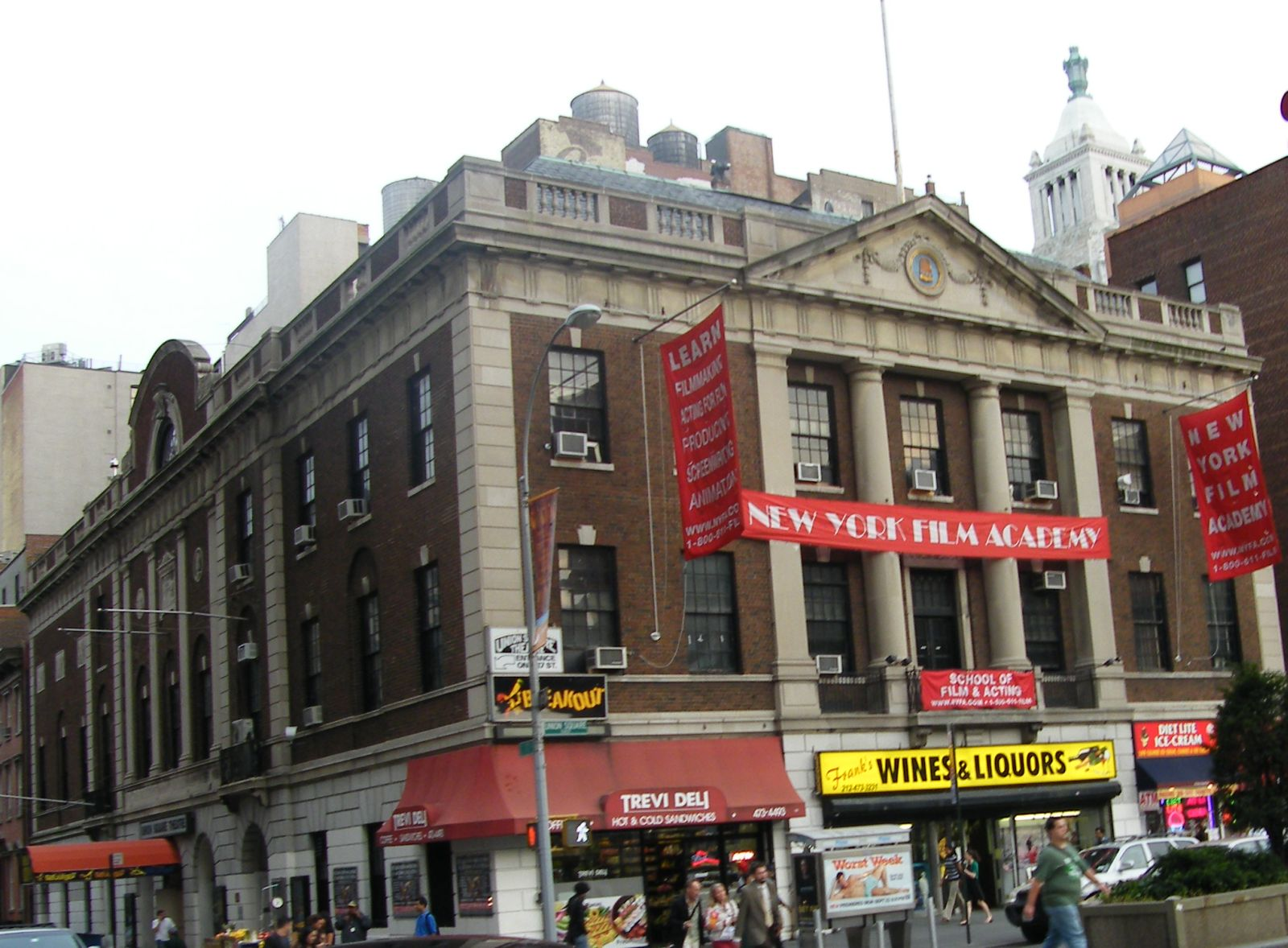
- 44 Union Square, seen in 2008; the theatre was on left side of building
- Interactive map of Union Square Theatre
- Address: 1st theatre: 58 East 14th St. 2nd theatre: 100 East 17th St. New York City
- Coordinates: 40°44′11″N 73°59′20″W
- Capacity: Unknown / 499
- Type: Broadway / Off-Broadway

Construction
- Opened: 1870 / 1985
- Closed: 1936 / January 3, 2016

Union Square Theatre was the name of two different theatres near Union Square, Manhattan, New York City. The first was a Broadway theatre that opened in 1870, was converted into a cinema in 1921 and closed in 1936. The second was an Off-Broadway theatre that opened in 1985 and closed in 2016.

== 58 East 14th Street ==
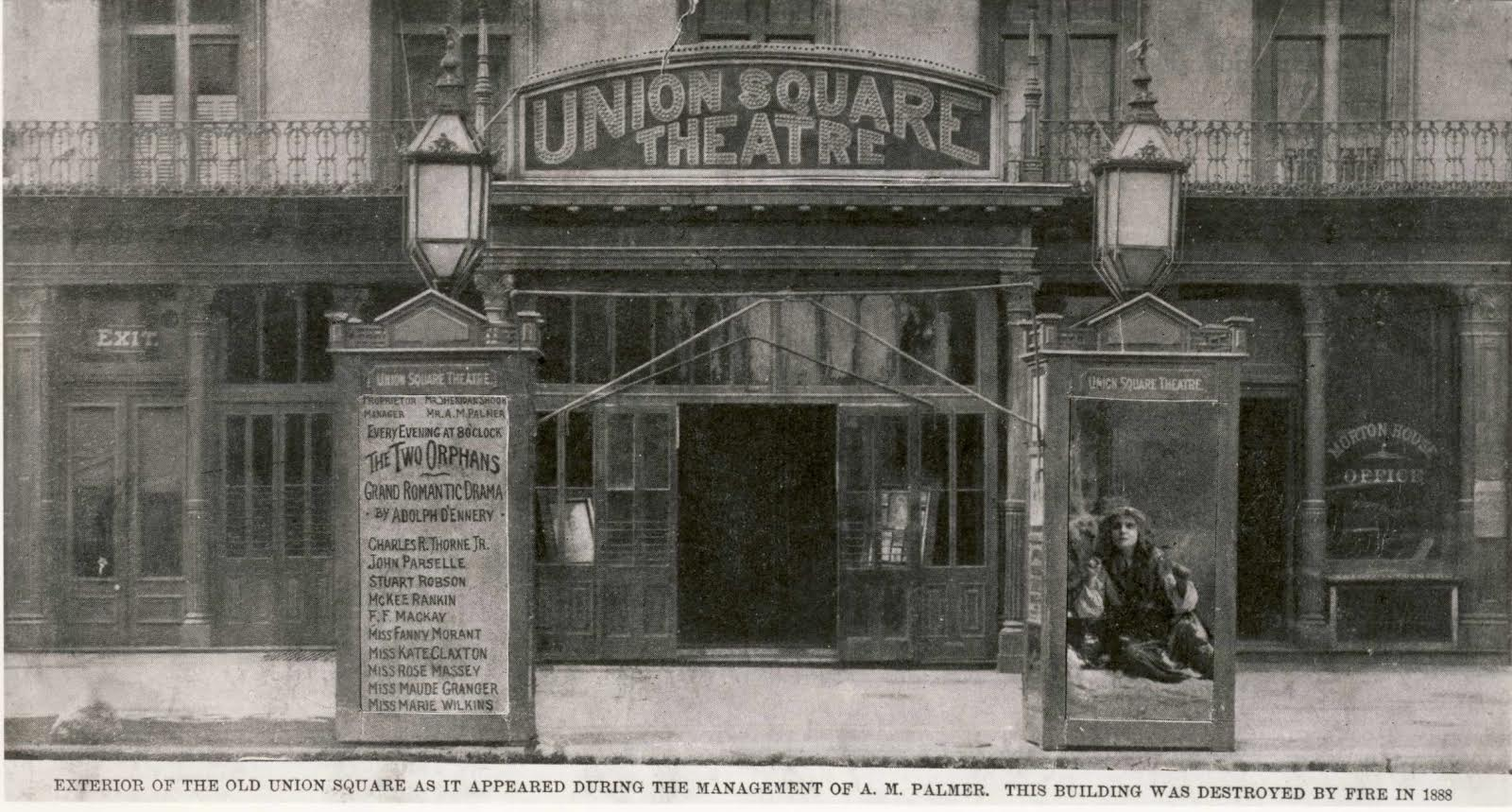
The original Union Square Theater in 1887

The first theatre with this name in New York City was located at 58 East 14th Street. It opened in 1870 and played a mixture of plays and operettas. It staged Oscar Wilde's first play, Vera; or, The Nihilists. After 1883, it hosted vaudeville as part of the B. F. Keith Circuit and Keith-Albee-Orpheum circuit. In 1921, it was renamed the Acme Theatre and converted into a cinema that eventually showed Soviet films and closed in 1936. The original structure was revealed during a November 1992 demolition of Union Square between 4th Avenue & Broadway, and was finally demolished in December. Today the site is a flagship branch of Citibank.

=== Selected productions ===
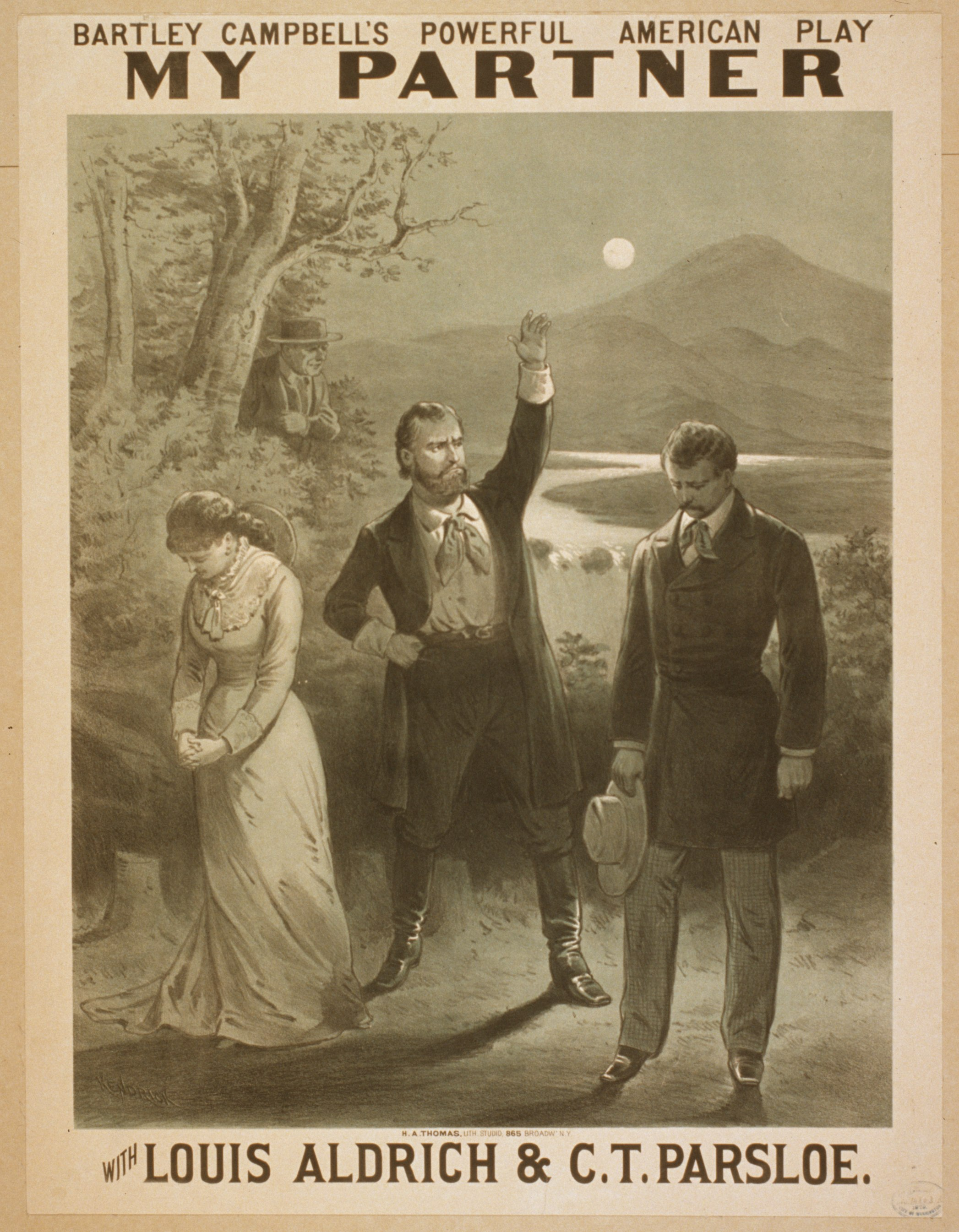
Poster for Bartley Campbell's My Partner (1879)

- Led Astray by Dion Boucicault (1873, 161 perf.)
- The Two Orphans (December 21, 1874, 180 perf.)
- Rose Michel by Steele MacKaye (December 14, 1875, over 100 perf.)
- A Celebrated Case (January 23, 1878, 111 perf.)
- The Banker's Daughter by Bronson Howard (November 30, 1878, 137 perf.)
- My Partner by Bartley Campbell (September 16, 1879, 39 perf; short run, but became a popular play)
- The Lights o' London (December 1881)
- A Parisian Romance (January 11-April 7, 1883)
- A Moral Crime (September 7, 1885)
- The Henrietta by Bronson Howard (September 26, 1887, 155 perf.)
- La Soirée (November 2013 to May 2014)

=== Notable people ===
- Jennie Kimball, actor, soubrette, theatrical manager
- Jessie Vokes, actress and dancer

== 100 East 17th Street ==
The second theatre was located at 100 East 17th Street (also known as 44 Union Square) in the former Tammany Hall building, built in 1929. It opened in 1994 and was operated by Liberty Theatres. On January 3, 2016, the theater was closed as part of a complete renovation of the building, including the planned demolition of the theatre. Its longest-running productions were Slava's Snowshow, for 28 months, and Wit, for 18 months. Its final production was The 39 Steps.

=== Selected productions ===
- The 39 Steps, April 2015–January 2016
- Murder Ballad, May 7, 2013 – July 21, 2013
- Slava's Snowshow, September 2004–January 2007
- Bat Boy: The Musical, book by Keythe Farley and Brian Flemming and music and lyrics by Laurence O'Keefe, March 2001–December 2001
- Wit, October 1998–April 2000
- The Laramie Project by Moises Kaufman and the Members of the Tectonic Theater Project, 2000
- Visiting Mr. Green by Jeff Baron, 1997–1998
- Eating Raoul, 1992

(Source: Internet Off-Broadway Database)
