= List of New York City Designated Landmarks in Manhattan =

The New York City Landmarks Preservation Commission (LPC), formed in 1965, is the New York City governmental commission that administers the city's Landmarks Preservation Law. It has designated over a thousand landmarks, classified into four categories: individual landmarks, interior landmarks, scenic landmarks, and historic districts.

The New York City borough of Manhattan contains numerous landmarks designated by the LPC, as well as seven scenic landmarks and several interior landmarks and historic districts. The following lists are split by geographical region.

- List of New York City Designated Landmarks in Manhattan below 14th Street
- List of New York City Designated Landmarks in Manhattan from 14th to 59th Streets
- List of New York City Designated Landmarks in Manhattan from 59th to 110th Streets
- List of New York City Designated Landmarks in Manhattan above 110th Street
- List of New York City Designated Landmarks in Manhattan on Islands

== See also ==
- National Register of Historic Places listings in Manhattan below 14th Street
- National Register of Historic Places listings in Manhattan from 14th to 59th Streets
- National Register of Historic Places listings in Manhattan from 59th to 110th Streets
- National Register of Historic Places listings in Manhattan above 110th Street
- National Register of Historic Places listings in Manhattan on islands
