= American art pottery =

American ceramics category

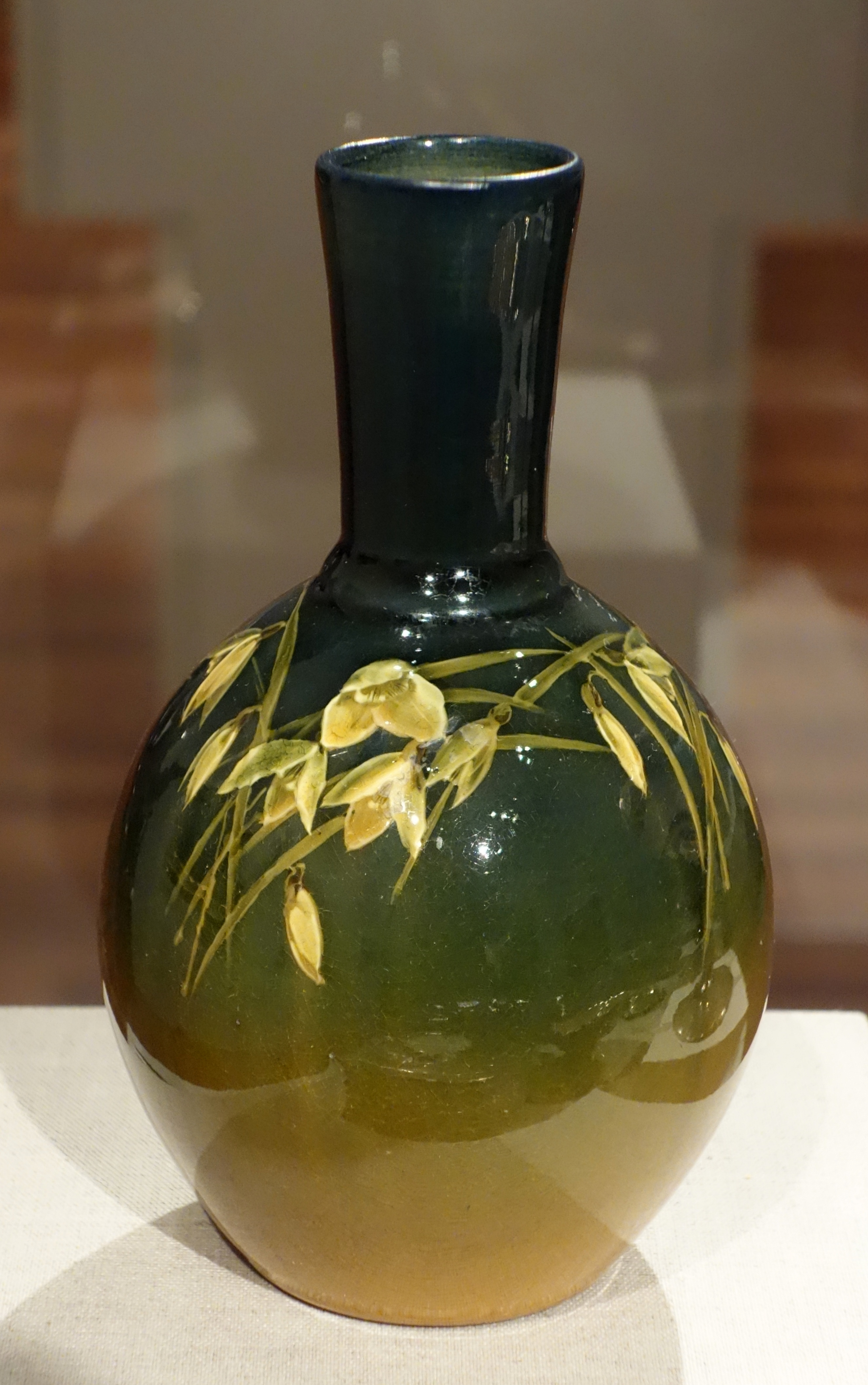
Glazed earthenware vase, Rookwood Pottery, ca. 1900

American art pottery (sometimes capitalized) refers to aesthetically distinctive hand-made ceramics in earthenware and stoneware from the period 1870-1950s. Ranging from tall vases to tiles, the work features original designs, simplified shapes, and experimental glazes and painting techniques. Stylistically, most of this work is affiliated with the modernizing Arts and Crafts (1880-1910), Art Nouveau (1890–1910), or Art Deco (1920s) movements, and also European art pottery.

Art pottery was made by some 200 studios and small factories across the country, with especially strong centers of production in Ohio (the Cowan, Lonhuda, Owens, Roseville, Rookwood, and Weller potteries) and Massachusetts (the Dedham, Grueby, Marblehead, and Paul Revere potteries). Most of the potteries were forced out of business by the economic pressures of competition from commercial mass-production companies as well as the advent of World War I followed a decade later by the Great Depression.

== History ==
The American art pottery movement is a development from a tradition of individual potters making utilitarian earthenware and stoneware vessels for local use that dates back to the Colonial period. It was shaped to differing degrees in different geographical locations by the potters' appreciation for Native American pottery traditions, the Japonism vogue, and modernist aesthetics. Influential figures in American art pottery include Frederick Hurten Rhead, who worked with several different art potteries, and Maria Longworth Nichols, whose Rookwood Pottery produced what is today considered some of the very best American art pottery.

The earliest examples of American art pottery often follow a Victorian aesthetic and feature highly detailed representational subjects such as portraits of Native Americans painted across a muted background. Later types are more likely to feature designs that are graphic, linear, and abstract, in line with the aesthetics of the Arts and Crafts, Art Nouveau, and Art Deco movements. Flowers and animals like Rookwood's eponymous rook remained popular subjects for decorations throughout the period. Some pieces have three-dimensional features, such as designs that are incised into the surface rather than painted on top, or raised elements like slip-trailed patterns or low-relief sculptures.

While many of the key figures in the movement founded or were affiliated with specific potteries, a few remained essentially independent throughout their careers. Notable in this group are John Bennett, who worked in New York and New Jersey, and Adelaïde Alsop Robineau, whose Scarab Vase is considered one of the finest examples of American art pottery. Also operating "independently" was the vast factory of Edwin Bennett in Baltimore which periodically produced fine examples of art pottery, although the overall focus of the business was industrial.

Many American museums hold collections of American art pottery. Especially large collections are at the Charles Hosmer Morse Museum of American Art, the Cooper-Hewitt Museum and the Cincinnati Art Museum, which has an entire wing dedicated to Rookwood wares.

== Notable makers of American art pottery ==
=== Arequipa ===
Arequipa pottery was produced at a tuberculosis sanatorium in the San Francisco Bay Area from 1911 to 1918. For two years (1910-1912) master potter Frederick Rhead taught there; later the potter Albert Solon taught there. Thrown and molded pots were produced, usually with a matte finish.

=== Cowan Pottery ===
The Cowan Pottery was founded in Lakewood, Ohio, in 1912 by R. Guy Cowan. It later moved to Rocky River, where it remained until driven into bankruptcy by the Great Depression. Cowan Pottery produced work in a wide range of styles influenced by the Arts and Crafts and Art Deco movements as well as by Chinese ceramics. Many Cleveland School artists worked there at one time or another, including Arthur Eugene Baggs (founder of the Marblehead Pottery) and ceramics sculptor Waylande Gregory.

=== Dedham Pottery ===
The Dedham Pottery, which operated in Dedham, Massachusetts, between 1896 and 1943, was founded by ceramicist Hugh C. Robertson, who had previously worked with his father and brothers at another pottery. Robertson was deeply interested in glazes, and he developed both an oxblood glaze (inspired by the Chinese glaze) and a fine crackle glaze, the latter of which became Dedham's signature, along with its frequent use of a crouching rabbit motif.

=== Dryden Pottery ===
Dryden Pottery was founded in Ellsworth, Kansas in 1946 by Alan James Dryden Jr. There he developed a Volcanic Ash Glaze, he created a popular pottery business with the imaginative slogan, "A Melody in Glaze."Dryden made ceramics that were considered art pottery, but also advertising materials and tourist wares. Pieces imprinted with special logos and marks were commissioned by businesses and organizations around the country. The company's signature piece is a Grecian pitcher (still being produced today), the mold form was sold to Van Briggle along with a Black Volcanic Ash glaze he developed, to supplement the company's move to Hot Springs, Arkansas in 1956. The business grew and was successful in its new location. It grew into a large factory production and was sold all over the U.S. Sheer dedication has sustained the Dryden Pottery through the boom and bust cycles that affect any industry. Currently third generation original family operated. New pieces are still created daily and new glazes are still being developed. JKDryden and Zack Dryden are currently producing many experimental one-of-a-kind Art Pottery pieces, thrown and molded wares, and utilizing the signature developed glazes and application techniques.

=== Fulper Pottery ===
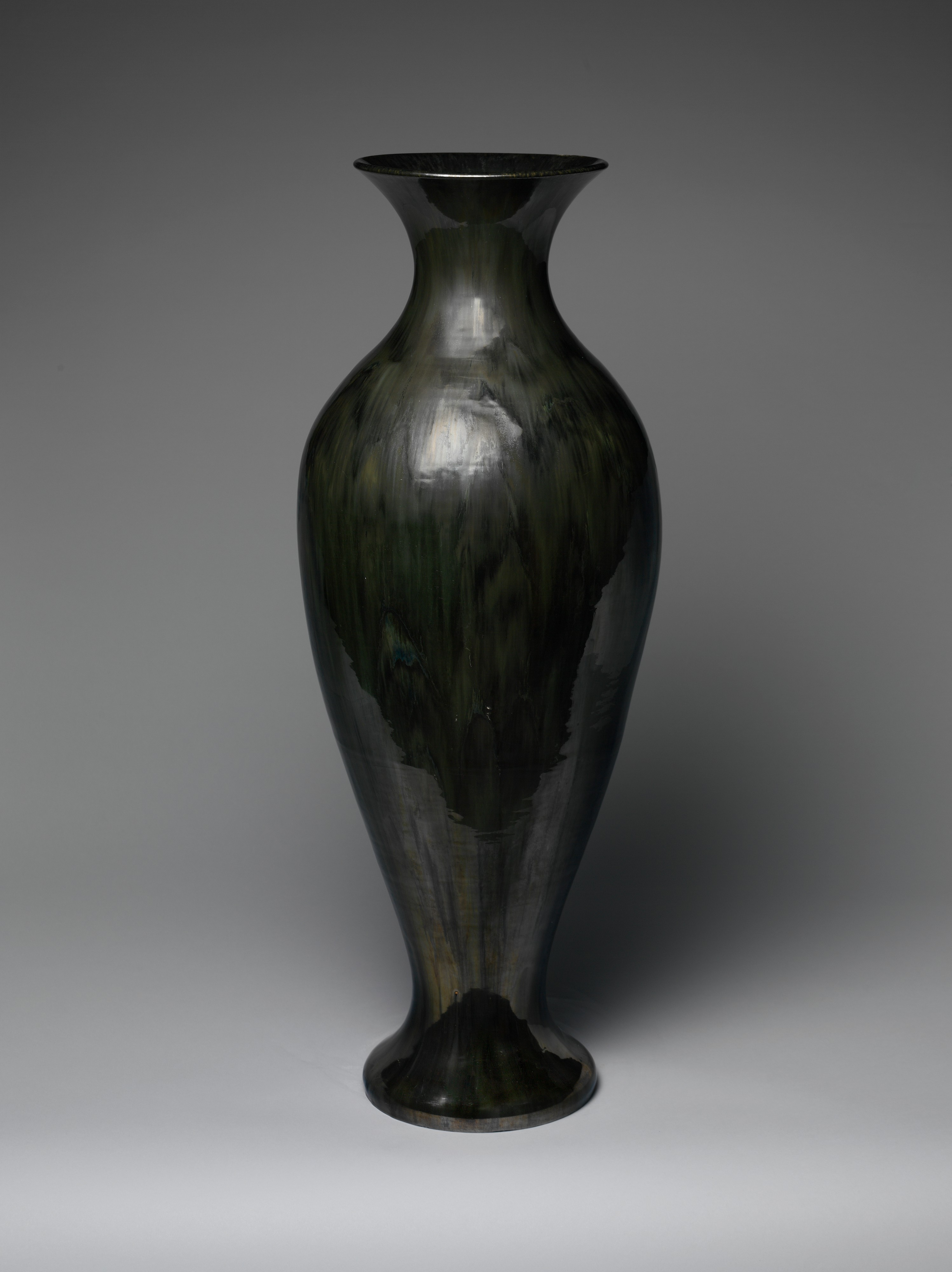
Vase by Fulper Pottery Company, ca. 1915. Metropolitan Museum of Art.

The Fulper Pottery Company, based in Flemington, New Jersey, originated in the early nineteenth century as a producer of utilitarian wares and was reorganized in 1899. Under ceramic engineer J. Martin Stangl, Fulper launched its Vasekraft line in 1909, introducing more than one hundred experimental high‑temperature glazes and a wide range of molded forms. The company became especially noted for its fully ceramic lamps and unique glazes, which received national recognition and won the Medal of Honor at the 1915 Panama‑Pacific International Exposition. Fulper’s designs reflected Asian, Classical, and Arts and Crafts influences, later shifting toward Art Deco and Moderne styles in the 1920s. The firm was reorganized as Stangl Pottery in 1934, ending the Fulper art pottery line but continuing ceramics production under the Stangl name. Fulper’s Vasekraft pieces are now represented in major museum collections and are recognized for their technical ambition and distinctive glaze program.

=== Grueby Faience Company ===
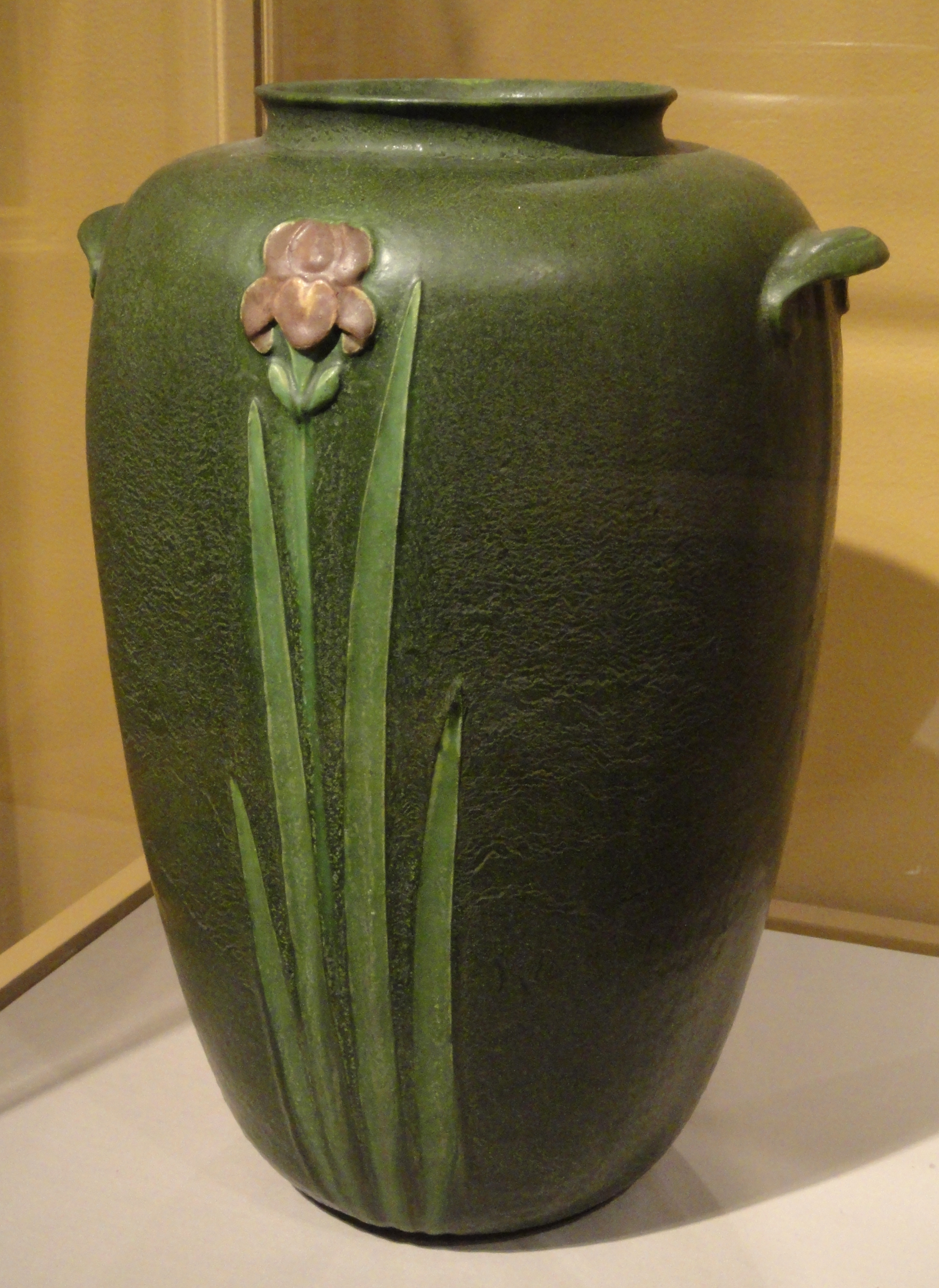
Glazed earthenware vase modeled by Annie V. Lingley, Grueby Faience Company, ca. 1901.

Founded in Revere, Massachusetts in 1894, the Grueby Faience Company produced vases and glazed architectural terra cotta and faience tiles. Grueby vases were notable for their simple shapes and a hallmark matte cucumber-green glaze. New York City's Astor Place subway stop is decorated with large Grueby tiles featuring a beaver, in honor of the fact that John Jacob Astor's fortune derived from trade in beaver pelts. The company ran into financial difficulties in the early 1900s and went out of business in 1920.

=== Lonhuda Pottery Company ===
The Lonhuda Pottery Company was founded in Steubenville, Ohio, in 1892 by William Long and closed in 1896. It became known for brown underglazes and slip decoration. The ceramicist Laura Anne Fry worked for Lonhuda in 1892–93.

=== Marblehead Pottery ===
The Marblehead Pottery was founded in Marblehead, Massachusetts in 1904 as a therapeutic program by a doctor, Herbert Hall, and taken over the following year by Arthur Eugene Baggs. The pottery's vessels are notable for simple forms and muted glazes in tones ranging from earth colors to yellow-greens and gray-blues. It closed in 1936.

=== Muncie Pottery ===
Muncie Pottery was founded in Muncie, Indiana in 1918 by the Gill brothers. They began producing arts and crafts style art pottery in 1922. Reuben Haley designed three art deco lines for the company beginning in 1926. The Rombic line utilized cubist designs, the Figural line used low relief designs, and the Spanish line used flowing organic forms. Operations ended in 1939.

=== Newcomb Pottery ===
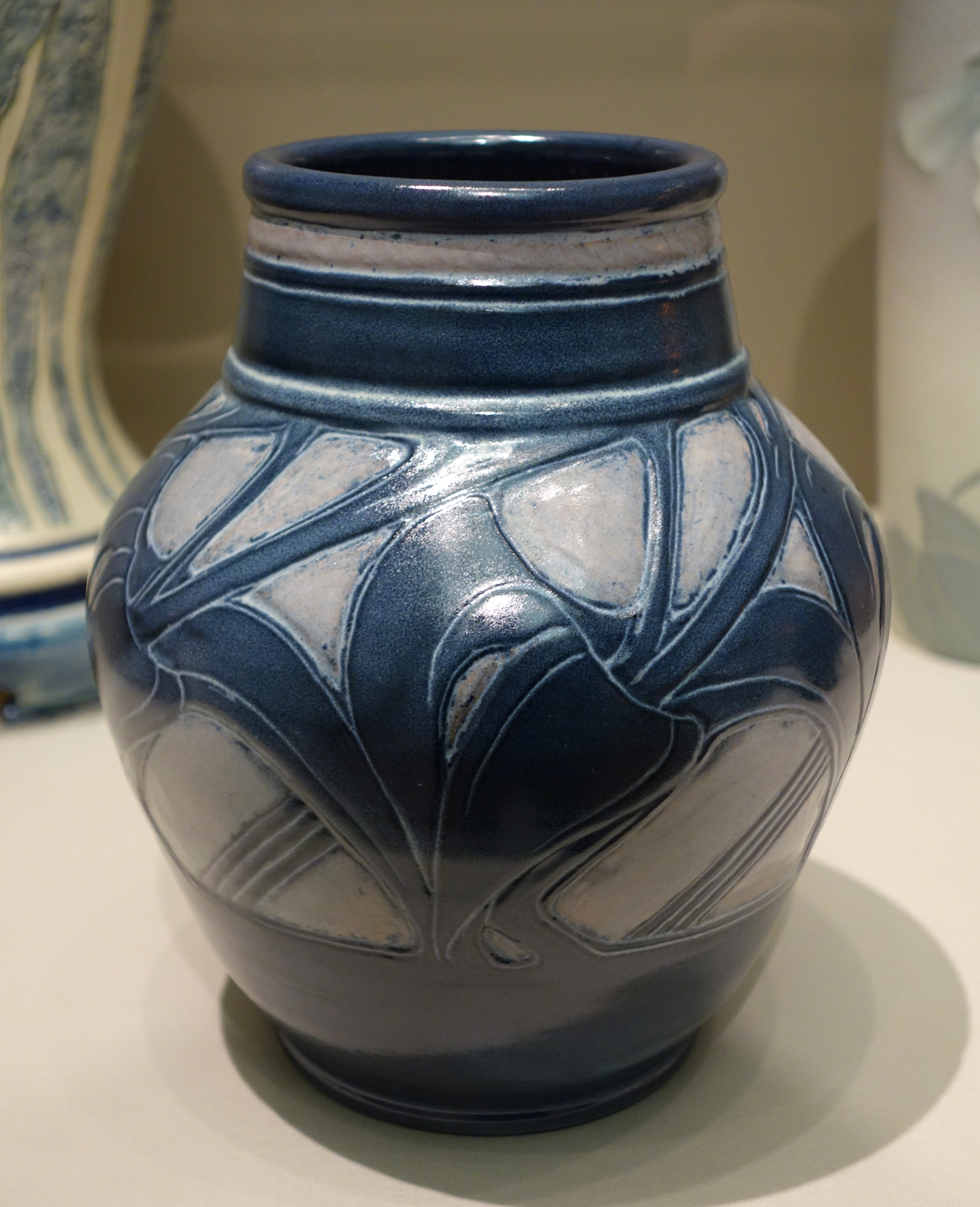
Glazed earthenware vase, Newcomb Pottery, decorated by Sadie Irvine, ca. 1910.

The Newcomb Pottery, also known as the Newcomb College Pottery, was located at H. Sophie Newcomb Memorial College in New Orleans, Louisiana, between 1895 and 1940. Vessels of various types were produced for the pottery by the college's students, who were all women. Typically these were vases with floral decorations in a strongly Art Nouveau style, often incised as well as painted and glazed.

=== Niloak Pottery ===
The Niloak Pottery was founded in Benton, Arkansas, in 1909 by master potters Charles Dean Hyten and Arthur Dovey. It was created to make art pottery It was manufactures first by the Eagle Pottery Company, a major producer of domestic ware or utilitarian wares. The name is the reverse spelling of the word kaolin, an important component of the local clay. Niloak became known for its "Mission Swirl tor Swirled Middionware, a multicolored pattern resembling marbled paper made by mixing colored clays together. Typically the Mission Swirl displays a mix of tan, red-brown, and blue-gray colors. Arthur Dovey, who previously worked for Rookwood Pottery, is credited with inventing the swirl concept.

Swirled Missionware is an oddity within the American ceramic industry.

Niloak was successful until the Great Depression put sales into a slump. As a result, Hywood changed manufacturing methods and introduced the Hywood Art Pottery. Financially challenged, it went out of business in 1947.

=== Owens Pottery ===
The J. B. Owens Pottery Company was founded in Roseville, Ohio, in 1885 by J. B. Owens. After moving to Zanesville, it produced art pottery from 1896 to around 1910, after which Owens concentrated on manufacturing tiles instead. Owens Pottery produced around four dozen different lines, mainly of vase, bowls, and pitchers. Distinctive lines include Utopian (brown glazed, often with botanical decoration), Matte Green (featuring stylized designs under a matte green glaze), and Mission (featuring Spanish missions).

=== Paul Revere Pottery ===
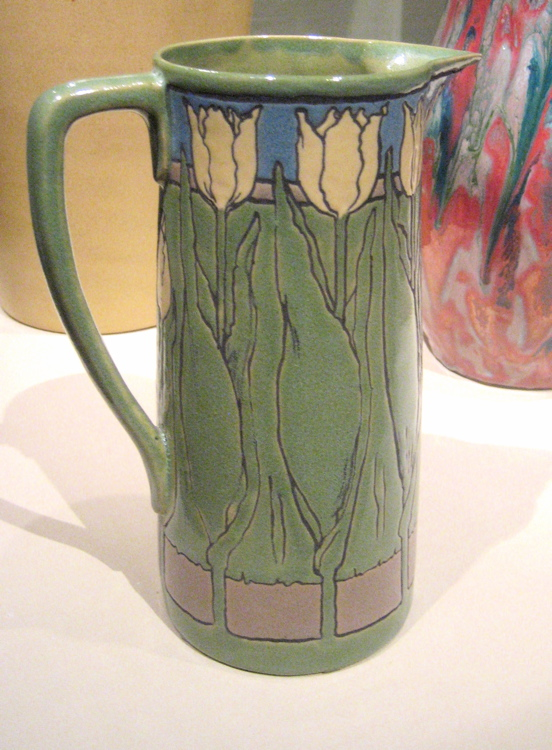
Pitcher with incised decoration, Paul Revere Pottery, 1914.

The Paul Revere Pottery was founded in Boston in 1908 by Helen Storrow, Edith Guerrier, and Edith Brown to provide employment and skills to young women. It grew in part out of a reading group formed by Guerrier, the Saturday Evening Girls club, and it was managed entirely by the club members. For this reason the Paul Revere Pottery is sometimes referred to as the Saturday Girls. It lasted up to World War I. The pottery produced vessels with floral and animal motifs in a highly simplified graphic style, with matte or low-luster glazes predominantly in tones of green, blue, ochre, and brown.

=== Pewabic Pottery ===
Pewabic Pottery was founded in Detroit in 1903 by Mary Chase Perry Stratton and Horace James Caulkins. The pair began the company by creating objects for everyday use that also utilized interesting glazes, which Perry Stratton developed. The company became well known for iridescent glazes, which were developed in 1906. Later, the pottery would go on to produce tile installations for notable buildings in Detroit such as the Guardian Building, The Detroit Institute of Arts, and the Detroit Public Library. The pottery has never ceased operations and is still a functioning studio and gallery.

=== Rookwood Pottery Company ===
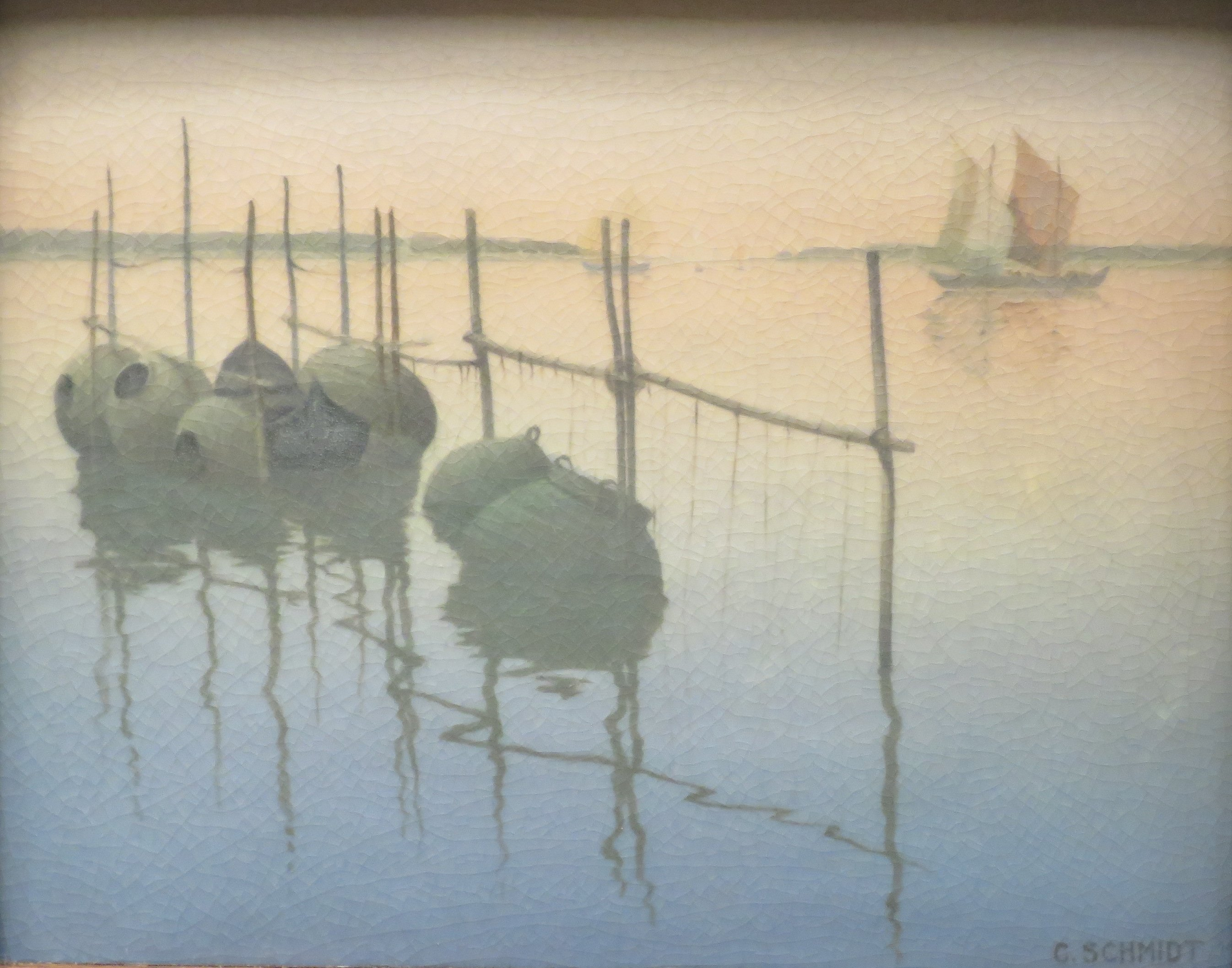
Ceramic plaque with semi-transparent 'vellum' glaze, decorated by Carl Schmidt, Rookwood Pottery, 1912.

The Rookwood Pottery Company was founded in Cincinnati, Ohio, in 1880 by Maria Longworth Nichols Storer, who was influenced by Japanese and French ceramics. Rookwood was known for experimenting with glazes and for the exceptionally high quality of the painted and incised work. Among the potters and ceramic painters who worked there were Kitaro Shirayamadani, Clara Chipman Newton, Laura Anne Fry, and Arthur Dovey (who moved on to work at Niloak Pottery). The company was badly affected by the Great Depression and declared bankruptcy in 1941. It reopened in 1959 in Mississippi and struggled through various ownerships for several decades. In the early 2000s it moved back to Cincinnati, where it now operates.

=== Roseville Pottery ===
Pinecone bowl with raised decoration, Roseville Pottery, n.d.

The Roseville Pottery was founded in Roseville, Ohio, in 1890 and moved to Zanesville eight years later. It began by making housewares and only began making art pottery around 1900. Frederick Rhead was Roseville's art director for five years (1904–09). Many Roseville pots carry floral decoration, frequently in low relief. Roseville ceased producing original art pottery in 1953.

=== Teco Pottery ===
The Teco Pottery was founded in Terra Cotta, Illinois, in 1899 by William Day Gates, as a specialty branch of his American Terra Cotta Tile and Ceramic Company, which made architectural terra cotta items like drain tiles and chimney tops. Gates's experiments with glazes and forms led him to found Teco (an acronym for TErra COtta) to create art pottery, especially vases. Teco became known for its distinctive architecturally styled wares with little to no surface decoration and for a medium-green matte glaze. Most designs were the work of Gates himself, but a few Chicago-based Prairie School architects also made works for Teco. Gates's ceramics business closed as a result of the stock market crash of 1929 and ensuing Great Depression, taking Teco Pottery down with it.

=== Van Briggle Pottery ===
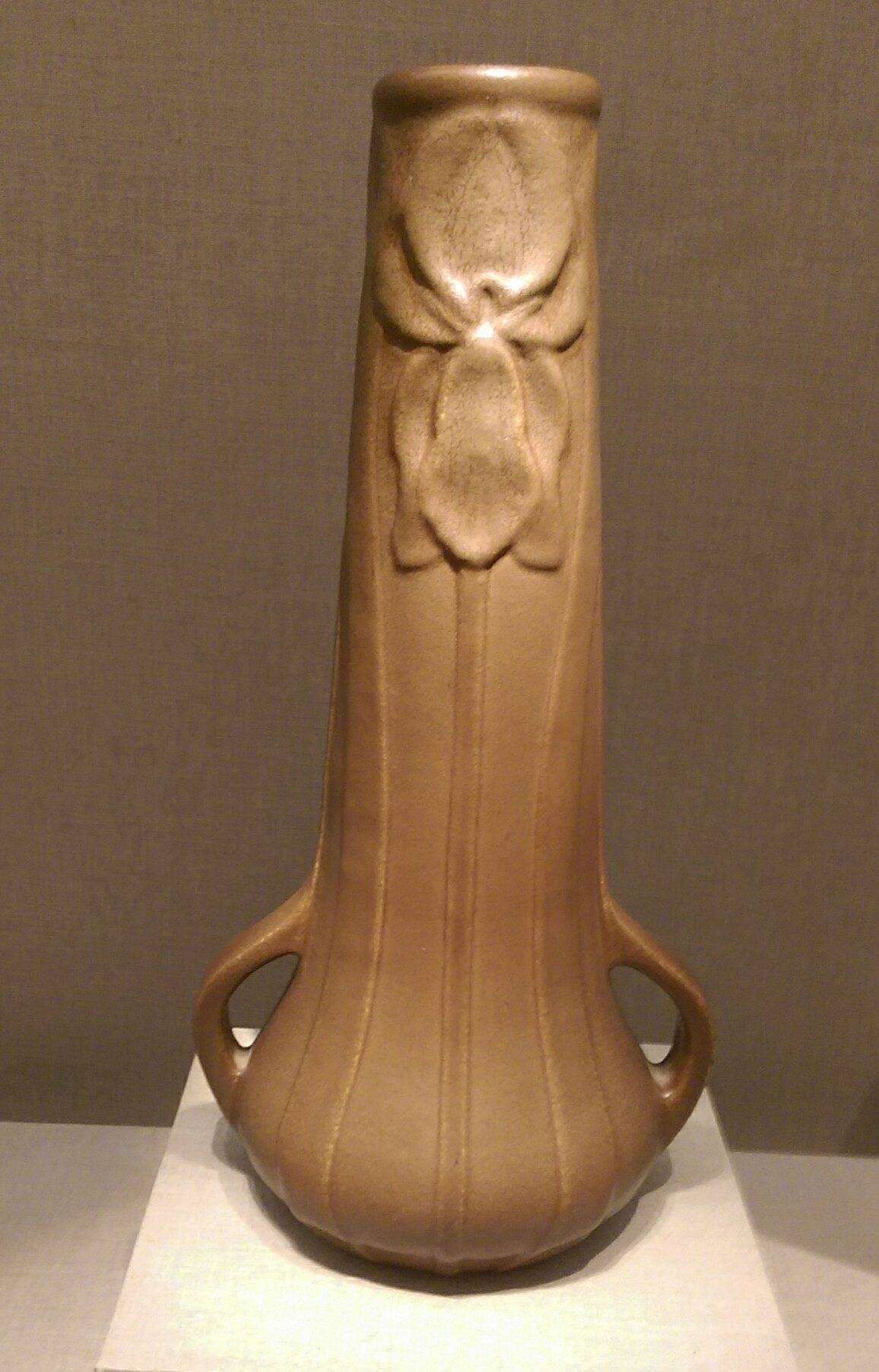
Vase decorated with iris, made by Artus Van Briggle for Van Briggle Pottery, ca. 1903.

The Van Briggle Pottery was founded in Colorado Springs, Colorado, in 1901 by Artus and Anne Van Briggle. The pottery favored the Art Nouveau style. It is still operating today, making it the oldest continuously operating art pottery in the United States.

=== Weller Pottery ===
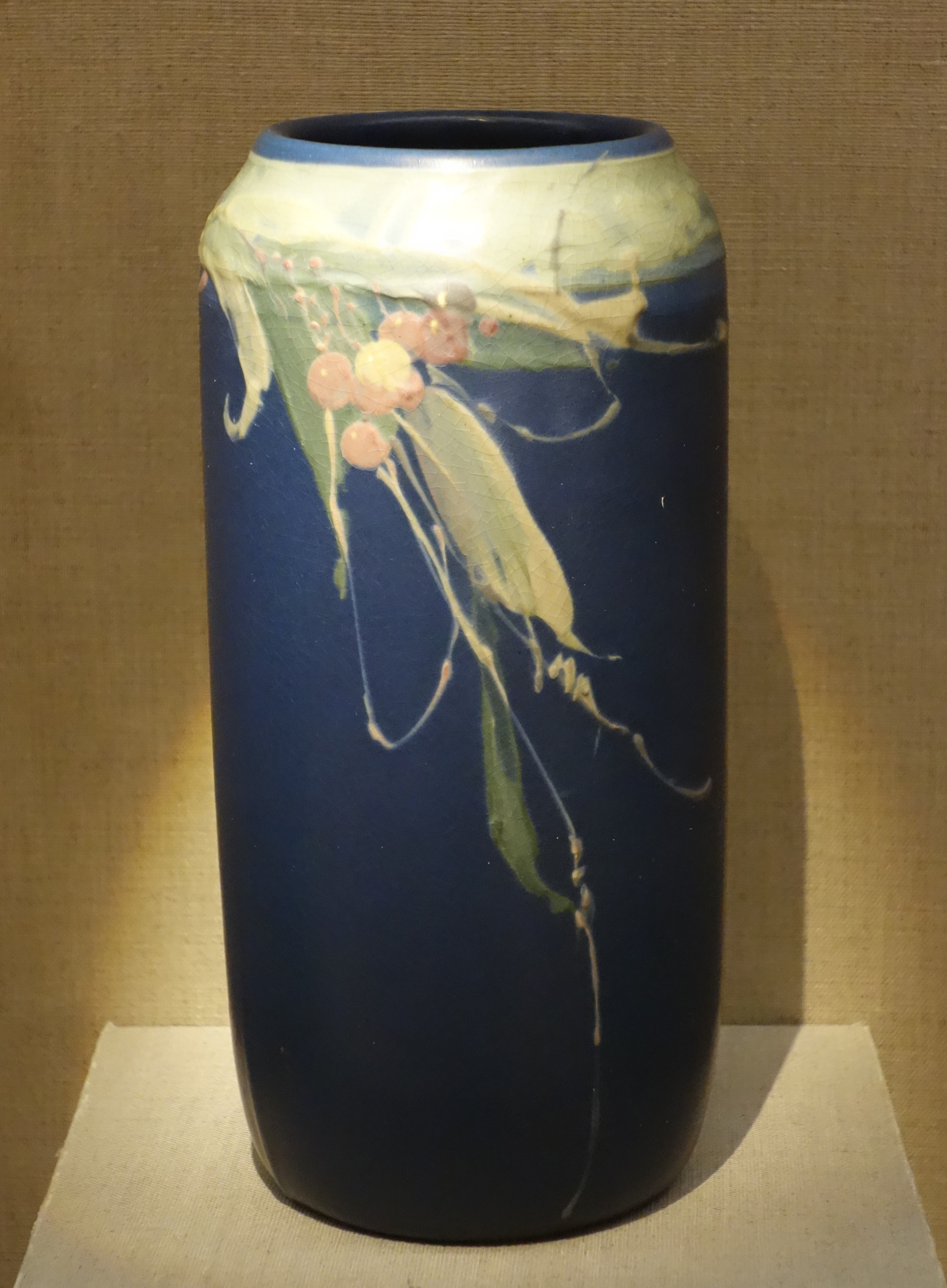
Glazed earthenware vase, Weller Pottery, ca. 1905.

Potter Samuel A. Weller founded the Weller Pottery in Fultonham, Ohio, in 1872. The company turned out both art pottery and mass-produced work, becoming the largest pottery in the country by 1905. Many different potters worked at Weller over the years, including Frederick Rhead, who was there in 1903–04. For this reason, it has less of a signature style than some of the smaller art potteries. It closed in 1948.

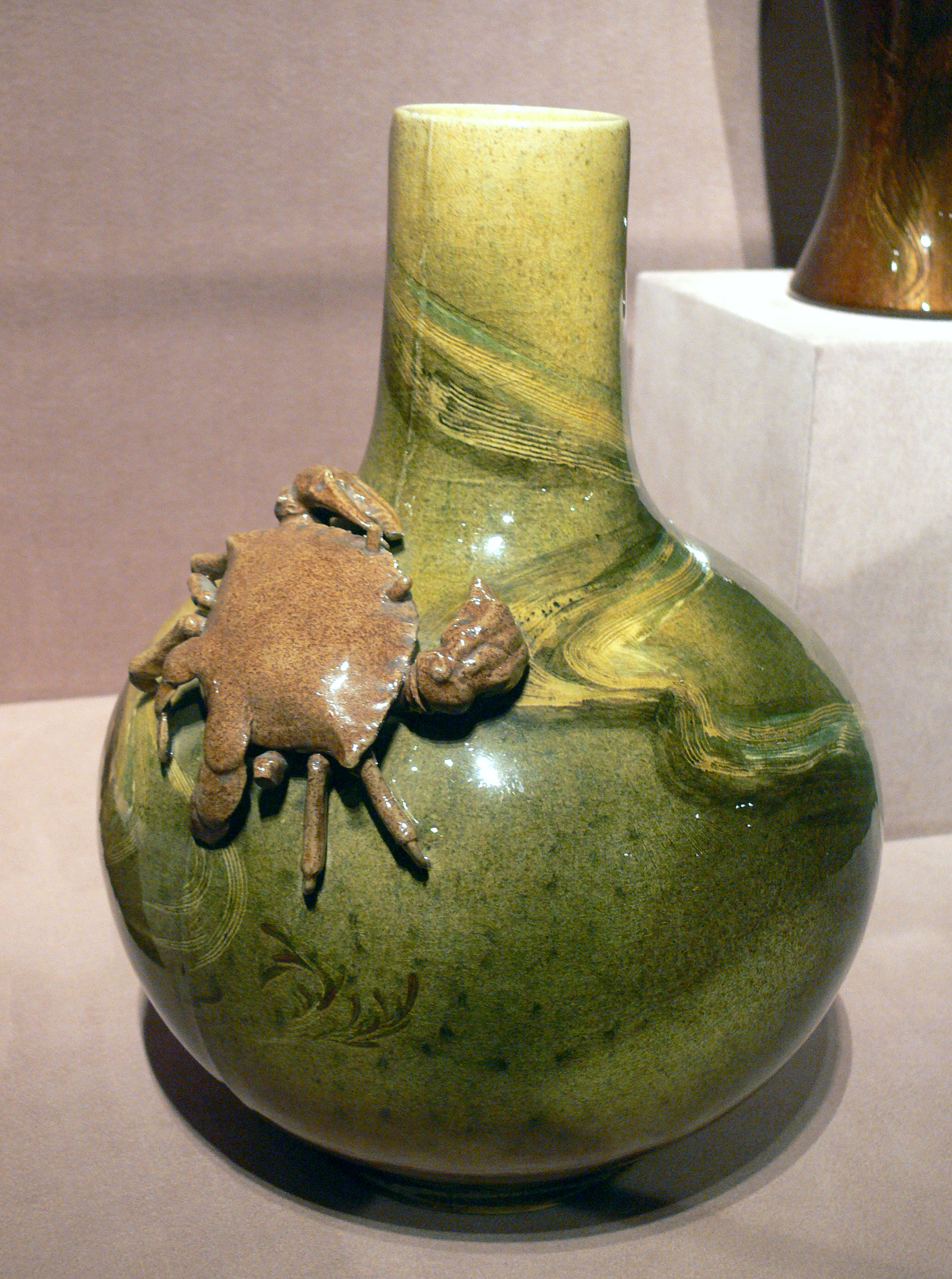
Vase with raised decoration, Rookwood Pottery, 1885.
