= Samuel A. Weller =

American businessman

Samuel Augustus Weller
- Born: April 12, 1851; Muskingum County, Ohio
- Died: October 4, 1925 (aged 74); Washington, D.C.
- Resting place: Woodlawn Cemetery, Zanesville, Ohio
- Occupation: Businessman
- Known for: Founder and owner S.A. Weller Pottery

Samuel Augustus Weller (April 12, 1851 – October 4, 1925), one of the pioneer pottery manufacturers of Ohio in the United States, founded the S.A. Weller Pottery in Fultonham, Ohio, in 1872. In 1882 he moved the business to Zanesville, Ohio, and for more than a half-century Weller Pottery produced both utilitarian pieces and more decorative art pottery lines.

== Early life and career ==
Samuel Augustus Weller, born in Muskingum County, Ohio, was the fourth of nine children of Jacob Weller (1816−1871) and Mary (née Fulton) Weller (1826−1914). Weller married Herminnie C. Pickens (1862−1954) on January 11, 1885, in Muskingum County, Ohio. The couple had two daughters, Louise, born in 1896, and Ethel, born in 1898.

As a young man, Weller worked in the Bluebird Pottery, a local Muskingum ceramics factory, and by 1872 had established his own factory (a log cabin and a single kiln) in Fultonham, Ohio. Using a kickwheel, he turned stoneware jars and clay flower pots on a small scale, and sold these utilitarian pieces door-to-door. One of his earliest designs combined common sewer tiles to make a milk pan, which he marketed successfully locally.

Because Weller was both a potter and a talented salesman, his business prospered. He had an old white horse that pulled loads of crude red clay, dug from local hills, to his shop. The horse also propelled a grinding machine to prepare clay and pulled a dilapidated wagon carrying finished products to market. By 1882 Weller moved his pottery to Zanesville, at the foot of Pierce Street along the river, and began creating more decorative wares.

Weller expanded in 1888 with purchase of a wareroom, and again in 1890, buying a tract in the Putnam district, along Pierce Street near the railway, and erecting there a large three-story plant to accommodate his 68 employees.

== Acquisition of Lonhuda Pottery ==
In 1893 Weller attended the Chicago World's Fair, where he saw a line of decorative art pottery developed by a competitor, Lonhuda Pottery of Steubenville, Ohio. The name "Lonhuda" was a combination of the first letters of three partners' surnames: William A. Long, who had been a Steubenville druggist; and two investors, W.H Hunter, editor of the Steubenville Daily Gazette, and Alfred Day, secretary of the United States Potters Association. Long had based his high-gloss brown slip faience glaze on a process Laura A. Fry invented in 1886 at the Rookwood Pottery. Her process involved applying uniform background glazes with an atomizer, giving more possibilities for even shading. Fry patented this process by 1889, and she joined Long at the Lonhuda Pottery in 1892.

After Weller saw the Lonhuda products, he joined forces with Long in 1893, and they moved the Lonhuda pottery to Zanesville by 1895. Unfortunately, many of Weller's relationships with designers were short-lived — Long left Weller's employ after only a year. One source suggests that the cause of the break could have been "personality conflict...financial disagreements...or Long may have simply outgrown his usefulness to Weller", but the reasons for Long's departure are unknown. Weller copied and renamed Long's faience glazed pottery as Weller Pottery's "Louwelsa" line, after his daughter Louise and himself. That Lonhuda factory burned down on May 10, 1895, and Weller rebuilt a larger factory immediately, employing between 500 and 600 people.

== Art pottery and commercial lines ==
Called a "scalawag" by some critics for stealing other designers' ideas, Weller is said to have committed "the deplorable act of absconding with other people’s ideas and selling them as his own". However, there is not a consensus, according to one modern critic: "..some might call [Weller] an entrepreneur, while others would judge him to be something of an opportunistic scoundrel". Weller hired a series of talented designers and potters and profited from their work.

Charles Babcock Upjohn worked for him from 1885–1904, with the first and second Dickens lines, as well as Eocean and Corleone lines. The Dickens lines were copied from a very successful line of figurines produced by Doulton of England, based on Charles Dickens characters. Weller was amused that Sam Weller was also the name of a servant in the Pickwick Papers. He is reported to have declared, "If Dickens can create a character named Sam Weller, the least I can do is reciprocate and name a line for Dickens."

From 1898–1900 Weller employed Albert Radford, who is credited with developing Weller Matt ware.

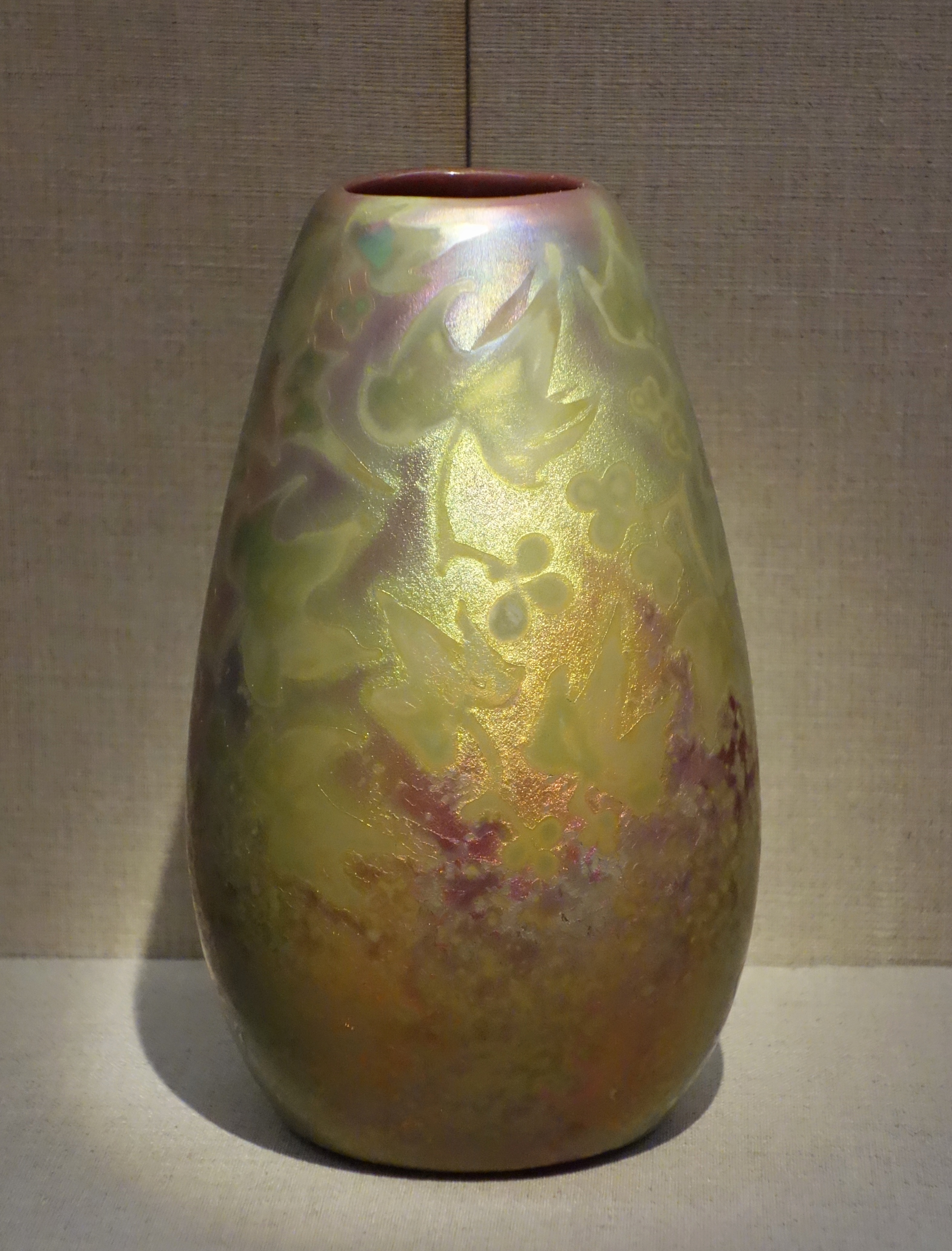
Vase by Jacques Sicard, Weller Pottery, Zanesville, Ohio, c. 1903-1907, glazed earthenware - De Young Museum - DSC00760

Jacques Sicard and Henri Gellie designed artware for Weller from 1901–1907; they kept their processes secret from Weller for making the Sicardo line of metallic luster glazing (called Reflets Metalliques). According to one source, "the professional and personal relationship between Weller and Sicard was turbulent."

Frederick Hurten Rhead worked for Weller from mid-1903–1904, with the Jap Birdimal line, the L'Art Nouveau line, and the third Dickens line.

Weller realized there was "more prestige than profit" in the art pottery lines that required hand decorating. He continued to produce some fine art wares after 1910, up until the beginning of the World War I era, when the Weller Pottery turned to commercial art wares. These wares were cheaper to produce because they were molded, with few artistic additions.

In the second decade of the century, Rudolph Lorber, who worked for Weller Pottery from 1905–1930, molded many profitable lines, including "Roma, Flemish, Zona, Forest, Muskota, Knifewood, and Ting".

In 1920 the old Zanesville Art Pottery became Weller's "Plant #3", securing the claim that S.A. Weller Pottery was the largest in the country.

== Weller Theatre ==
Samuel Weller had other business interests, including real estate, banking and other financial investments. He and a local contractor named Bill Adams constructed a theatre in Zanesville that was hailed as "the most renowned in the country" for its acoustics and beautiful interior decorations. The theatre "was elaborately decorated, including a huge stage drop curtain designed and painted by Cincinnati artist John Rettig. George M. Cohan, Victor Herbert, and Ignace Paderewski all performed in the historic theatre and Broadway plays and operas were also presented." It opened on April 27, 1903, with floor seating for 1,700 people and six boxes; it closed in 1958, more than three decades after Weller died.

== Later life ==
Weller was director of the Old Citizens National Bank, a member of the Grace M. E. church and was affiliated with the B.P.O. Elks, the Zane club and the Zanesville Golf club. He was rated as a millionaire.

Weller suffered a paralyzing stroke while on a business trip to Washington, D.C., and died there three weeks later, October 4, 1925. He was interred in the mausoleum at Woodlawn cemetery in Zanesville.

In 1954, Samuel’s wife Minnie Weller died at age 92, and his Weller house contents were auctioned.

== See also ==
- Arts and Crafts movement
- Ceramic art
- Decorative arts
- Weller Pottery
