= Weller Pottery =

Defunct pottery manufacturer

S. A. Weller Pottery, Inc.
- Company type: Corporation
- Founded: 1872 in Fultonham, Ohio, United States
- Founder: Samuel A. Weller
- Defunct: 1948
- Headquarters: Zanesville, Ohio
- Products: Vases, pots, ceramic tile, cuspidors, bowls, crocks

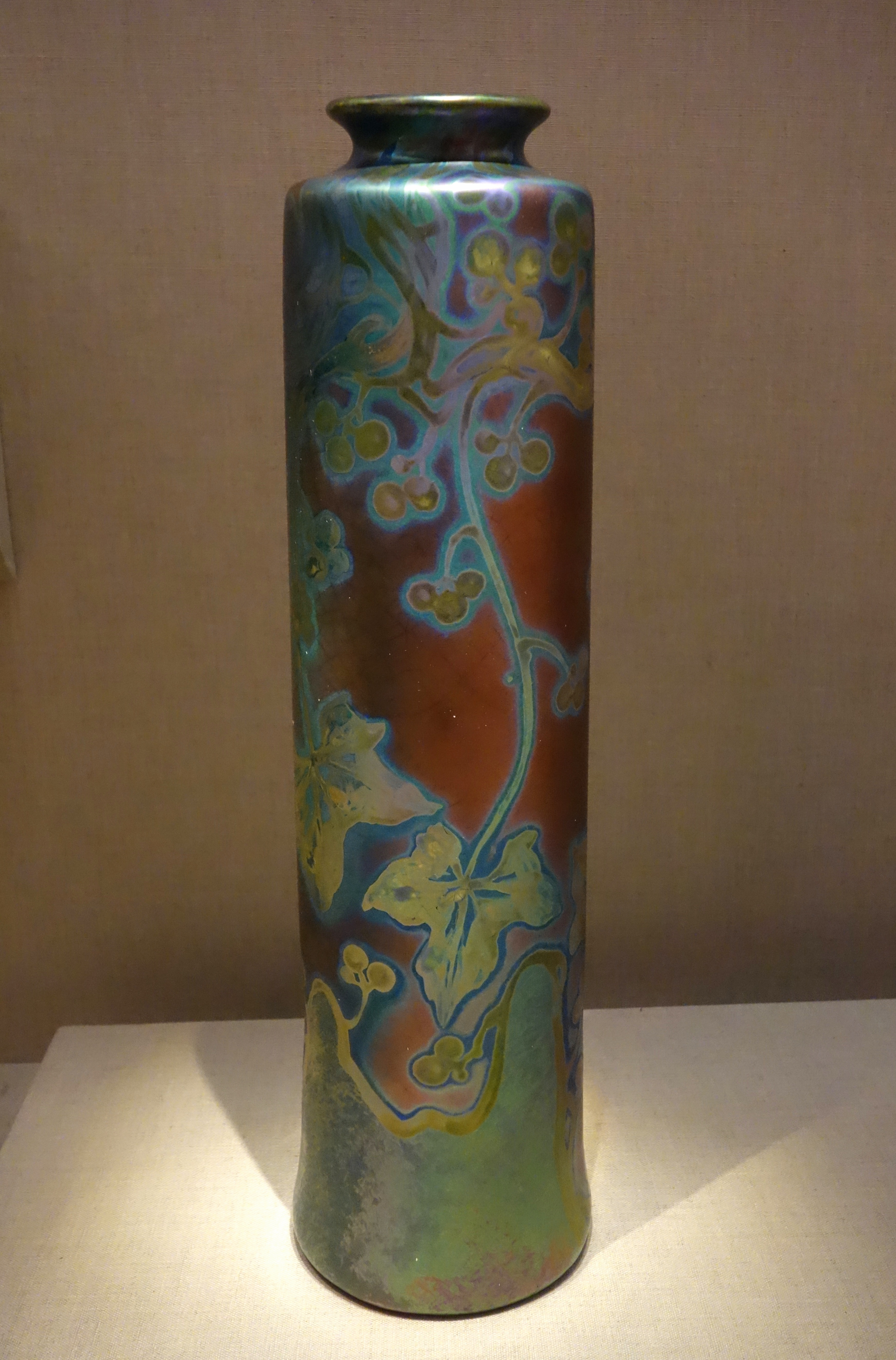
Vase by Jacques Sicard, c. 1903-1907

In 1872, Samuel A. Weller founded Weller Pottery in Fultonham, Ohio, United States. Originally, his business consisted of a small cabin and one beehive kiln, and Weller produced flower pots, bowls, crocks, and vases. By 1905, Weller Pottery was the largest pottery in the country. It mass-produced art pottery until about 1920, and it produced commercial lines until the pottery closed in 1948.

== Early period, 1872−1910 ==
In 1872, when Samuel A. Weller (1851−1925) was 21, he established and operated a one-man pottery in Fultonham in Muskingum County, Ohio. Between 1882−1890, he had expanded to Zanesville, with a factory on Pierce Street along the river. In 1893 he saw William Long's Lonhuda ware at the Chicago World's Fair, and Long joined Weller to produce this faience-glazed pottery line. When Long left Weller's employ after less than a year, Weller renamed the faience line Louwelsa after his daughter Louisa, who had been born in 1896.

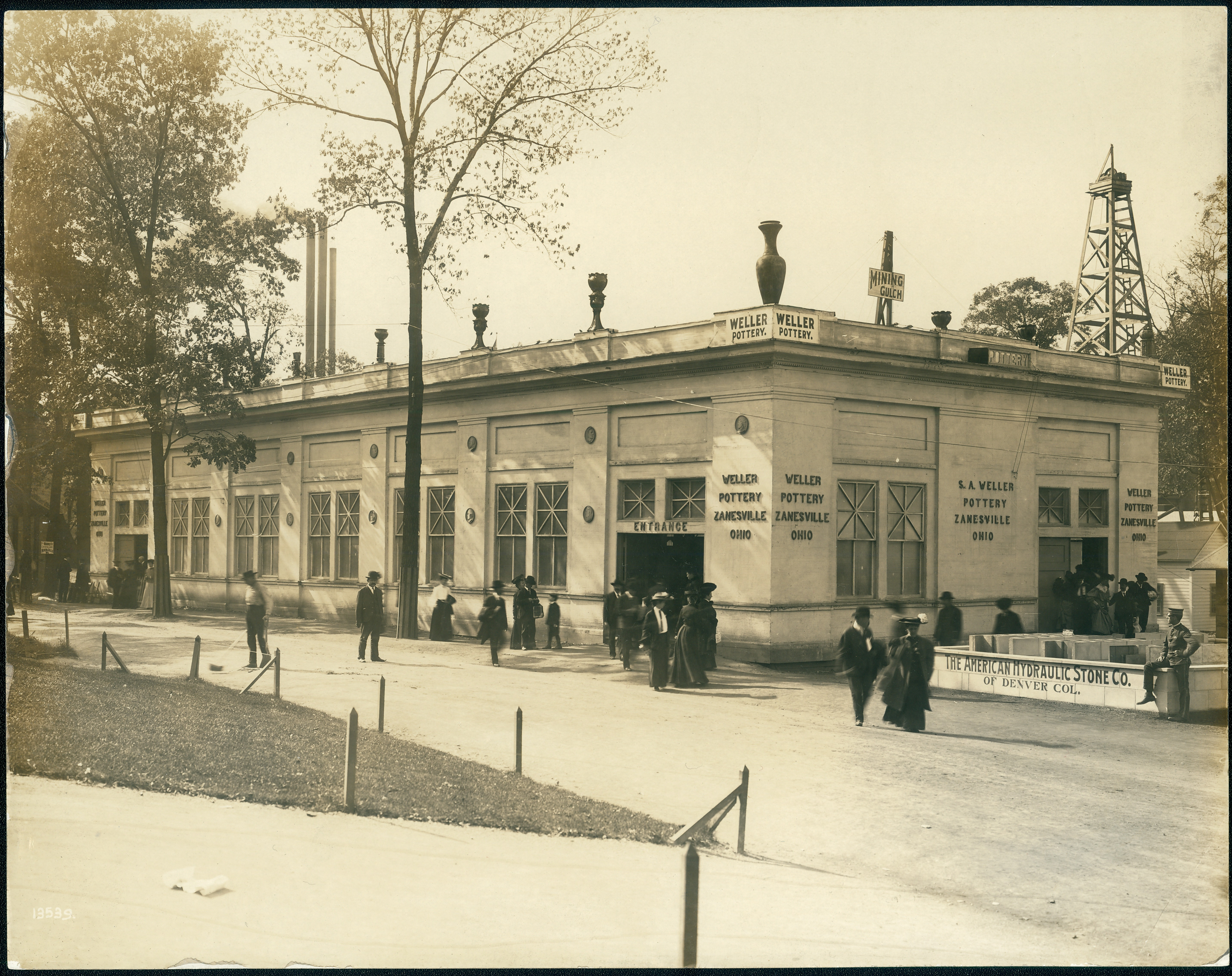
Weller Pottery building at the 1904 World's Fair

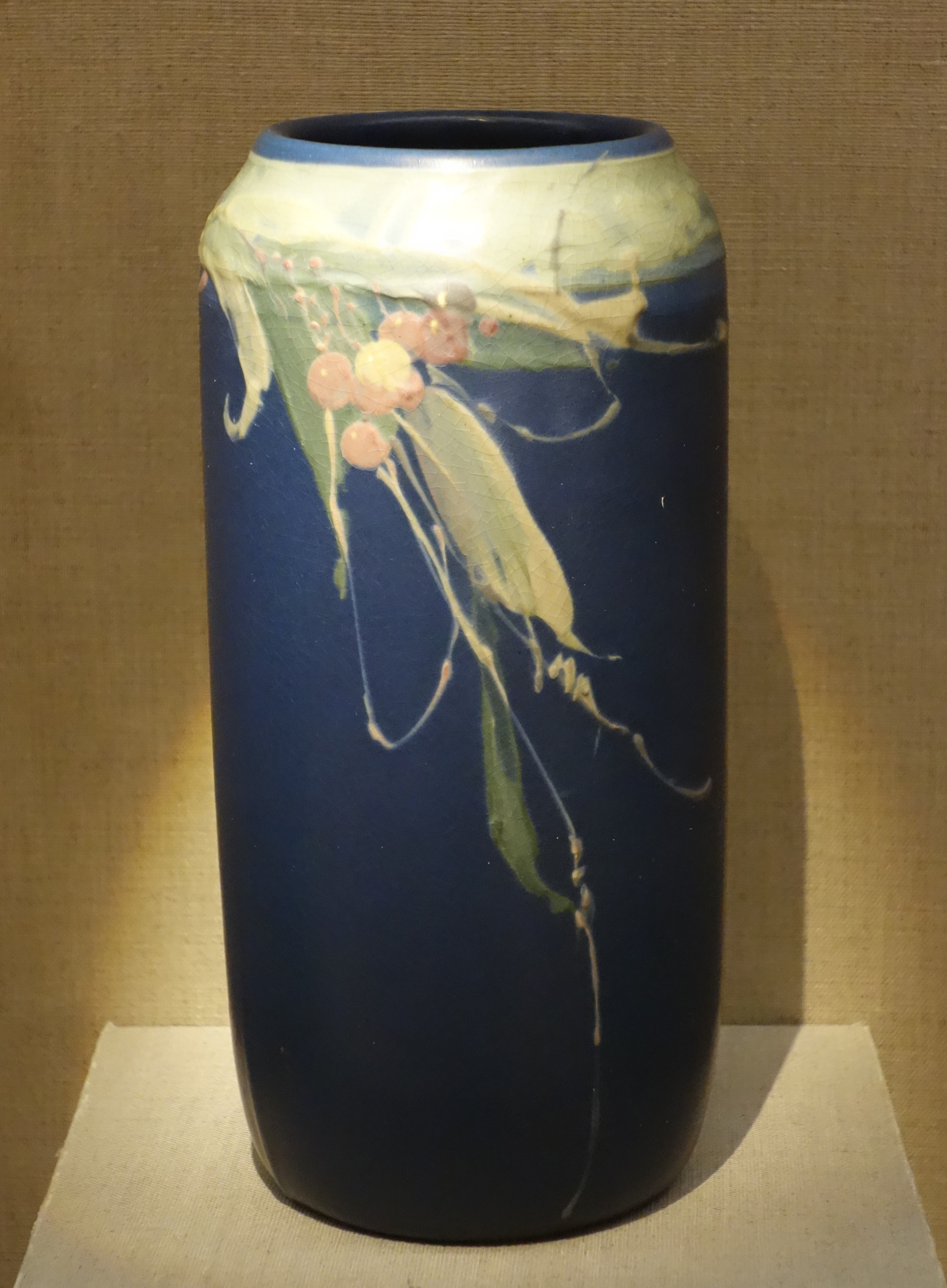
Vase, Weller Pottery, Zanesville, Ohio, c. 1905, glazed earthenware

From 1895−1904, Charles Babcock Upjohn was Weller's head designer, developing the Dickensware I, Dickensware II, Eocean and Corleone lines.

By 1897, Henry Schmidt designed Weller's Turada line, the first "squeeze-bag" pottery line in the Ohio valley. Decorators used squeeze-bags like cake decorators, squeezing the paint onto the ceramic rather than painting it on with brushes.

From 1902−1907, Jacques Sicard and Henri Gellie worked at Weller's pottery to develop a metallic glaze, which had been introduced by Clement Massier in France by 1889, as Reflets Metalliques. The Sicardo line went into production in the fall of 1903, but the process was difficult, and only about 30% of the finished pots were marketable.

In this same period, between 1902 and 1905, Weller had become the world's largest pottery and mass-producer of art pottery. In 1903 and 1904, Frederick Hurten Rhead worked for a short time at Weller Pottery, developing Jap Birdimal line in 1904. He left in 1904 to become Roseville Pottery's first art director, and later designed the very popular Fiesta line for Homer Laughlin China Company.

At the St. Louis Exposition in 1904, Weller had huge display, including a 7.5 ft (2.3 m) vase, and a working studio, complete with a kiln.

In 1908, Rudolph Lorber developed Dechiwo, which led to Burntwood, Claywood, and other similar lines.

=== Early Weller art ware lines ===
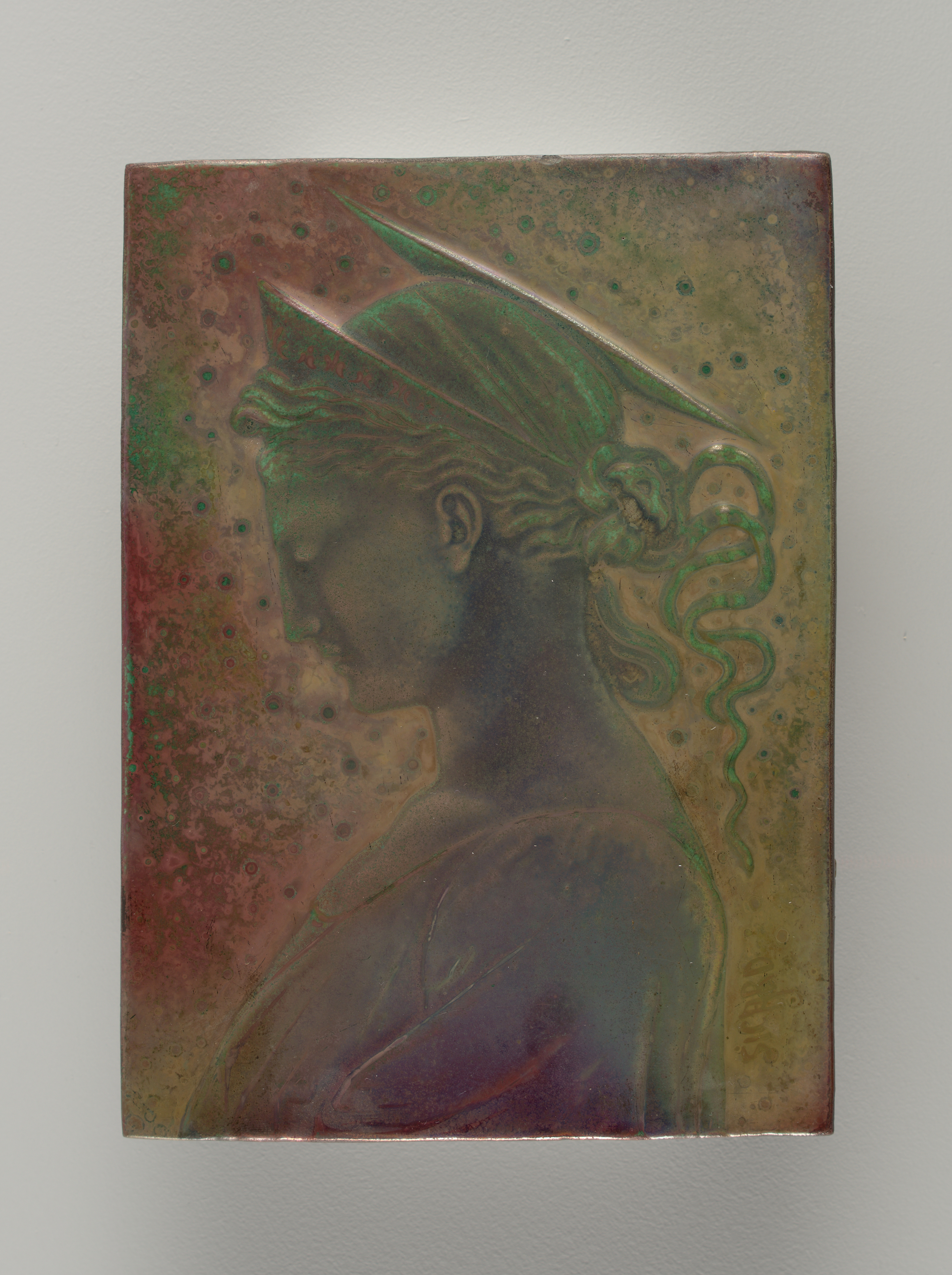
Portrait Plaque, 1902–07, "Molded red earthenware body modeled in low relief with a Pre-Raphaelitesque left profile of a woman ... Decoration of metallic lustres on an iridescent ground, predominately in shades of purple and green."

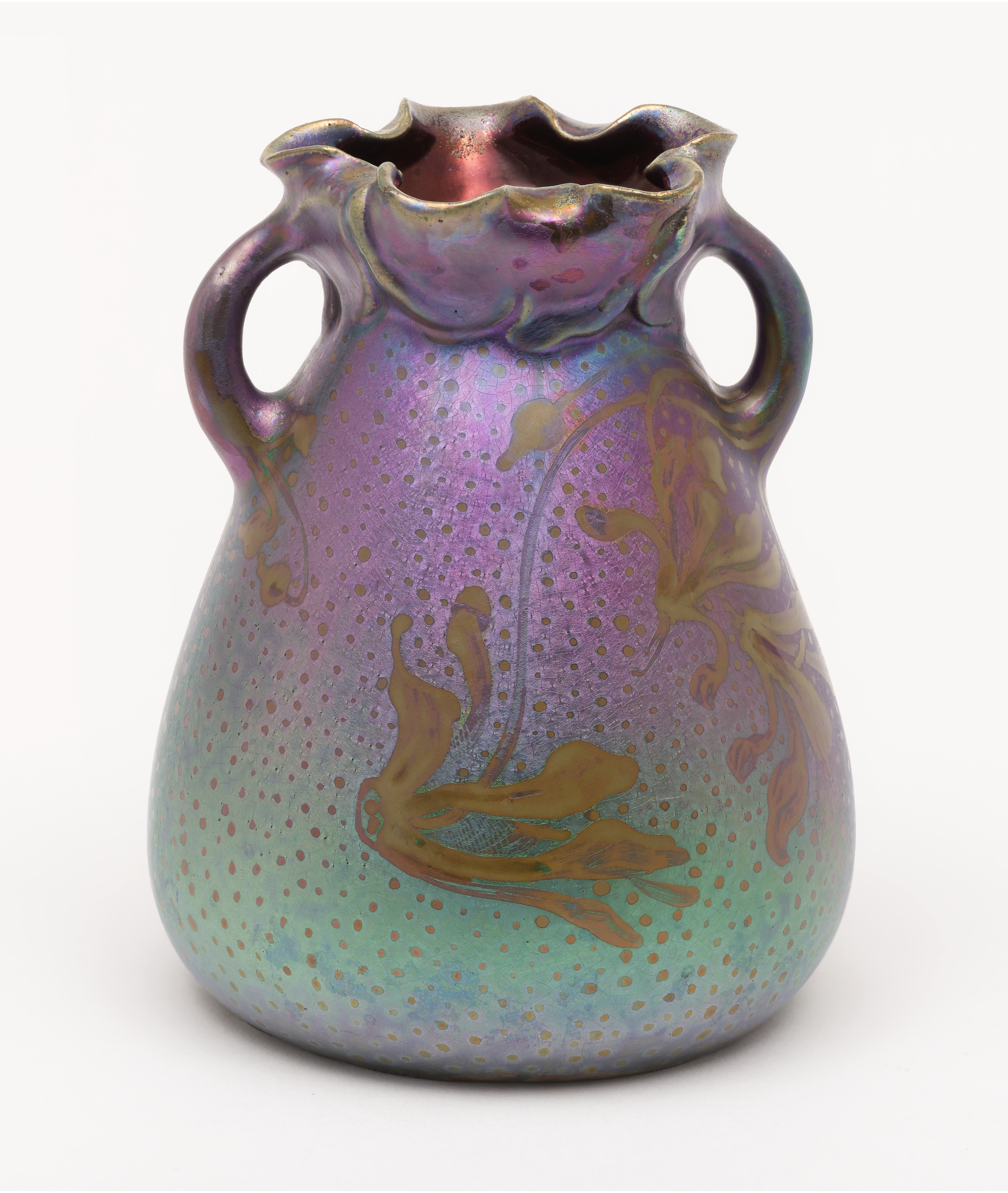
Vase, 1902–07, "Buff-gray clay body, cast. Slightly bulbous body, tapering to neck with crimped molded leaf rim ... Design on front and back of honeysuckle blossoms and vines against a random dot pattern painted in gold. Iridescent background shades... Interior covered with lustrous copper-red glaze. Bottom glazed a greenish-yellow high glaze; unglazed foot rim. Cracklature."

Louwelsa 1896–1924

Dickensware I 1897–1898

Dickensware II 1900–1905

Dickensware III 1903–1904

Turada 1897–1898

Aurelian 1898–1910

Eocean 1898–1918

Sicard 1902–1907

Jap Birdimal 1903

Fru Russet 1904

Floretta 1904

Hunter 1904

Matt Floretta 1904

Perfecto 1904

Dresden 1905–1910

Etna 1906

Burntwood and Claywood 1910

== Middle period, 1910−1932 ==
From 1916−1929, Rudolph Lorber developed Brighton birds, Muskota, Woodcraft, Forest, Glendale and other great naturalistic lines, ending with Coppertone in 1929. In 1917, Weller had introduced the family of Hudson lines. In this same period, Dorothy England Laughead created Silvertone, Chase, and the Garden Animals. John Lessell headed the decorating department from 1920−1924, developing luster−glaze lines including LaSa, Marengo, Cloudburst, Lamar, and others.

On July 1, 1922, Weller Pottery incorporated as "S.A. Weller, Inc."

Samuel Augustus Weller died on October 4, 1925. His nephew Harry Weller became president from 1925−1932, introducing continuous kiln operation. He consolidated the Weller plants in 1931 due to depression era economics, and died in auto crash in 1932. From 1930−1932, the last freehand decorated lines introduced at Weller were Stellar, Geode, Cretone, Raceme, and Bonito.

=== Middle period art ware and commercial lines ===
Cameo Jewel 1910

Souevo 1910

Camelot 1913

Clinton Ivory−before 1914

Roma 1914−late 1920s

Muskota 1915

Teakwood 1915

Athens 1915

Blue Drapery 1915

Brighton 1915

Copra 1915

Creamware 1915

Fairfield 1915

Orris 1915

Baldin 1915–1920

Flemish mid teens−1928

Forrest mid teens−1928

Jewell approx. 1916

Dupont late teens

Rosemont late teens−late 1920s

Zona 1920

== Late period, 1932−1948 ==
From 1932−1933, Sam Weller's son-in-law Frederic Grant was president for one year. When Grant divorced from Weller's daughter Ethel, Weller's other son-in-law, Irvin Smith, (married to Louise) became president from 1933−1937.

By 1935, freehand decoration had ended at Weller Pottery; from 1935−1948, Weller produced simplified embossed lines. From 1937−1948, Walter Hughes, a ceramic engineer and former employee at American Encaustic Tiling Company, was Weller Pottery's last president. During 1947−1948, Essex Wire Corporation acquired a controlling share in Weller, closing the pottery in 1948.

=== Late period commercial ware ===
Woodcraft 1920−1933

Hudson 1920's−mid 1930s

Voile early 1920s−1938

Alvin 1928

Glendale through the 1920s

Silvertone through the 1920s

== See also ==
Ceramic art
