= Wheaton Industries =

US company based in Millville, New Jersey

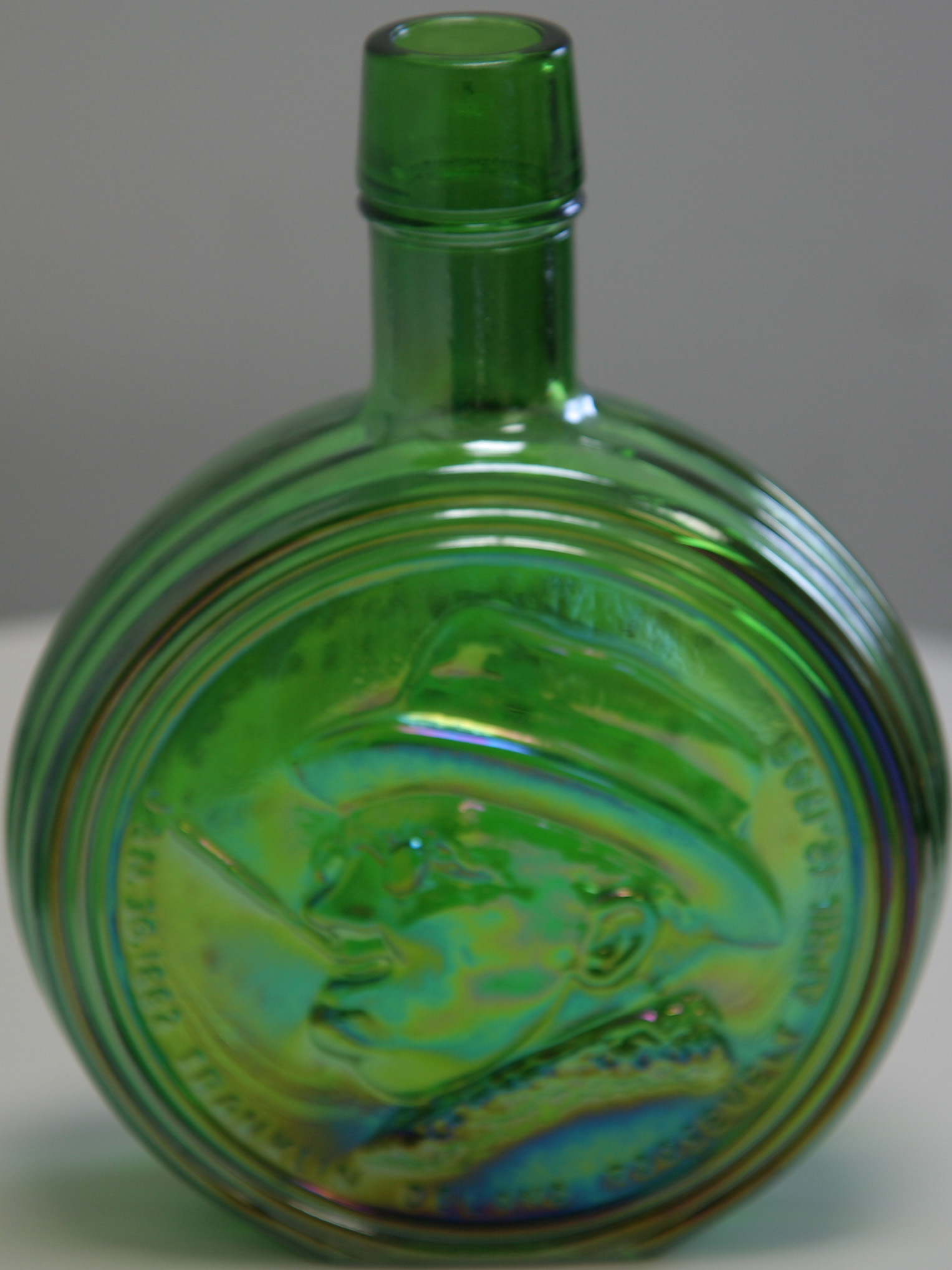
The Wheaton bottle acknowledges the importance of FDR in their presidential bottles collection with his iconic pipe in his mouth. The reverse side includes the quotation, "...we have nothing to fear but fear itself" as well as an inscription of his signature.

Wheaton Industries was a manufacturer of glassware and ceramics products in Millville, New Jersey, USA. A spin-off of the original firm (which returned to its pharmaceutical glass roots) adopted the name in 2006.

Founded in 1888 by Dr. Theodore Corson Wheaton, it became a major part of the economy of southern New Jersey, which had gained a reputation as the center of commercial glass manufacturing in the United States. The company was run by the Wheaton family, and at its height had 41 factories throughout the United States and subsidiaries in 20 other countries. Many of its vintage products are considered to be collector's items. Formerly a subsidiary of Alcan Packaging as Wheaton Science Products, it was made private in November 2006, and is once again known as Wheaton Industries.

== History ==
The company was founded by Theodore C. Wheaton, a pharmacist and businessman, who in 1883 settled in Millville, in Cumberland County, New Jersey, southeast of Philadelphia. Southern New Jersey had by that time emerged as the center of U.S. glass manufacturing because of the prevalence of natural resources such as wood and silica sand. Wheaton became particularly interested in the manufacture of pharmaceutical glassware, and in 1888 he established a small factory on the outskirts of Millville to manufacture his own bottles. The company became known as the T.C. Wheaton Co. Anticipating future growth of the company, Wheaton purchased 25 square blocks in Millville in an area bounded by Third Street, Wheaton Avenue and north to railroad siding which allowed the company to expand over the following decades. Wheaton's son, Frank H. Wheaton, Sr., entered the company in 1889. Two years later, the company suffered a financial setback when T.C. Wheaton entered into a bad business venture that left the company with debts that took ten years to pay off.

Frank Sr. assumed the presidency of the company in 1931 after the death of his father. He became known as the "dean of American glassware" during his tenure as company president. Despite the Great Depression, the company expanded greatly during the 1930s through the use of automation. The expansion continued through the 1940s and 1950s with acquisitions and new factory construction. The Millville facility became the basis of the local economy, employing family members over several generations throughout the 20th century.

Frank Wheaton Jr. took over the management of the company from his father in 1966. Frank Sr. remained board chairman until his death at age 102 in 1983. While he was company president, Frank Jr. founded Wheaton Village, a non-profit living museum and artisan colony in Millville which preserves the heritage of traditional glassmaking in southern New Jersey. He was ousted by the board of directors in 1991 after a long-running dispute with the Internal Revenue Service. George J. Straubmuller III, who was married to T.C. Wheaton's granddaughter Elizabeth Anderson Straubmuller, was elected by the board of directors to replace Frank Wheaton Jr. as Chairman & CEO of Wheaton Industries. George Straubmuller had been the President of the Wheaton Tubing Products division and was the leader behind the creation, development and the decades of success from this division within Wheaton Industries.

In 1996 the company was acquired by Algroup, a firm based in Switzerland, that was itself acquired by Alcan of Canada in 2000. Frank Jr. died in 1998. In 2002 the molded glass operation was spun off as The Glass Group Inc., which filed for bankruptcy in the summer of 2005. Its assets were purchased by India-based Gujarat Glass and Kimble Glass, a subsidiary of Gerresheimer, a German concern.

The company owned the assets of Stangl Pottery from 1972 to 1978.

== Today ==
Amcor Packaging of Australia now owns the glass tubing and plastic operations in Millville. Wheaton Science Products was spun off in late 2006 and was re-christened Wheaton Industries. In September 2015, a German company, DURAN Group GmbH, bought Wheaton Industries.

== Collectibles ==
The original Wheaton Industries' large variety of products spawned a community of collectors with sales on sites such as eBay. Many of the company's products are on display at the Museum of American Glass at WheatonArts, which remains a popular tourist destination.

== See also ==
- Schultz v. Wheaton Glass Co.
