= Wheaton Science Products =

- Company type: Subsidiary
- Headquarters: Millville, New Jersey, United States
- Parent: Alcan
- Website: wheatonsci.com

Wheaton Science Products is a subsidiary of Alcan based in Millville, New Jersey in the United States. The company manufactures glassware products for scientific and laboratory applications.

The company was previously Wheaton Industries and was one of the largest commercial glass and ceramics manufactures in the United States during the 20th century. In 1996 it was acquired by Algroup of Switzerland, which itself was acquired by Alcan of Canada in 2000. As Wheaton Industries, the company manufactured a wide variety of commercial products, many of which have become collector's items. The present subsidiary of Alcan Packaging has a more limited product line aimed at laboratory applications. It specializes in containers and vial products from both Type I borosilicate glass and Type III soda–lime glass, as well as plastic resins. The company also manufactures a BOD (Biochemical Oxygen Demand) bottle that is popular in the international market, as well as glass scintillation vials and a wide variety of glass and plastic rigid containers and closures.
