= WheatonArts =

American non-profit arts education organization

WheatonArts (officially Wheaton Arts and Cultural Center), formerly known as Wheaton Village, is an American non-profit arts education organization located in New Jersey. It is home to the Museum of American Glass

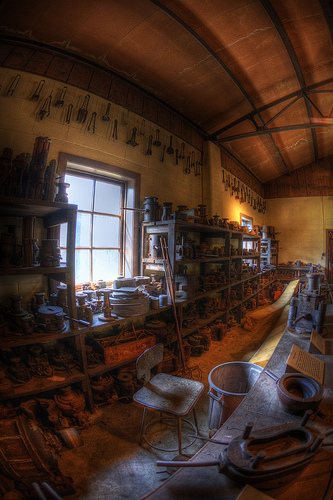

== History ==
Wheaton Village was founded in 1968. The organization was founded by Wheaton Glass, which was previously a major glass producer in Millville.

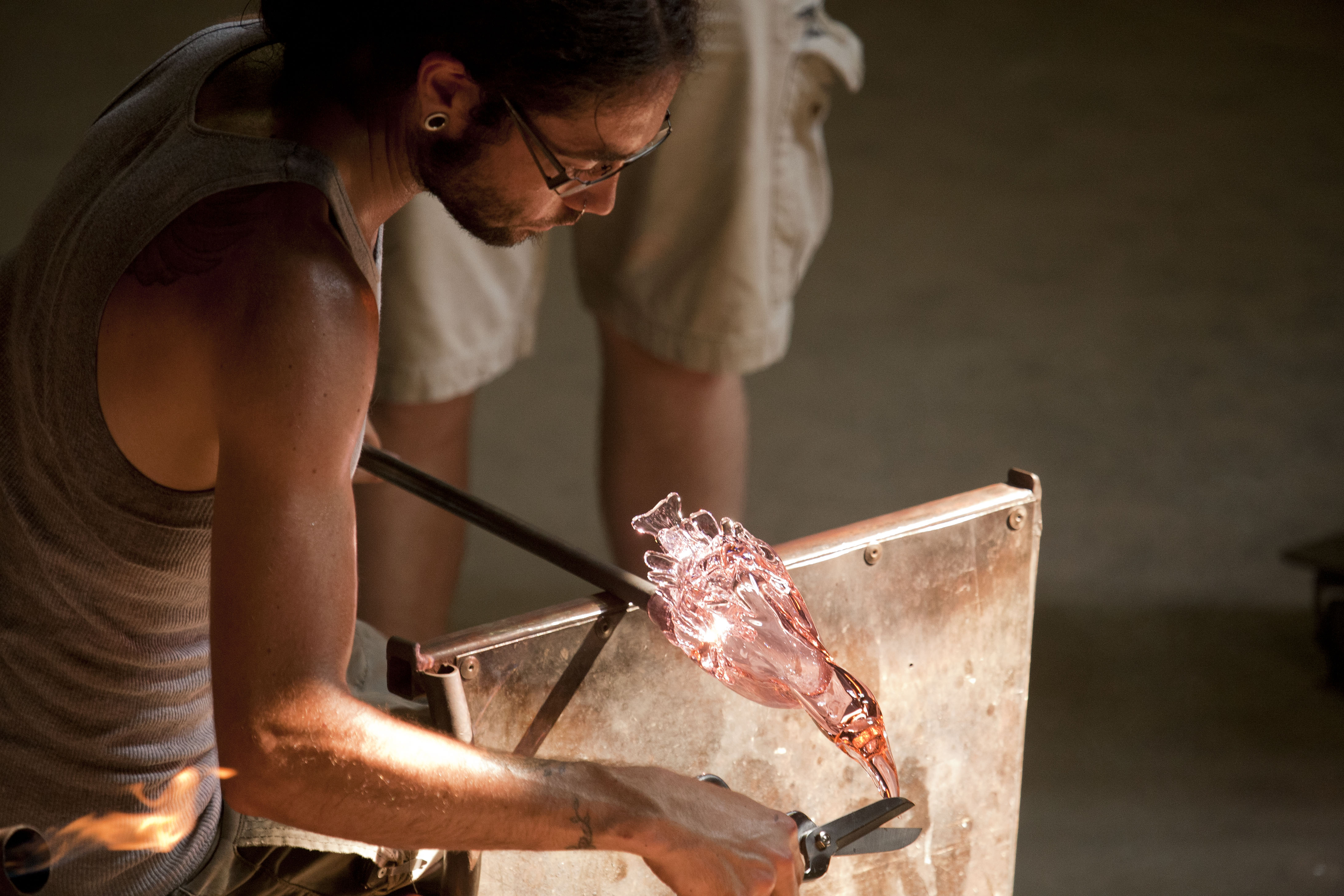

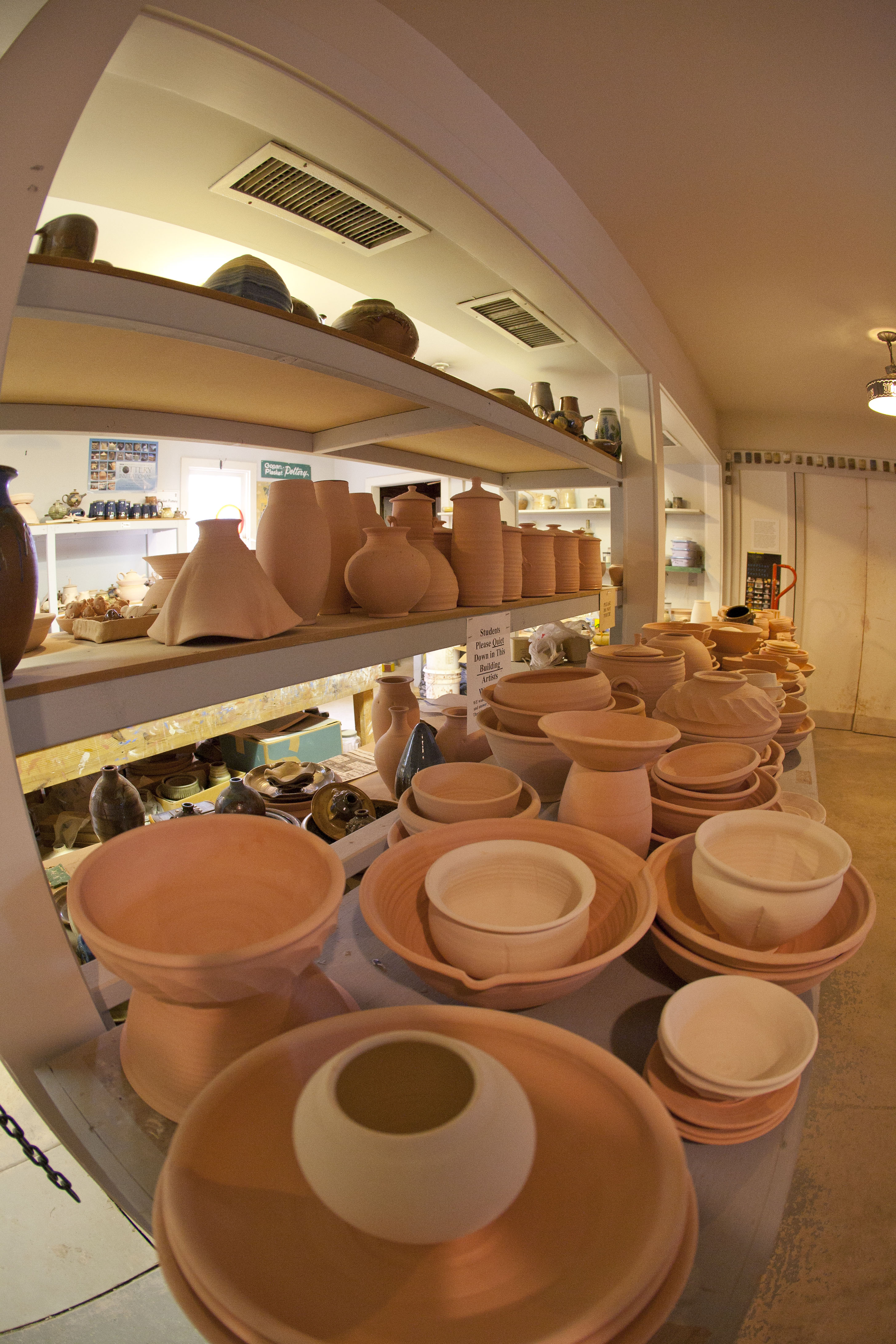

== Description ==
Wheaton Arts and Cultural Center, known as WheatonArts, is a 501(c)(3) non-profit arts education organization, with a focus on the medium of glass. Located in Millville, New Jersey, the center's mission is to engage artists and audiences in an evolving exploration of creativity.

Located on 65 acres (260,000 m^{2}) wooded in southern New Jersey, WheatonArts is home to the Museum of American Glass, the Creative Glass Fellowship Program that offers artist residencies, the largest folklife program in New Jersey, a hot glass studio, several traditional craft studios, five museum stores, a 13,000 sq ft (1,200 m^{2}) event center, and a picnic grove. In addition to daily glassblowing and craft demonstrations, WheatonArts features special exhibitions, programs, workshops, performances, and several weekend festivals throughout the year. WheatonArts hosts the Festival of Fine Craft yearly on the first full weekend in October.

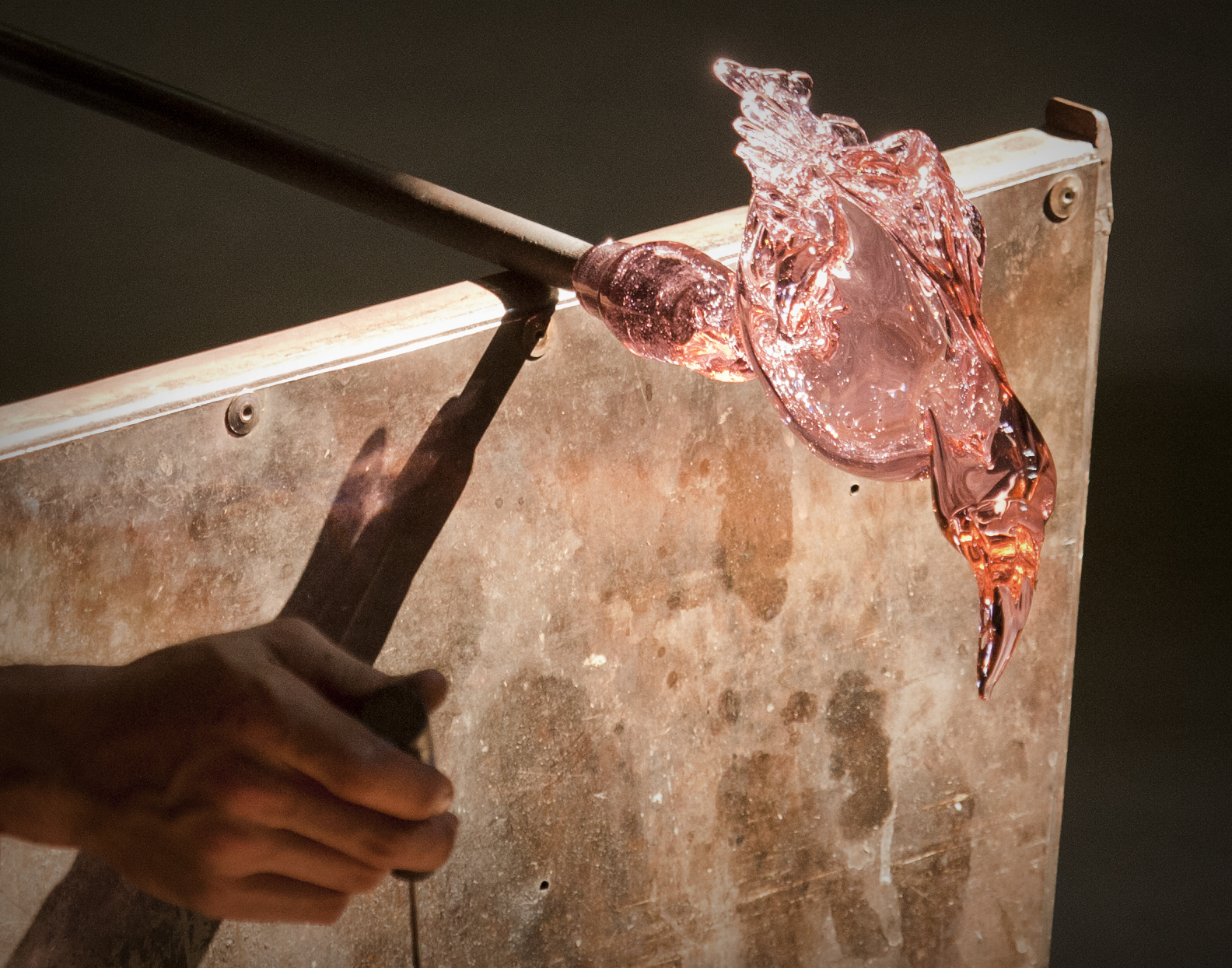

=== Museum of American Glass ===
The Museum of American Glass at WheatonArts houses over 7,000 pieces of glass, including a collection of glass produced by Wheaton Industries and other New Jersey glass-making companies. Exhibits include paperweights, pressed glass, cut glass, early glass, bottles, 19th-century art glass, Art Nouveau glass, modern and contemporary studio glass.

=== Artist studios ===
Artist residencies: WheatonArts offers 3-week and 6-week long Creative Glass Fellowships, available April through December.

The center houses several working studios for the creation of contemporary art in different media, including glass, ceramics, wood carving, and flameworking.

=== Down Jersey Folklife Center ===
The Down Jersey Folklife Center is a regional folklife center focusing on the cultural and artistic traditions of the communities and ethnic groups of southern New Jersey. The center offers exhibitions and concerts, dance performances, and classes. It is open during special events and for educational programs only.

== See also ==
- Wistarburgh Glass Works
