= Roseville Pottery =

American art pottery manufacturer

A Roseville jardiniere in the Pine Cone pattern

The Roseville Pottery Company was an American art pottery manufacturer in the 19th and 20th centuries. Along with Rookwood Pottery and Weller Pottery, it was one of the three major art potteries located in Ohio around the turn of the 20th century. Though the company originally made simple household pieces, the Arts and Crafts–inspired designs proved popular, and Roseville pieces are now sought after by collectors.

== History ==
A small vase from the Water Lily line

The company was founded by J.F. Weaver in Roseville, Ohio, in 1890. It was incorporated in 1892 by George Young, who became secretary and general manager. Under the direction of Young, the Roseville company had great success producing stoneware flower pots and other practical household items. In 1895, the company expanded by purchasing Midland Pottery, and by 1896 George Young had amassed a controlling interest in Roseville Pottery. In 1898, they purchased the Clark Stoneware Company in Zanesville, Ohio and moved the headquarters there.

In 1900 Young hired Ross C. Purdy to create the company's first art pottery line, named "Rozane" (a contraction of "Roseville" and "Zanesville"). The Rozane line was designed to compete against Rookwood Pottery's Standard Glaze, Owens Pottery's Utopian, and Weller Pottery's Louwelsa art lines. By 1901, the company owned and operated four plants and employed 325 people.

Backstamp on the underside of a vase

Frederick Hurten Rhead was the art director of Roseville between 1904 and 1909. He is associated with the Della Robbia line, and he designed or oversaw the Juvenile, Donatello, Mostique and Pauleo lines. Frederick's brother Harry Rhead stayed on at Weller after Frederick left.

Frank Ferrell became the art director for Roseville in 1917 and was responsible for creating many popular Roseville designs, which included Blackberry, Sunflower, and the company's most successful design, Pine Cone, which was produced in over 75 different shapes.

The Roseville Pottery Company produced its final designs in 1953, and the following year their facilities were bought by the Mosaic Tile Company.

In 2017, a company named The Kings Fortune in Fishers, Indiana, was granted trademarks by the U.S. Patent Office for both Roseville and Roseville Pottery. Marina Bosetti, a ceramic artist in Raleigh, North Carolina, was contracted to produce limited-edition tiles in the Art Nouveau style for the company.

== Collectors ==
Since the company closed in the 1950s, Roseville pottery has seen two distinct revivals: one with baby boomers in the 1970s, and again in the late 1990s and early 2000s during the Mission Style revival.

Today, many Roseville styles remain relatively common while rare pieces can fetch hundreds or even thousands of dollars. Because Roseville's designs were so influential, replicas and counterfeits are common, and the wide variety of labels, backstamps, and kiln markings—or the lack thereof— utilized by through the company's history on genuine pieces can be confusing for modern collectors.

A large urn in the Laurel style; note the heavy art deco influence

== Patterns and Lines ==
Apple Blossom	1948			
Artcraft	1933			
Artwood	1951			
Blackberry	1932			
Bleeding Heart	1938			
Clematis	1944			
Dahlrose	1924			
Della Robbia	1905			
Dogwood	1918			
Egypto	1905			
Falline	1933			
Freesia	1945			
Ferella	1930			
Ixia	1937			
Foxglove	1942			
Futura	1928			
Laurel	1934			
Peony	1942			
Mara	1905			
Magnolia	1943			
Mongol	1905			
Mostique	1910			
Olympic	1905			
Pauleo	1914			
Pinecone	1931			
Poppy	1930			
Rozane	1900			
Snowberry	1946			
Sunflower	1930	Tuscany 1928	Vista (Forest)	1920
Water Lily	1943			
Woodland	1905			
Zephyr Lily	1946			
Donatello	1916			
