= Kay Hackett =

American ceramic designer

Kay Hackett was an artist and ceramic designer most known for her work for Stangl Pottery.

== Personal life ==
Kay Hackett, born Kathleen Kay Kastner in 1919, grew up in Batavia, New York. Her talent as an artist was noticed early on by two townspeople in Batavia who provided Kay with the necessary funds for art lessons when she was a teen. She later enrolled at New York State College of Ceramics at Alfred University to study ceramic design.

Kay married John McLaughlin in 1944 and had two sons, Pat and Dave. She and John divorced in 1947. Hackett died in 2016 at the age of 96 in North Hanover, New Jersey.

== Stangl ==
Kay had early success selling her ceramic designs to potteries. Betty Stangl, a fellow undergraduate at Alfred University and daughter of Stangl Pottery Vice President Martin Stangl, suggested to her father that he should hire Kay. Stangl was particularly interested in Kay's thesis on the glazing of red clay - which would become a key element in the company's future success. When Kay graduated at twenty-one, she initially turned down Stangl's $20/week proposal, holding out until she was offered $25/week.

Her first dinnerware production for Stangl Pottery, called Verna, went into production less than a year after she started at the company. Kay went on to create designs Tulip and Fruit later that same year. The latter being one of the most popular designs in Stangl Pottery history.

During World War II, Kay left Stangl Pottery to work for General Motor's Eastern Aircraft division in Trenton. There she created line drawings for repair manuals for the Grumman Avenger airplane. She returned to Stangl in 1948, and continued until 1965, when she and her husband started a joint antique business.

Kay is credited with designing forty Stangl dinnerware patterns that were put into production.

She additionally designed over 100 artware and novelty products for the company. Her designs were often nature based and all were hand-painted.

== Legacy ==
In 2017, the Trenton City Museum mounted a retrospective of Kay's work. The exhibition paid special attention to one of her most famous designs, Thistle, which was manufactured by Stangl from 1951 to 1967.

A cup and saucer designed by Kay titled Lyric is housed in the Museum of Fine Art, Boston's collection.

== See also ==
- Stangl Pottery
