= Stangl Pottery =

Pottery manufacturer in New Jersey

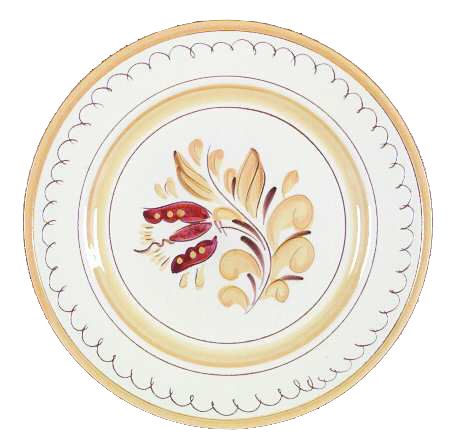
Stangl dinner plate, in the pattern "Provincial"

Stangl Pottery was a company in Flemington (and later Trenton), New Jersey, that manufactured a line of dinnerware, figurines, and other items between the 1930s and 1978 under the Stangl brand. The company was founded as Samuel Hill Pottery in 1814. It became the Fulper Pottery Company in 1860 and produced a notable line of art pottery under the Vasekraft brand between 1909 and 1934. After 1935, the company produced only the Stangl Pottery line.

The company name changed to Stangl Pottery in 1955. The company ceased production and closed in 1978, but the dinnerware is still prized by collectors. Pieces can be identified by the Stangl name on the bottom. The original Flemington, New Jersey, location and showroom was bought in May 2011 to make space for a restaurant, a studio, and an art gallery.

== Hill Pottery ==
The company was founded in 1814 as Samuel Hill Pottery, named after the founder. It was located in Flemington, New Jersey. During the early stage of its business, the company specialized in creating storage crocks and red clay pipes.

== Fulper Pottery ==
Abraham Fulper later became Hill's partner and Fulper bought the company in 1860, naming it Fulper Pottery. Fulper Pottery also still created storage crocks and red clay pipes, but Fulper's sons later helped the business at the end of the 19th century, and they produced fire-proof cookware alongside the Germ-Proof Filter. The Germ-Proof Filter was a precursor to the modern water cooler and it provided people with potable water in public places that normally had non-sanitary water. In the beginning of the 20th century, John Kusman, the company's most distinguished potter, started creating jugs and vases. William H. Fulper II, Abraham's grandson, brought some of the jugs and vases to the 1904 Louisiana Purchase Exposition, along with the Germ-Proof Filter. The jugs and vases received an honorable mention at the exposition. In 1928, the company moved to Trenton, New Jersey.

At the time, pottery from China was receiving attention throughout the United States so Fulper wanted the company to produce similar wares. Dr. Cullen Parmalee, the head of the ceramic department at Rutgers University, created glazes based on ancient Chinese pottery and they were part of the Fulper Vasekraft brand. Parmalee's pottery had unreliable coloration and was expensive to make. By 1910, the majority of Parmalee's glazes were gone. Johann Martin Stangl took over the Vasekraft products and he moved away from copying Chinese pottery. Instead, Stangl created a multitude of designs which included candleholders, bookends, perfume lamps, and tobacco jars.

== Stangl Pottery ==
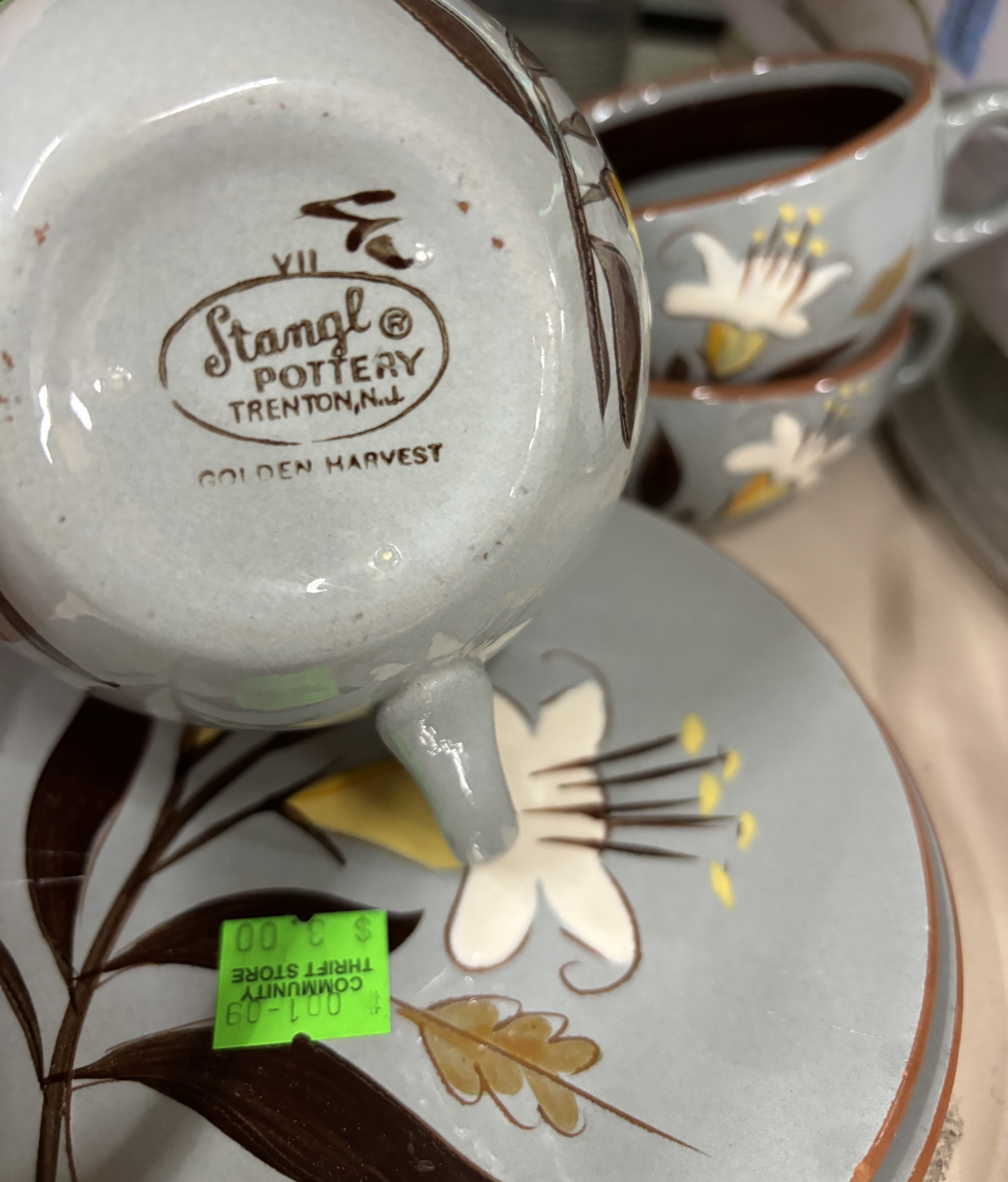
Hand-painted "Golden Harvest" dinnerware with stamp and worker's initials

Upon Fulper's death in 1928, Stangl became president of the company and only the Stangl Pottery line was produced after 1935. From 1929 and onward, the pottery had the marking Stangl or Stangl USA. In addition to dinnerware, Stangl was known for its line of bird figurines which were sold from the 1940s to the 1970s. The bird figurines were called the Birds of America series and their designs were based on illustrations by John James Audubon. The designs of Stangl dinnerware were created by Kay Hackett, and featured folk art designs based on Pennsylvania Dutch motifs and nature such as fruit, garden flowers, and thistles. Stangl contributed to the World War II effort by teaching basic techniques to local women so that the company could produce red clay dinnerware. Both the carvers and painters put their initials on the back of the dinnerware.

The company's name was changed to Stangl Pottery in 1955, but the company's dinnerware had the Stangl mark from 1930. When Stangl died in 1972, the company's assets were sold to Frank Wheaton, Jr., the owner of Wheaton Industries. The pottery was produced until 1978 when Pfaltzgraff bought the rights and the rest of the assets were liquidated. Stangl's products are still collectible, and sought-after items include the bird figurines, milk jugs, and creamers. The original Flemington, New Jersey, location and showroom were bought in May 2011 to make space for a restaurant, a studio, and an art gallery.

=== Trenton factory ===
In the early 1970s, the Historic American Engineering Record program documented the Trenton factory: "The Anchor (Stangl) Pottery Company is a surviving example of a clay processing plant, involved in the making of flatware before the age of automation. At the time of documentation the jiggerman still made the pieces by using a forming tool to spread the clay evenly in the plaster molds. Belt run clay mixers and pug mills, as well as filter presses can still be found at Stangl."

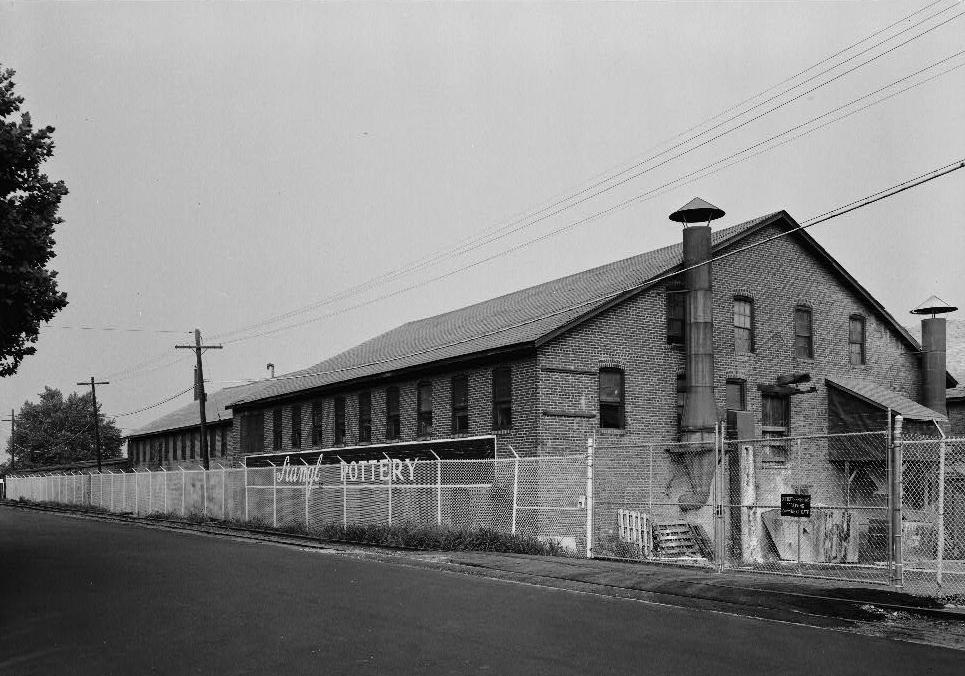
General view of factory

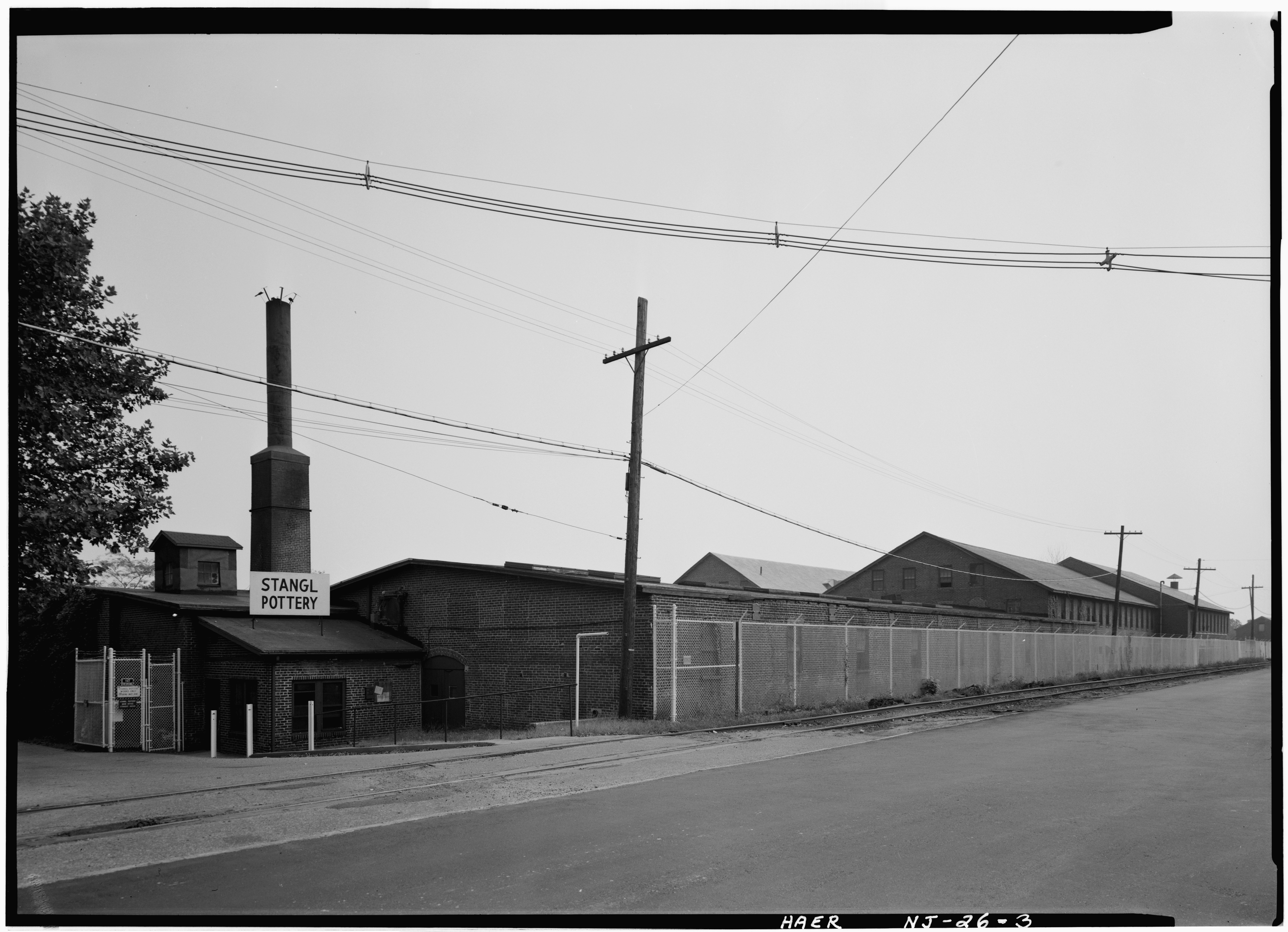
North side of factory

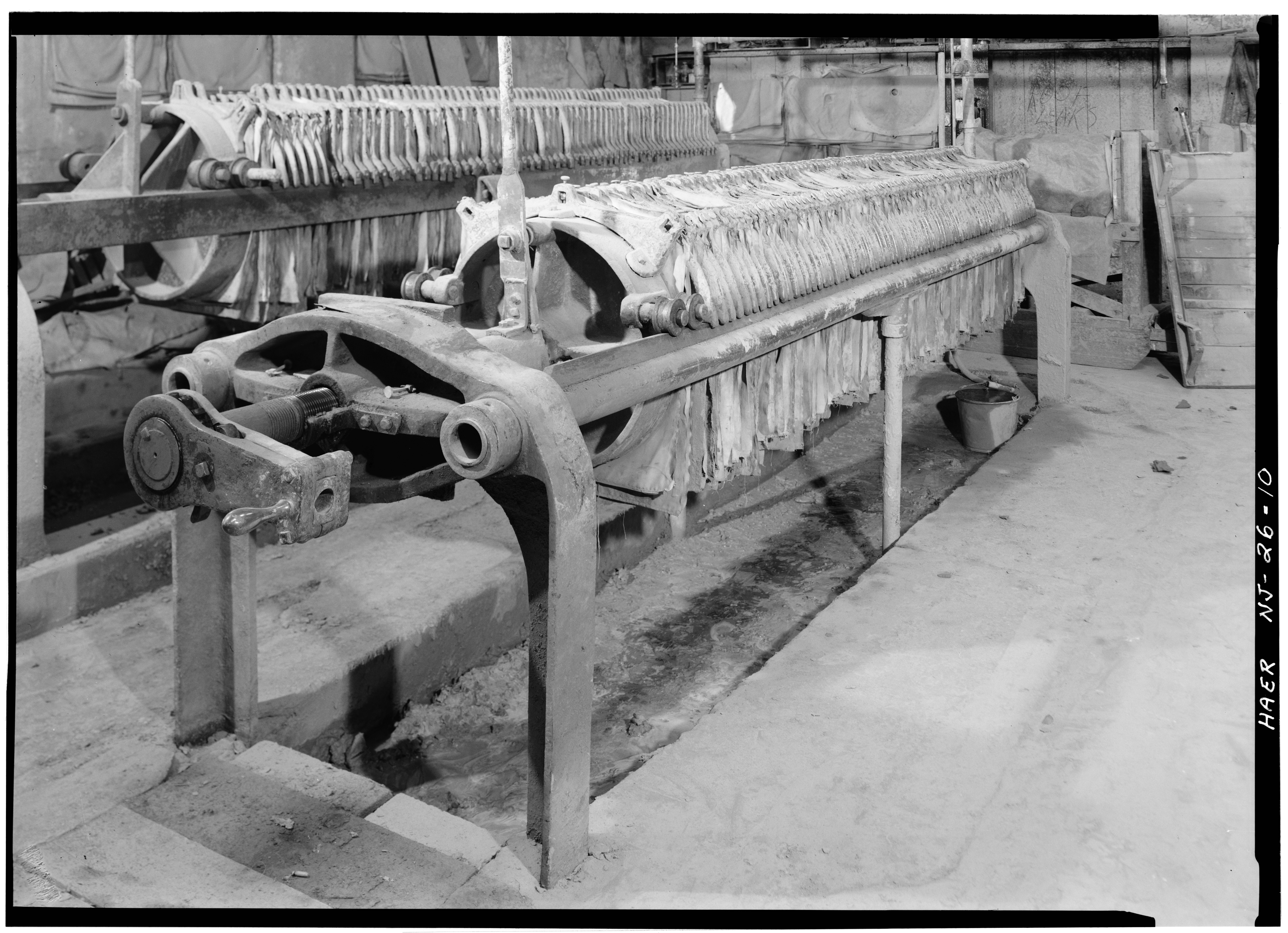
Clay press

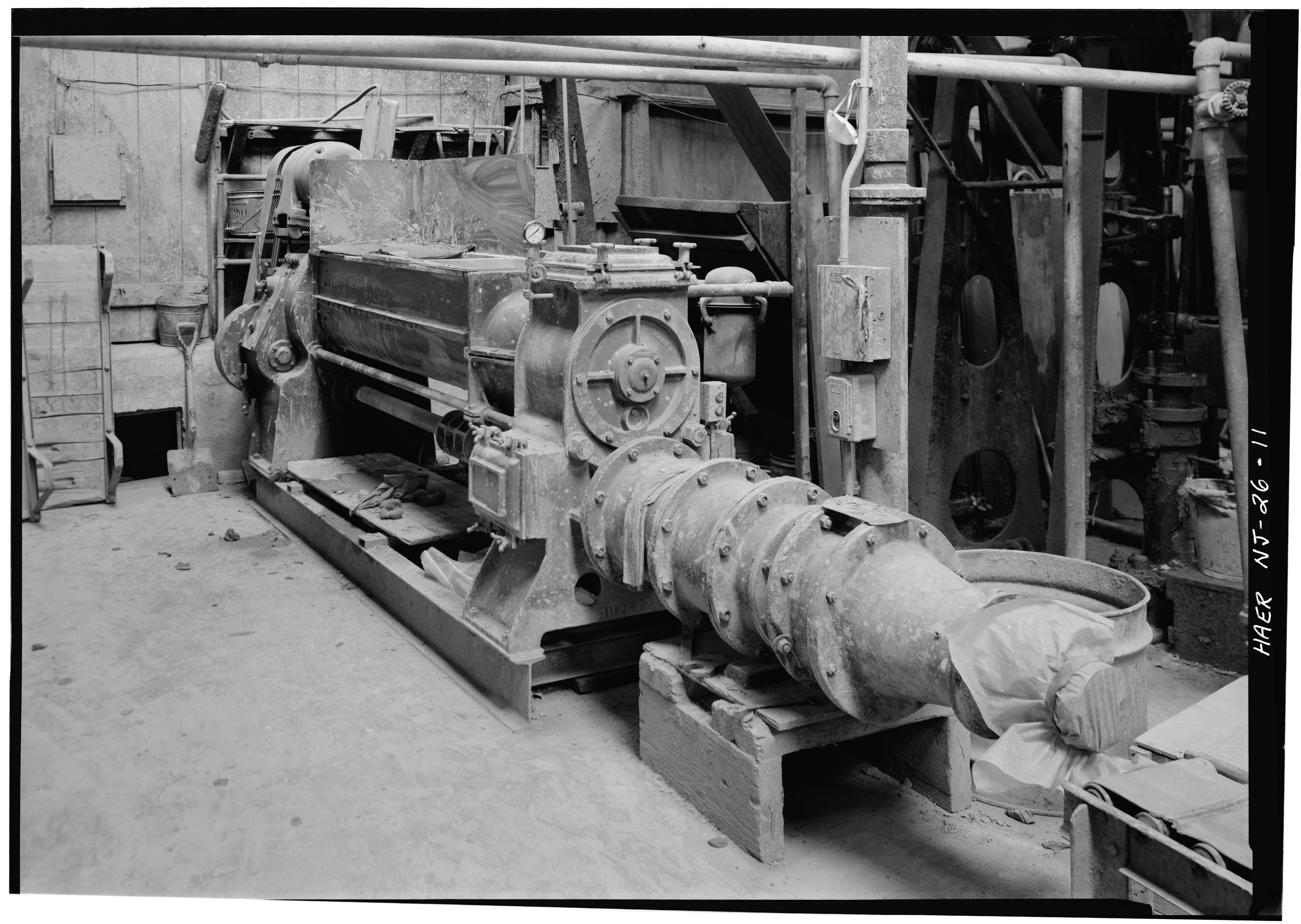
Clay extruder

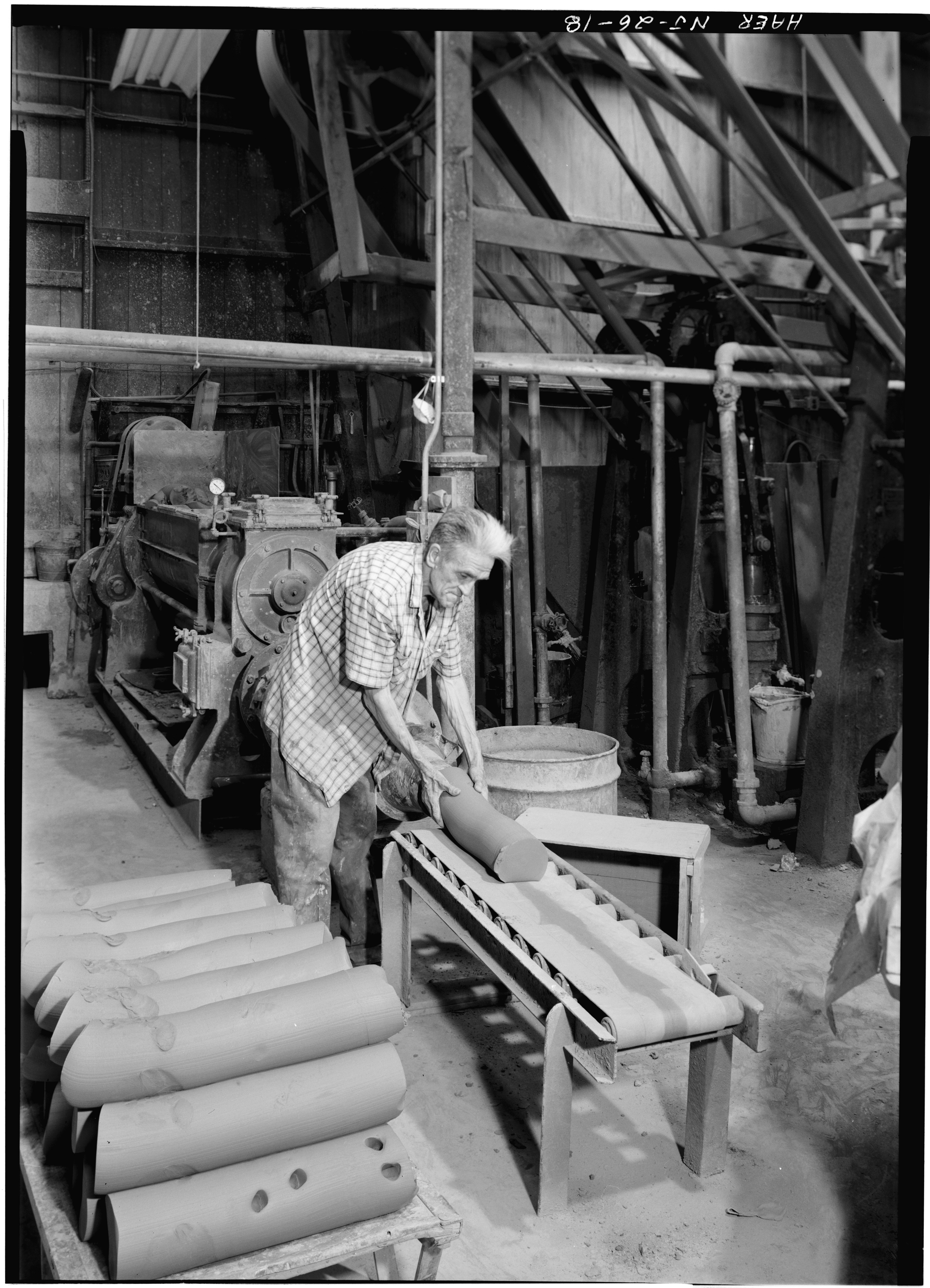
Workman at clay extruder removing formed clay

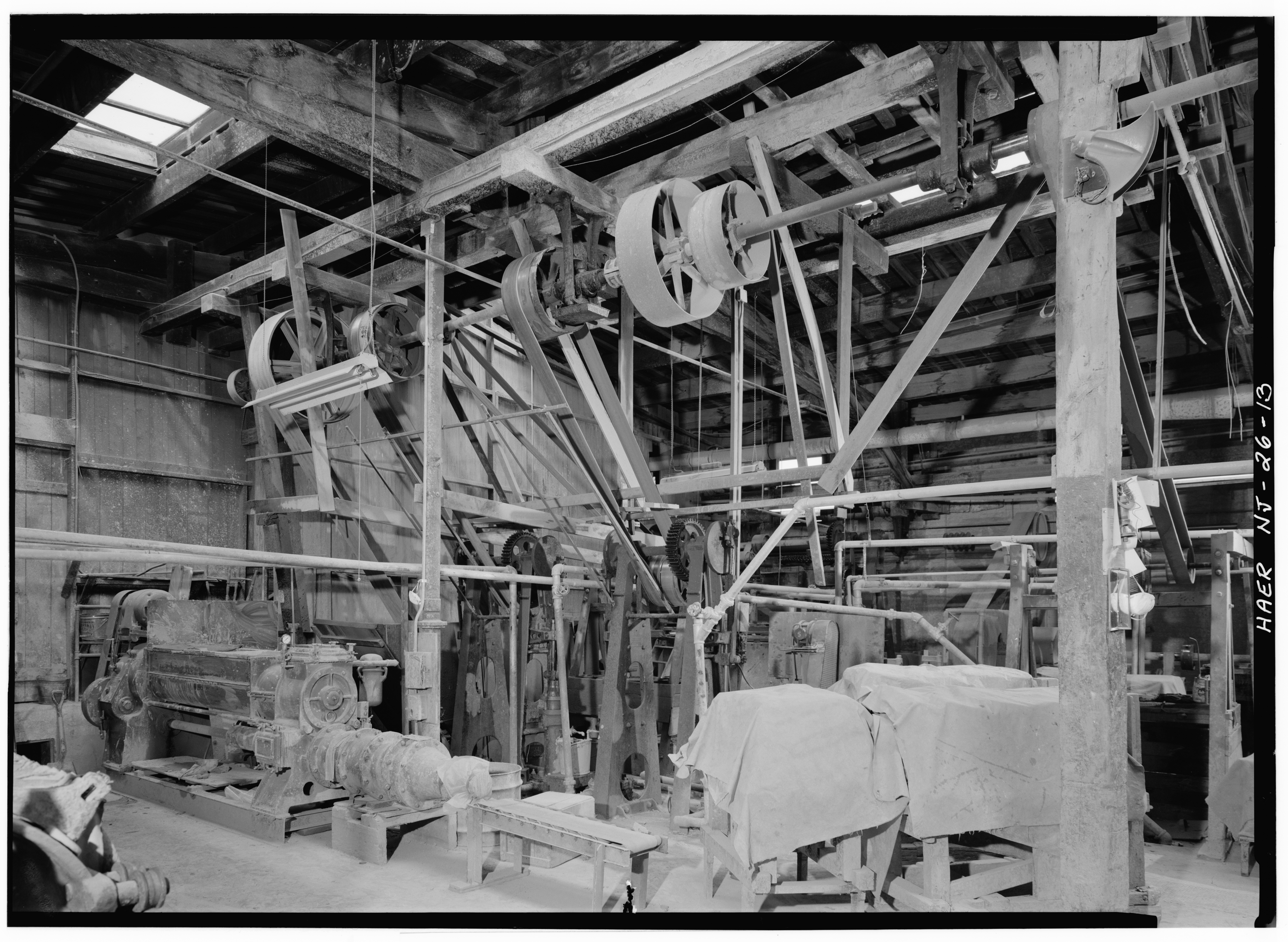
Overhead power transmission equipment
