= Laura Anne Fry =

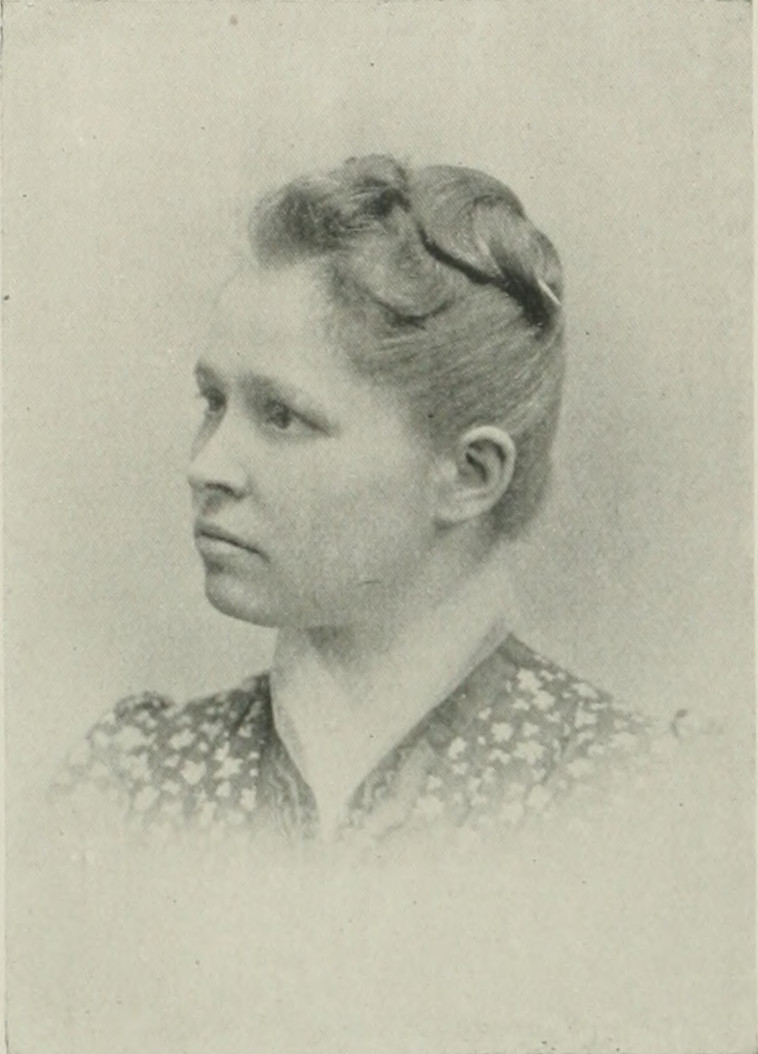
- Laura Ann Fry "Woman of the Century"
- Born: January 22, 1857
- Died: 1943 (aged 85–86)

Laura Anne Fry (January 22, 1857 – July 30, 1943) was an American artist who specialized in wood carving, ceramics, and china painting. She worked at both the Rookwood Pottery Company and the Lonhuda Pottery Company as a ceramic painter and teacher, and she received a patent for one of her technical innovations. She headed up the Purdue University Art Department for a quarter of a century, and under her guidance, the department developed a high reputation for its ceramic program.

== Early life and education ==
Laura Anne Fry was born in White County, Indiana, not far from Lafayette. Both her father, Wiliam Henry Fry, and her grandfather Henry Lindley Fry were artists as well and taught her wood carving. Her family moved to Cincinnati, Ohio, so that her father could take up a position teaching at the McMicken School of Design. At the age of 12, she began training at the school herself, and she returned intermittently until the mid-1880s. She initially studied drawing and modeling with Louis Rebisso and later china painting with Maria Eggers and life drawing with Thomas Satterwhite Noble. Fry is thought to have gained most of her ceramics training in New Jersey and in Europe, though the details are lost. She also spent time at the Art Students League in New York in 1886.

== Art career ==
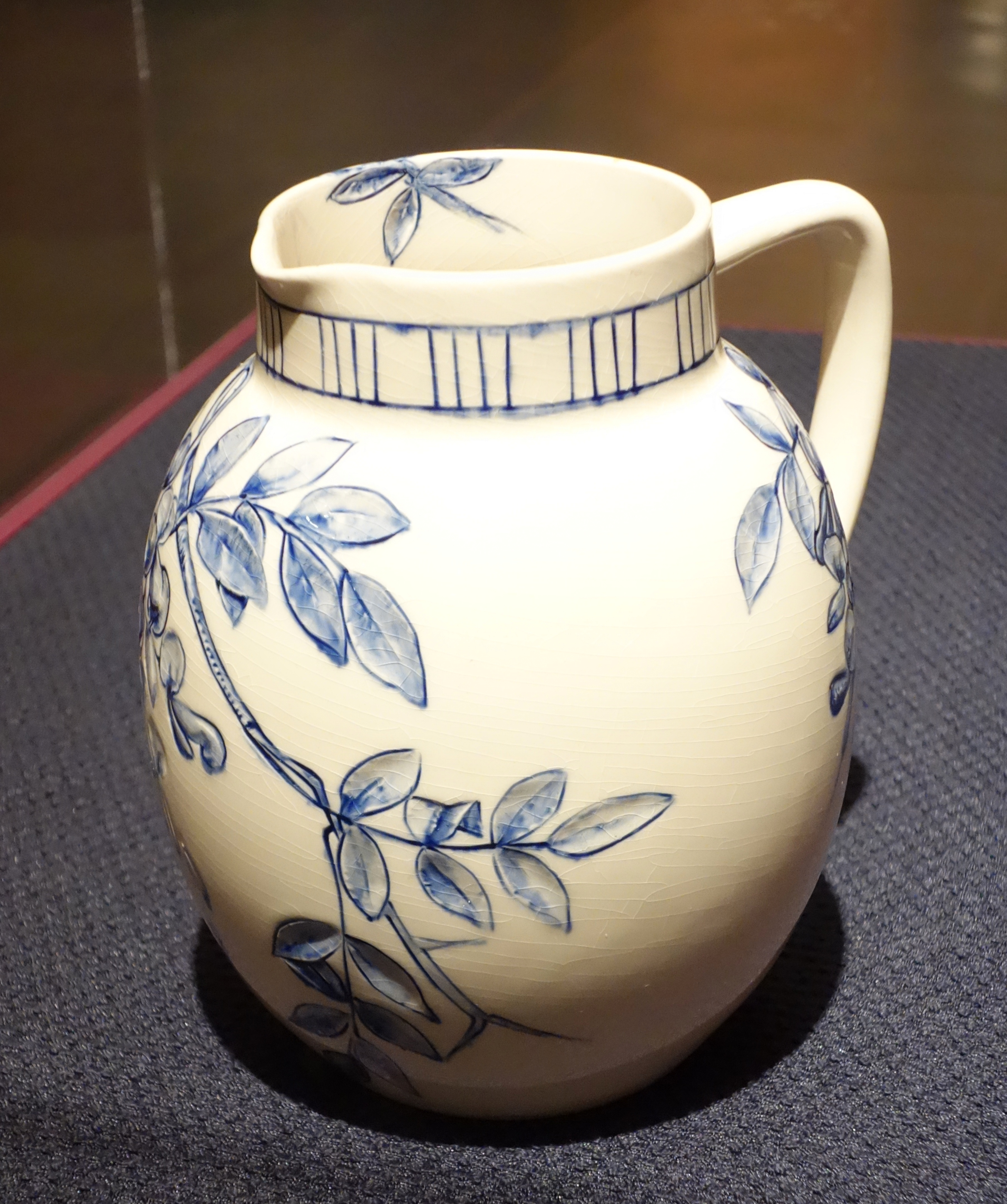
Glazed earthenware vase by Laura Anne Fry for the Rookwood Pottery Company, 1883.

Fry was an exceptionally talented woodcarver, and one of her earliest public works was a carved panel of lilies that took first prize ($100 in gold) in a competition for designs to decorate the organ screen in Cincinnati Music Hall, which has been called the "magnum opus of the wood-carving movement" in late 19th century America. For several years, she ran the wood-carving school of the local Chautauqua Assembly. In 1893, Fry received an award for her wood carving at the World's Columbian Exposition in Chicago.

She briefly opened her own studio, where she worked in carving, furniture design, and china painting. Unable to make a financial success of it, she closed it and in 1881 took a job at the Rookwood Pottery Company, which had been founded by Maria Longworth Nichols Storer the year before. Fry worked there for seven years, developing forms, decorating pottery, and teaching modeling and ceramic design to students. She was one of the original members of the Cincinnati Pottery Club (founded 1879), a group of women that organized to pursue experiments in pottery and that was influential in the development of the American art pottery movement of the late 19th century.

In 1891, Fry was offered a position as professor of industrial art at Purdue University. She left in 1892 to work for Lonhuda Pottery Company in Steubenville, Ohio. Returning to teach at Purdue in 1893, she served as head of the Art Department until her retirement in 1922. Under Fry's leadership, the department developed a high reputation for its ceramics program.

== Innovations ==
While studying ceramics in Europe, Fry perfected a technique called "scratch-blue" that was originally developed by Hannah Barlow at the Doulton factory in London.

During her years at Rookwood, Fry innovated a new technique for applying underglaze pigments evenly to damp clay surfaces using a mouth-held atomizer. This allowed for subtle blending of colors and became the standard method used at Rookwood for backgrounds. She was awarded a patent on her invention in 1889, but when Rookwood continued using it after she left to work at Lonhuda, she sued to stop them. Judge William Howard Taft ruled against her on the grounds that her technique was merely a new use for an existing tool.

Fry died in 1943, and her papers are held by Purdue University.
