= Fultonham, Ohio =

- Village
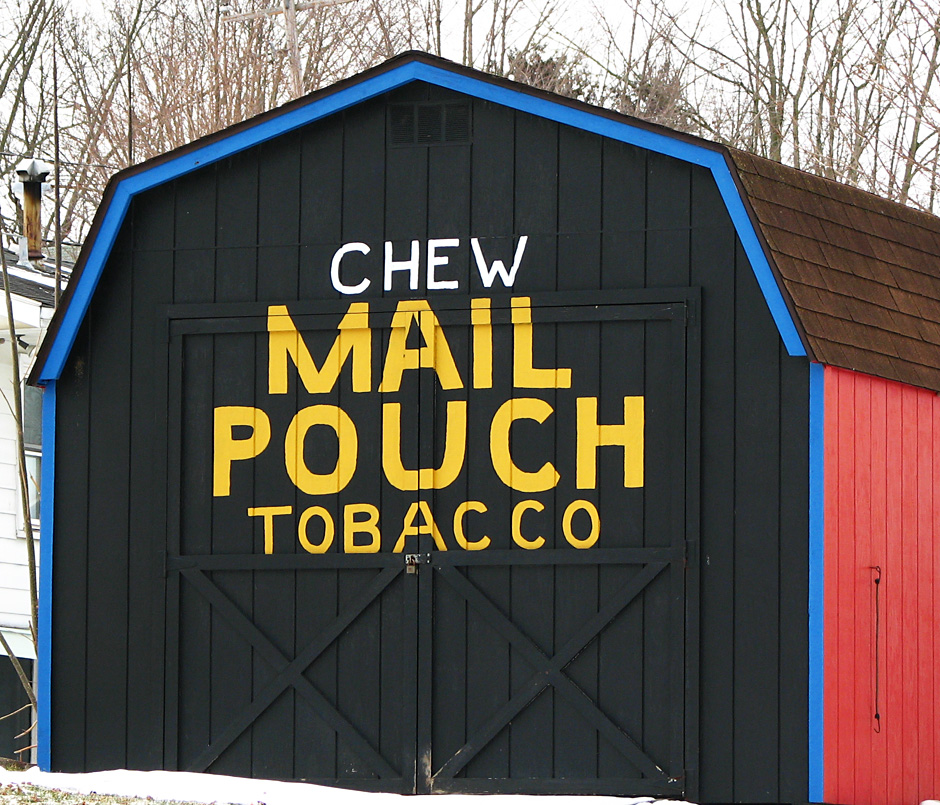
- Reproduction Mail Pouch tobacco barn
- Nickname: Old Town
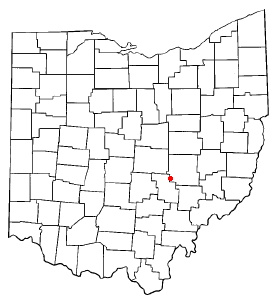
- Location of Fultonham, Ohio

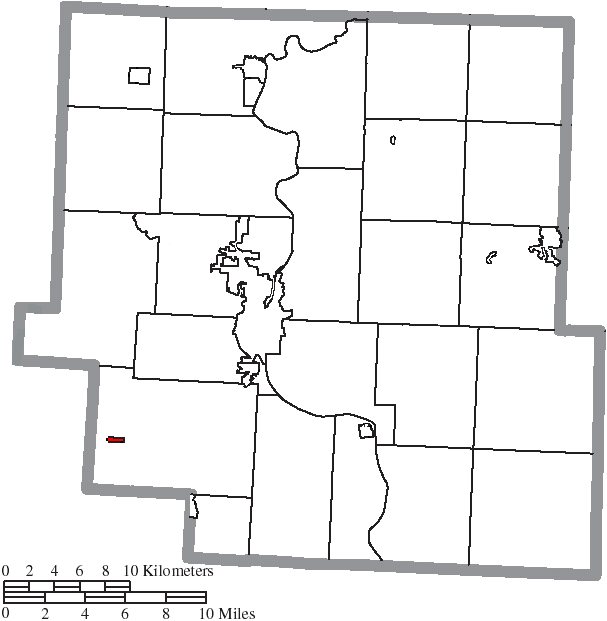
- Location of Fultonham in Muskingum County
- Coordinates: 39°51′21″N 82°08′27″W
- Country: United States
- State: Ohio
- County: Muskingum
- Township: Newton

Area
  - Total: 0.093 sq mi (0.24 km^{2})
  - Land: 0.093 sq mi (0.24 km^{2})
  - Water: 0 sq mi (0.00 km^{2})
- Elevation: 984 ft (300 m)

Population (2020)
  - Total: 115
  - Estimate (2023): 112
  - Density: 1,248.8/sq mi (482.16/km^{2})
- Time zone: UTC-5 (Eastern (EST))
  - Summer (DST): UTC-4 (EDT)
- ZIP code: 43738
- Area code: 740
- FIPS code: 39-29064
- GNIS feature ID: 2398931

Fultonham is a village in Muskingum County, Ohio, United States. The population was 115 at the 2020 census. It is part of the Zanesville micropolitan area. Fultonham was named for Robert Fulton, inventor of the first commercially successful steamboat.

== History ==
Fultonham was originally called Uniontown, and under the latter name was platted in 1815. A post office called Uniontown was established in 1818, and the name was changed to Fultonham in 1828.

== Geography ==
According to the United States Census Bureau, the village has a total area of 0.16 square miles (0.41 km^{2}), all land.

== Demographics ==
Historical population
Census	Pop.	Note	%±
1900	245		—
1910	210		−14.3%
1920	168		−20.0%
1930	165		−1.8%
1940	240		45.5%
1950	232		−3.3%
1960	213		−8.2%
1970	228		7.0%
1980	281		23.2%
1990	178		−36.7%
2000	151		−15.2%
2010	176		16.6%
2020	115		−34.7%
2023 (est.)	112	▼	−2.6%
U.S. Decennial Census

=== 2010 census ===
As of the census of 2010, there were 176 people, 61 households, and 46 families living in the village. The population density was 1,100.0 inhabitants per square mile (424.7/km^{2}). There were 69 housing units at an average density of 431.3 per square mile (166.5/km^{2}). The racial makeup of the village was 100.0% White.

There were 61 households, of which 41.0% had children under the age of 18 living with them, 42.6% were married couples living together, 26.2% had a female householder with no husband present, 6.6% had a male householder with no wife present, and 24.6% were non-families. 19.7% of all households were made up of individuals, and 6.6% had someone living alone who was 65 years of age or older. The average household size was 2.89 and the average family size was 3.28.

The median age in the village was 33.7 years. 27.8% of residents were under the age of 18; 8.6% were between the ages of 18 and 24; 27.9% were from 25 to 44; 24.5% were from 45 to 64; and 11.4% were 65 years of age or older. The gender makeup of the village was 49.4% male and 50.6% female.

=== 2000 census ===
As of the census of 2000, there were 151 people, 57 households, and 36 families living in the village. The population density was 964.9 inhabitants per square mile (372.5/km^{2}). There were 61 housing units at an average density of 389.8 per square mile (150.5/km^{2}). The racial makeup of the village was 98.01% White, 1.32% African American, and 0.66% from two or more races.

There were 57 households, out of which 33.3% had children under the age of 18 living with them, 45.6% were married couples living together, 17.5% had a female householder with no husband present, and 35.1% were non-families. 24.6% of all households were made up of individuals, and 8.8% had someone living alone who was 65 years of age or older. The average household size was 2.65 and the average family size was 3.32.

In the village, the population was spread out, with 25.2% under the age of 18, 11.9% from 18 to 24, 23.8% from 25 to 44, 29.8% from 45 to 64, and 9.3% who were 65 years of age or older. The median age was 39 years. For every 100 females there were 104.1 males. For every 100 females age 18 and over, there were 91.5 males.

The median income for a household in the village was $28,194, and the median income for a family was $32,083. Males had a median income of $26,563 versus $24,583 for females. The per capita income for the village was $13,265. There were 7.5% of families and 13.3% of the population living below the poverty line, including no under eighteens and none of those over 64.

== Notable people ==
- Thomas A. Hendricks, 21st vice president of the United States
