= Lonhuda pottery =

Lonhuda pottery produced by the Lonhuda Pottery Company of Steubenville, Ohio, United States, was a pottery business founded in 1892 by William Long (1844–1918) with investors W.H. Hunter and Alfred Day. The pottery business utilized underglaze faience. It is known for brown underglaze and slip-decoration. The firm closed in 1896. Marks vary and include the letters LPCO and the Lonhuda name above a feathered head.

The ceramicist Laura Anne Fry worked for Lonhuda in 1892–93.

== See also ==
- Weller pottery
