= Valentien =

Valentien is a surname. Notable people with the surname include:

- Albert Robert Valentien (1862–1925), American painter
- Anna Marie Valentien (1862–1947), American sculptor
