= Louise Abel =

Louise Abel may refer to:

- Louise Abel (photographer) (1841–1907), German-born Norwegian photographer
- Louise Abel (sculptor) (1894–1981), German-American sculptor and ceramist
