= Harriet "Hattie" Elizabeth Wilcox =

American artist (1869–1943)

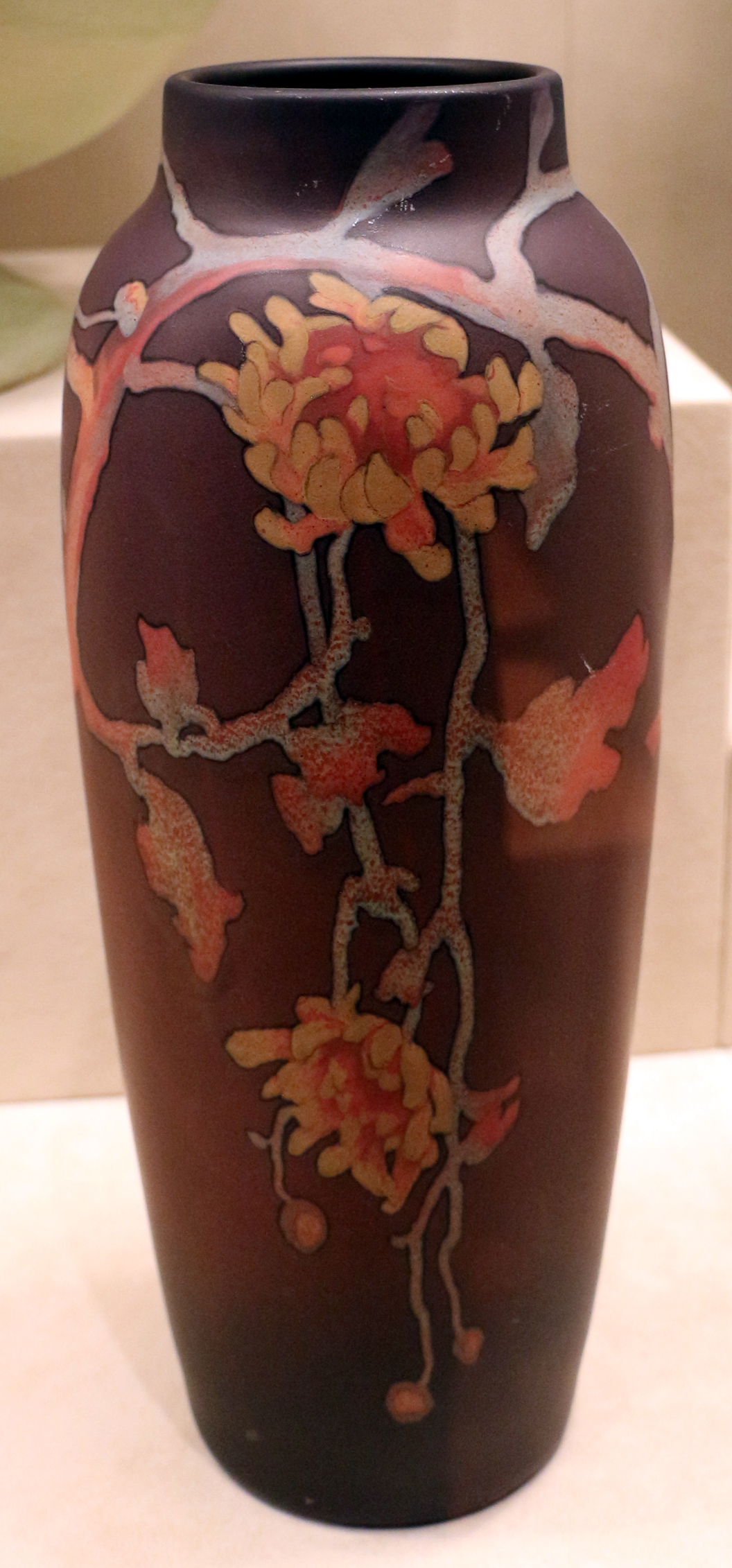
Vase decorated by Harriet Wilcox, 1906. Collection of the Cincinnati Art Museum

Harriet Elizabeth Wilcox (September 7, 1869 – May 17, 1943) was an American artist. She was most known as a decorator of Rookwood Pottery.

== Biography ==
=== Early life and education ===
Ms. Wilcox was born on September 7, 1869, and was educated at the Cincinnati Art Academy. The Circular and Fifth Annual Catalogue of the Art Academy of Cincinnati 1889-1890 lists her as a fourth grade student in Drawing with instructor L. C. Lutz and Water Color Painting with instructor W. H. Humphreys. Her obituary also states that she was a "former pupil of Frank Duveneck".

=== Career ===
The book Rookwood Pottery Potpourri by Virginia Raymond Cummins (C. R. Leonard and D. Coleman, Silver Spring, Maryland, 1980) states that Ms. Wilcox "began her decorating career at Rookwood Pottery in 1886, and, except for a few years after 1907, was there until the 1930s" (p. 51). The book notes that her work is exhibited in the Victoria and Albert Museum, the Royal Industrial Art Museum (Berlin), and the Industrial Art Museum (Prague).

According to the Williams' City Directories, Ms. Wilcox is listed as an artist every year, and is listed as working at Rookwood Pottery in particular from 1921 to 1938. Beginning in 1939, Ms. Wilcox is no longer listed as working for Rookwood, but is again listed simply as "artist." One can find pictures of Ms. Wilcox in Herbert Peck's The Book of Rookwood Pottery (Crown Publishers, New York, 1968), which also reproduces the signature used on her decorated works.

Harriet Wilcox never married, residing with her sisters, Grace and Louise, and their mother, Zilpha.

=== Death and afterward ===
Ms. Willcox died on May 17, 1943. At the time of her death, she was residing at 2113 Fulton Ave. in the Walnut Hills area of Cincinnati. As to the circumstances, her death certificate lists the cause of death as "malnutrition--failure to eat because of mental disorder." A contributing factor to her death was listed as "insanity due to auto accident 15 years ago." She is buried at Spring Grove Cemetery.
