= Sara Sax =

American artist (1870–1949)

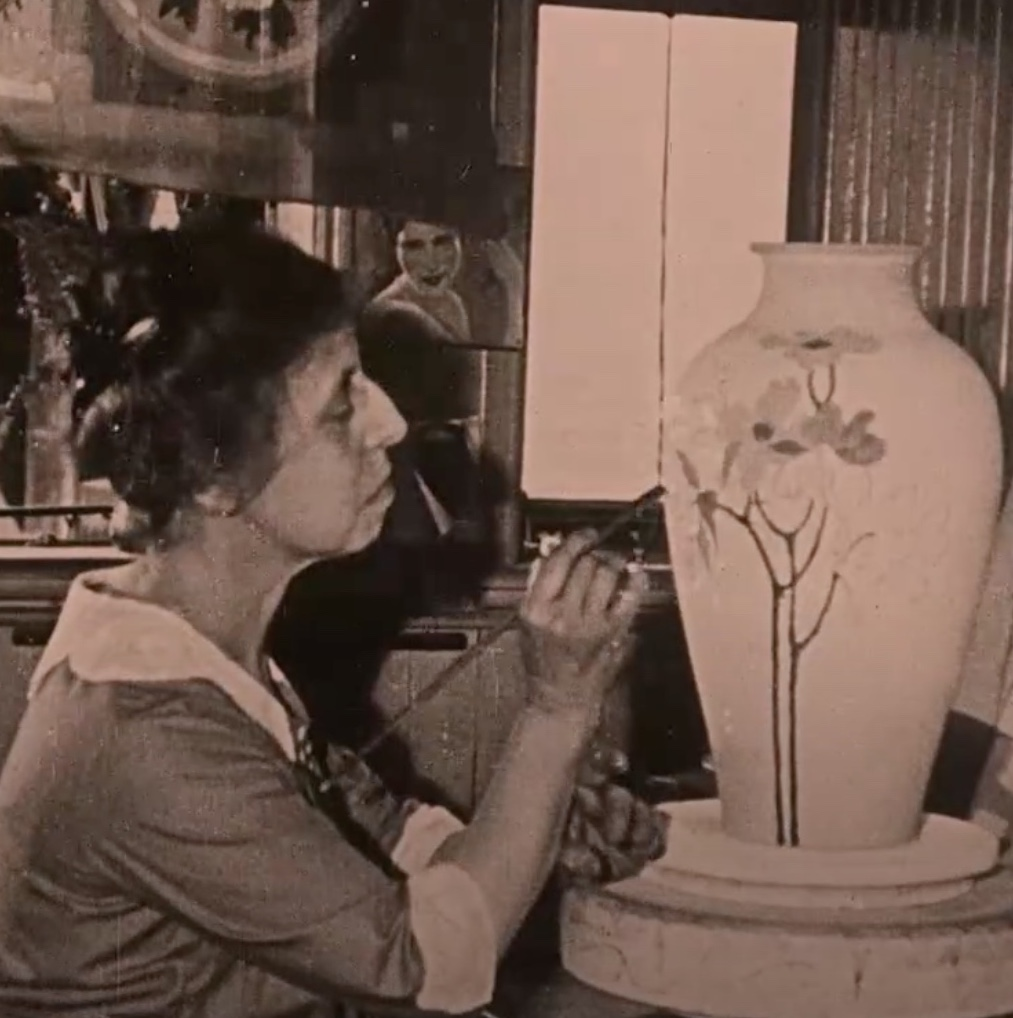
- Sara Sax (1925) decorating a vase
- Born: November 1, 1870; Cincinnati, Ohio, United States
- Died: September 9, 1949 (aged 78); Cincinnati, Ohio, United States
- Other name: Sarah Sax
- Occupations: Decorative artist, designer
- Known for: Pottery, vellum plaque paintings
- Movement: Arts and Crafts movement, Art Nouveau

Sara Sax (1870–1949) was an American decorative artist and designer, known for her work in ceramics, and scenic landscape paintings on vellum. She was one of the staff at the Rookwood Pottery Company of Cincinnati. Sax was acclaimed for her hand painted floral and peacock feather motifs on ceramics, and her mastery of glazing. She also went by Sarah Sax.

== Biography ==
Sara Sax was born November 1, 1870, in Cincinnati, Ohio, and was the daughter of Selina (née Harris) and Moritz Sax.

She was part of the staff at Rookwood Pottery Company of Cincinnati, from 1896 to 1931. Sax was on the forefront of the Arts and Crafts movement, and her contributions elevated the standing of Rookwood Pottery. Her use of the glaze French Red was of particular note, and was used almost exclusively by Sax. She was constantly working with the latest glazes and technology. Sax was an early user of the translucent vellum glaze, and experimented with combining the vellum glaze with relief carved slip decorations.

Sax's work has been part of exhibitions, including the Clark Art Institute (1993) in Williamstown, Massachusetts; and the Kansas City Jewish Museum (2002) in Leawood, Kansas.

Her pottery work can be found in public collections at the Metropolitan Museum of Art in New York City; the Philadelphia Museum of Art; the Cincinnati Art Museum; the Indianapolis Museum of Art; and the Art Institute of Chicago.

Selected works by Sax

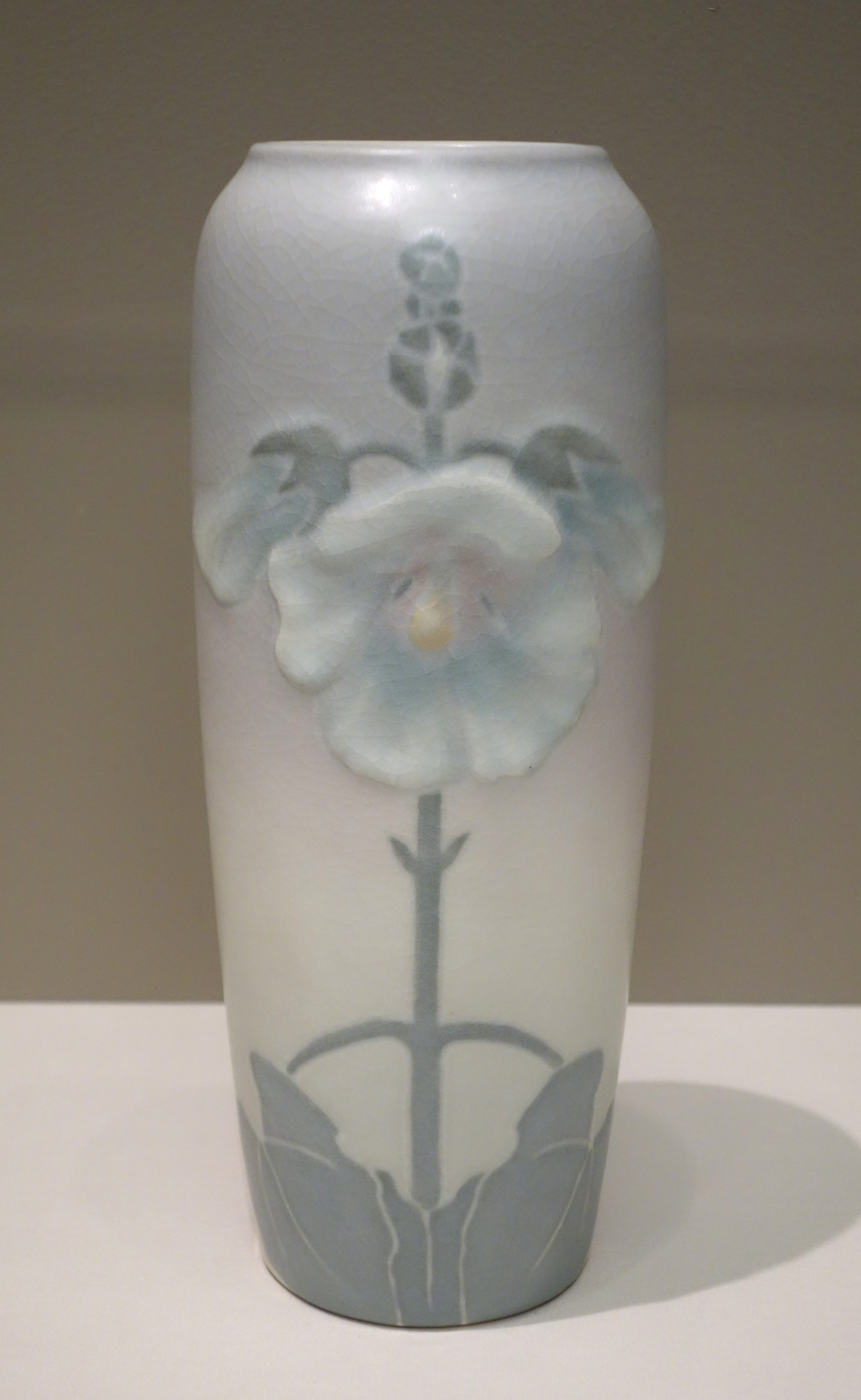

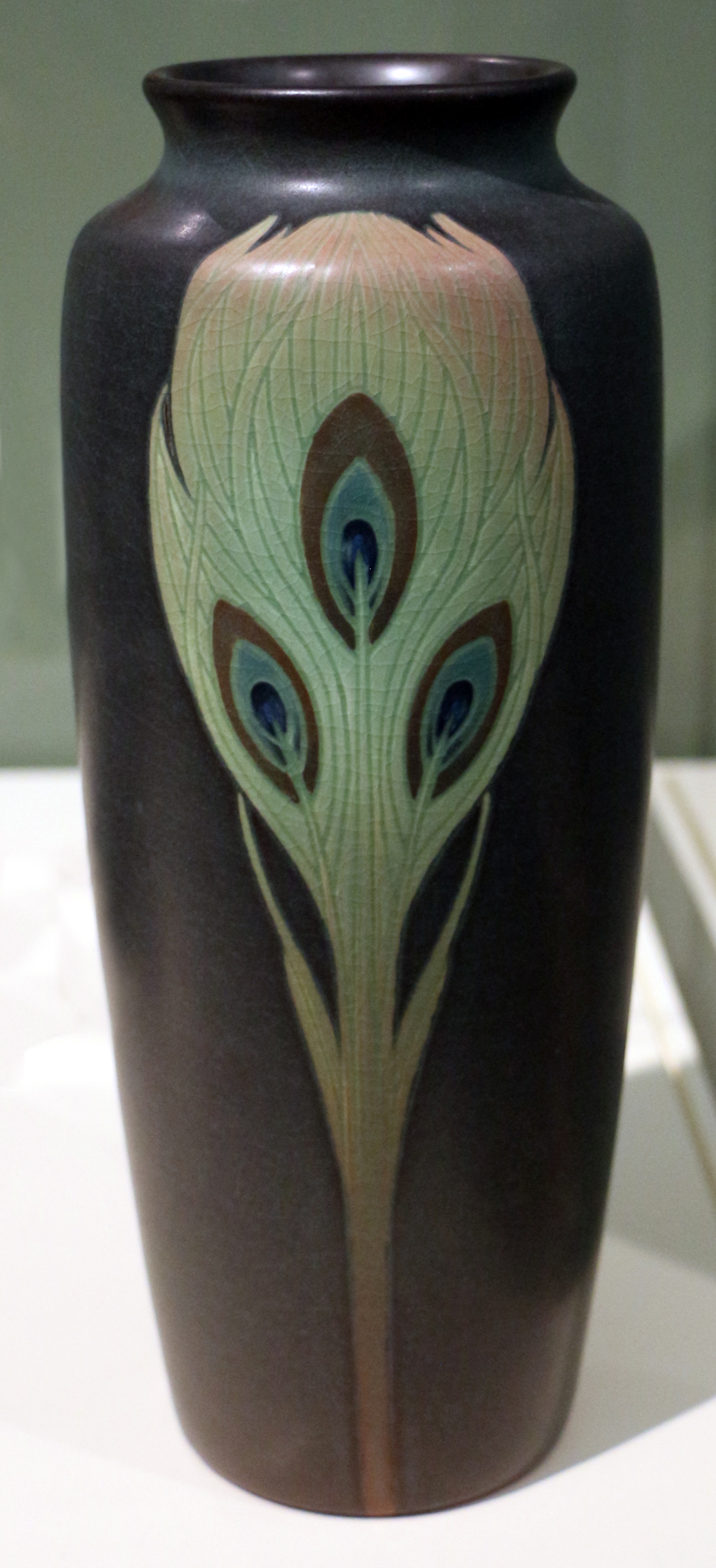

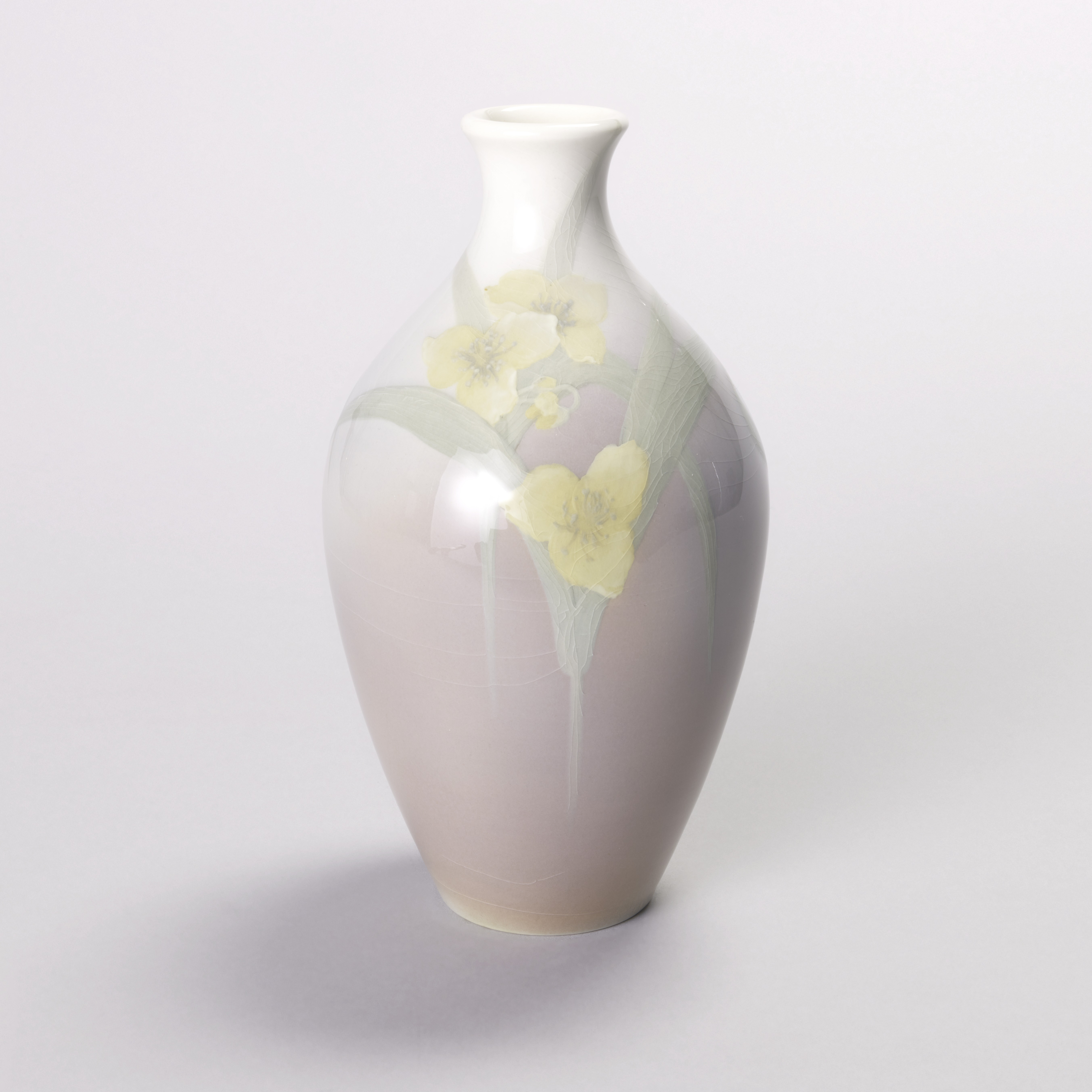

== See also ==
- Kataro Shirayamadani
