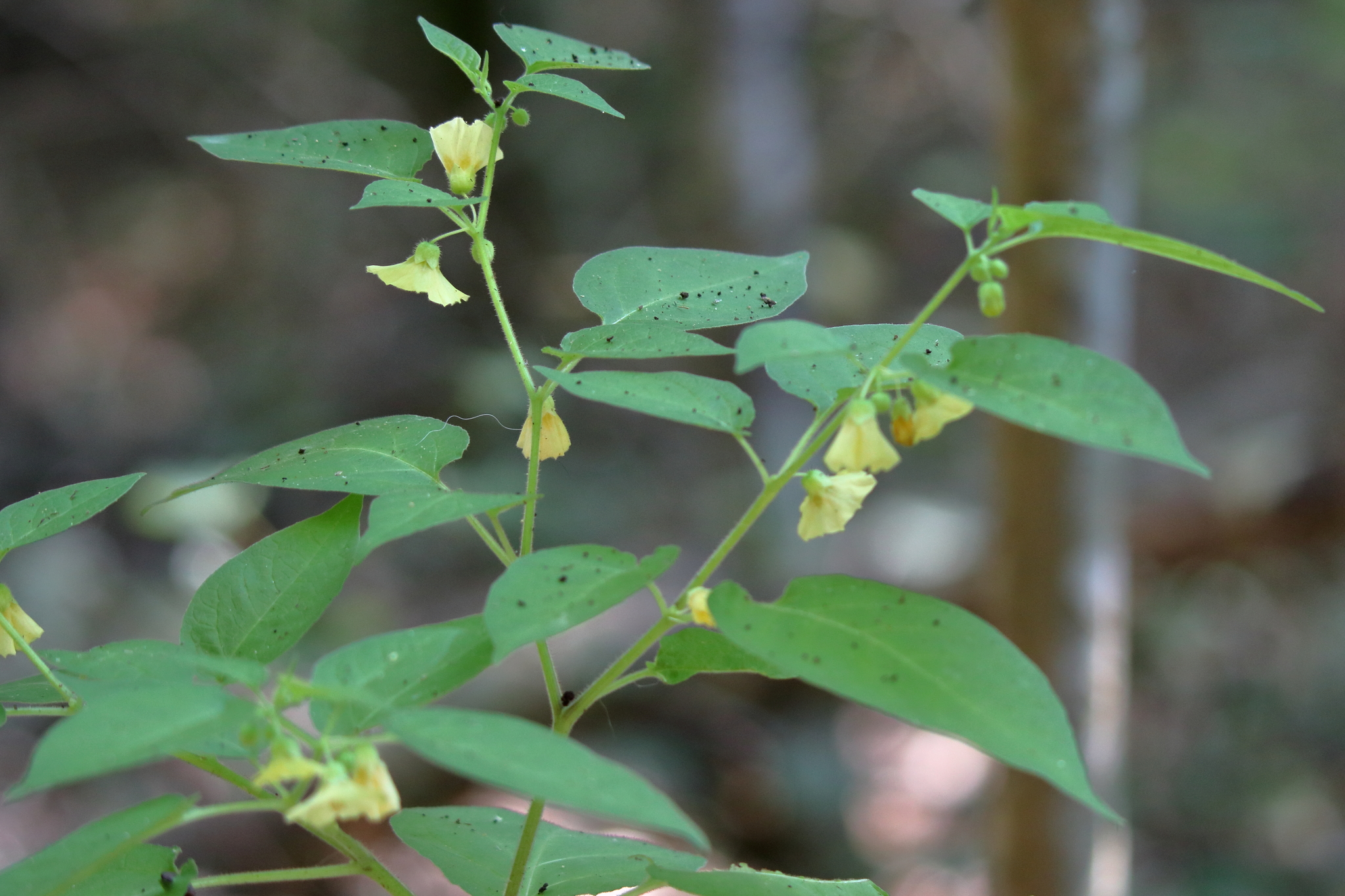

Scientific classification
- Kingdom: Plantae
- Clade: Tracheophytes
- Clade: Angiosperms
- Clade: Eudicots
- Clade: Asterids
- Order: Solanales
- Family: Solanaceae
- Genus: Calliphysalis; Whitson
- Species: C. carpenteri

Binomial name
- Calliphysalis carpenteri (Riddell) Whitson

Synonyms
- Physalis carpenteri Riddell

= Calliphysalis =

Carpenter's groundcherry

Species of edible flowering plant

Calliphysalis is a monotypic genus of perennial plants in the Physaleae tribe of the nightshade family Solanaceae. Calliphysalis carpenteri, known as Carpenter's groundcherry, is the only recognized member of the genus. C. carpenteri is native to sandy soils on the coastal plain regions of south-eastern North America from northern Florida to Louisiana and Arkansas, it was first described from specimens collected in West Feliciana Parish, Louisiana. Its species name honors the botanical contributions of early Louisiana naturalist William Marbury Carpenter (1811-1848).

== Taxonomy ==
Prior to 2012, this species was known as Physalis carpenteri. At that time it was placed in a new genus, Calliphysalis, based on chromosomal, molecular, morphological, and phylogenetic data that demonstrated its uniqueness.

Among the physalid species, Carpenter's groundcherry is believed to be most closely related to Alkekengi officinarum (formerly Physalis alkekengi).

== Uses ==
The Plants for a Future project notes that Calliphysalis carpenteri belongs to a genus (referring to Physalis, where it was formerly placed), which includes members with poisonous leaves and stems, although the fully ripe fruits are usually edible, and give it an Edibility Rating of 2 out of 5, with no medicinal value or other uses noted.
