= Kenton Hills Porcelains =

High-fired soft paste porcelain products

Kenton Hills Porcelains, Inc.
- Industry: Ceramic manufacturing
- Founded: 1939
- Founder: Harold Bopp
- Defunct: 1944
- Fate: Defunct
- Headquarters: Erlanger, Kentucky, United States of America
- Key people: Julian Bechtold; Harold Bopp; Arthur Conant; William E. Hentschel; David Seyler; Rosemary Dickman Seyler
- Products: Porcelains

Kenton Hills Porcelains were high-fired soft paste porcelain products manufactured by Kenton Hills Porcelains, Inc. Ceramics were produced from 1940 to 1943 in Erlanger, Kentucky, with sales continuing to 1944. All ceramic products were made from native clays. Products include vases, bookends, figurines, lamp bases, and flowerpots.

== Founding ==
Harold Bopp, a ceramic engineer, began working for Rookwood Pottery in Cincinnati, Ohio in 1929 as the head of the chemistry and color department. Shortly after being hired, Bopp became superintendent of all Rookwood facilities. In 1939, Bopp approached the company's president John D. Wareham with ideas for helping the failing company. The Great Depression was largely to blame for Rookwood's financial problems, but Bopp believed that selling more to wholesalers, thus reducing inventory, would increase cash flow and allow the company to make upgrades to the company's manufacturing processes.

Wareham was an artist and not business-minded. He rejected Bopp's suggestions and Bopp resigned from Rookwood. He and several other former employees discussed creating a new pottery that would incorporate Bopp's ideas for the foundering Rookwood company.

Bopp established the Harold F. Bopp Manufacturing Company and selected a location on U.S. Route 25 (Dixie Highway) in Erlanger, Kentucky. According to the trademark application, the first products intended for sale were begun on January 22, 1940. In May 1940, the first large amount of pottery was fired in the kiln.

== Production and marketing ==
Kenton Hills Porcelains, Inc. officially opened for business on November 11, 1940. Production and output from the company was brisk during the first year of operation. The company had marketing agreements with Nieman-Marcus in Dallas, Marshall Field's in Chicago, Gump in San Francisco, Halle Brothers Co. in Cleveland, and Lord & Taylor, Tiffany & Co., and Georg Jensen Company, all in New York City.

Distribution of Kenton Hills Porcelains was under contract of Schoemaker & Company, Inc. of New York, serving as representatives of the company for outlet stores.

== Artists and production staff ==
Many of the staff involved with Kenton Hills Porcelains were friends or relatives of the owners and not all of their names have been documented. The following individuals were involved with glaze production, decoration, mold making, shape sculpting, firing or a combination of several of these tasks.

- Julian F. Bechtold (1896–1955)
- Harold F. Bopp (1900–1986)
- Paul Chidlaw (1900–1989)
- Arthur Pabodic Conant (1889–1966)
- Raymond "Ray" Frank Dawson (1889–1965)
- Rose Mary (Brunner) Dickman (1887–1980)
- Charlotte Haupt
- Alza (Stratton) Hentschel (1911–1982)
- William "Billy" Ernst Hentschel (1892–1962)
- Leo Murphy
- Harold Nash
- John Reichardt (1894–1965)
- John Schneider
- David Warren Seyler (1917–2010)
- Rosemary (Dickman) Seyler (1916–2006)
- Mayo Moore Taylor (1893–1980)

== Demise ==
All production of Kenton Hills Porcelains ceased in early 1943 when the kilns were last fired. They were only sporadically fired in 1942. Seyler had enlisted in the U.S. Navy in 1942 and Bopp left for a job with Corning Glass that same year. Dawson and Reichardt went to work for the war defense industry. Hentschel returned to the Cincinnati Art Academy full-time. The Kenton Hills Porcelains production facility, including the kilns, was leased to the U.S. Army for storage of defense materials. Following the war, the facility was found to be in great disrepair and the kilns were contaminated. Despite all of these setbacks, Rosemary Dickman Seyler was able to keep the Kenton Hills Porcelains salesroom open into 1944.

Schoemaker & Company failed to deliver the last shipment of Kenton Hills wares to the outlet stores, and subsequent litigation to recover the financial losses was never resolved. The last Kenton Hills glazed pots were sold to the Crest Lamp Company.

It was estimated by David and Rosemary Seyler that the company produced 10,000-15,000 total pieces during its three years of operation. Unlike other art potteries, Kenton Hills Porcelains sold no "factory seconds".

== Museum collections ==
Although scarce, Kenton Hills Porcelains have been acquired by several museums. Most notably is the largest public collection held by the Behringer-Crawford Museum in Covington, Kentucky. The Speed Art Museum in Louisville also owns several pieces.

== See also ==
- Bybee Pottery
- Louisville Stoneware
- Rookwood Pottery
