= Kevin Auzenne =

American artist

- Born: 1971 (age 54–55); Mt. Pleasant, Michigan, United States
- Occupation: Painter
- Website: kevinauzenne.com

"Untitled (Fools Always Coming)" by Kevin Auzenne, 2021. Acrylic and charcoal on canvas.

Kevin Auzenne (born 1971) is an American painter based out of Cincinnati, Ohio. Known for his intricately layered paintings and drawings, Auzenne has exhibited work across the United States, including at the Cincinnati Art Museum.

== Early life ==
Auzenne was born in Mount Pleasant, Michigan, and grew up in Tallahassee, Florida. He attended both the Rochester Institute of Technology and the Florida State University School of Motion Picture and Recording Arts, where he studied film and photography.

== Career ==
In 1996 Auzenne moved to Brooklyn, where he worked as a scenic carpenter and did various freelance work in the film, television, and art industry. He also became active with artist communities, sharing studio space and collaborating with others.

In 2014, Auzenne moved to Cincinnati, where he now lives and works. He served for a time as artist in residence at Cincinnati-based Rookwood Pottery Company, with whom he collaborated to make a number of pieces. In 2023, Auzenne was awarded the Ohio Arts Council Excellence in Painting grant.

Auzenne's influences include Japanese calligraphy and Surrealist techniques. His work often references "loose narrative structures," popular culture, and historical figures, as well as his personal identity as an African American with French Creole heritage.
