= Anna Marie Valentien =

American painter (1862–1947)

- Born: Anna Marie Bookprinter; February 27, 1862; Cincinnati, Ohio
- Died: August 25, 1947 (aged 85); San Diego, California
- Known for: Pottery, Sculpture
- Movement: Arts and Crafts movement
- Spouse: Albert Robert Valentien (m. 1887)

Anna Marie Valentien (February 27, 1862 – August 25, 1947) (or Valentine), née Buchdrucker (or Bookprinter) was an American sculptor, painter, teacher, illustrator, and decorator.

== Early years ==
Anna's parents, Karl and Magdalene Bookprinter, emigrated from Germany in 1848, a year, that because of the failed revolutions of 1848 brought large numbers of Germans, known as Forty-Eighters, to Cincinnati where a German community already existed. She began her art studies at the McMichen School of Design and later attended evening classes at the Cincinnati Art Academy, studying portraiture with Frank Duveneck and sculpture with Louis Rebisso. After her marriage, she travelled with her husband to Paris where she studied sculpture, first enrolled at the Académie Colarossi, where she worked with Jean Antoine Injalbert, and then at the Académie Rodin under Auguste Rodin, Antoine Bourdelle and Jules Desbois.

== Career ==
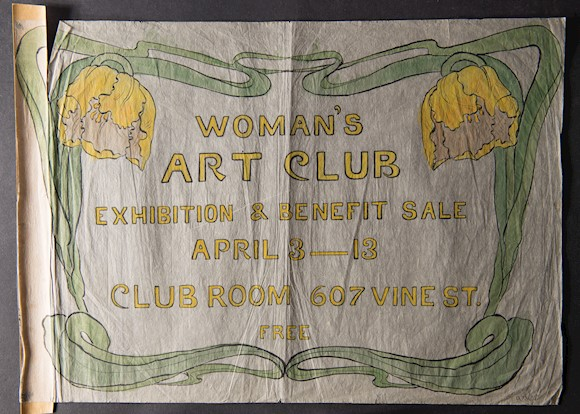
Invitation to an exhibition at the Woman's Art Club of Cincinnati by Anna Marie Valentien

Returning from her European studies she was employed at the Rookwood Pottery Company in Cincinnati from 1884 until 1905. There she met Rockwood's chief artist Albert Robert Valentien; they were married on June 1, 1887.

In 1893 she showed a piece, Ariadne, in The Woman's Building at the World's Columbian Exposition.

After their retirement from Rookwood the Valentiens moved to San Diego, California where they continued their artistic endeavors and remained for the rest of their lives. They briefly ran an art pottery studio in San Diego, Valentien Pottery, from 1911 to 1914, while each continued to pursue individual work, he in painting and she in sculpture and other media. She taught sculpture and handcrafts at the San Diego Evening High School, from 1917 until 1938. Among her students were the sculptor Donal Hord and the painter Dorr Bothwell.

She was awarded two gold medals at the Panama–California Exposition.

The exhibition catalog “Beyond Rookwood: Paintings By Anna M. Valentien, Prints And Plates By E. T. Hurley ” was published by the Cincinnati Art Galleries in 2001.

Valentien died in San Diego, California August 25, 1947.

== Work ==
Several of Valentien's paintings and sculptures can be found at the San Diego Historical Society

- a portrait “Mrs. Matt Daly” is in the Cincinnati Art Museum collection.
