= Kataro Shirayamadani =

Japanese American ceramic painter

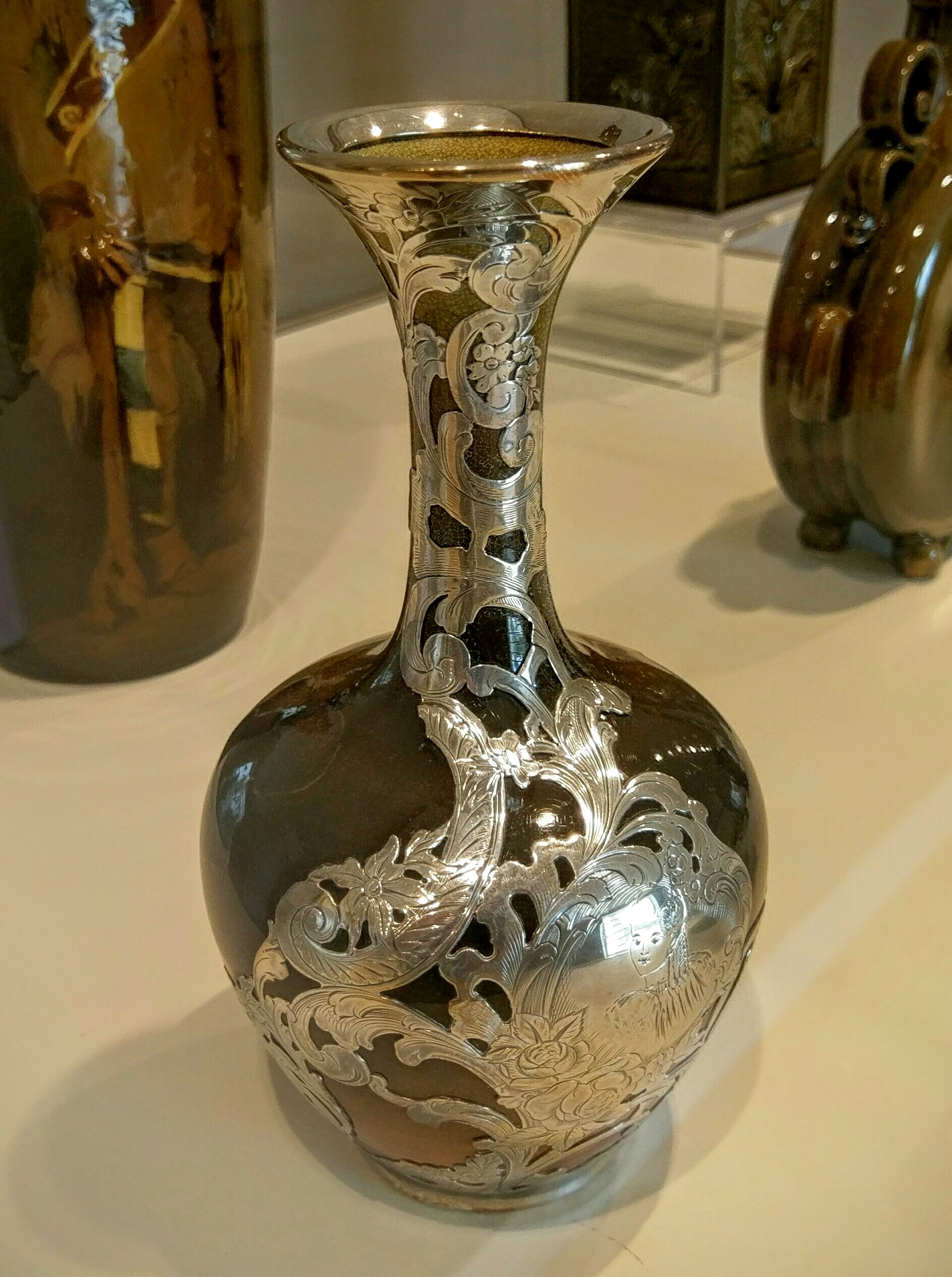
A ceramic vase with silver overlay made by Shirayamadani for Rookwood Pottery in 1892

Kataro Shirayamadani (Shirayamadani Kitarō 白山谷 喜太郎; 1865–1948), also known as Kitaro Shirayamadani, was a Japanese American decorative ceramics painter who worked for Rookwood Pottery in Cincinnati, Ohio from 1887 until 1948.

== Life ==
Shirayamadani was born in 1865, in Tokyo, Japan.

He was already an accomplished painter of porcelainware when he came to the United States. He worked in Boston for the Fujiyama porcelain decorating workshop when he first met Maria Longworth Nichols Storer, the founder of Rookwood Pottery Company, in 1886. She hired him to work for her at Rookwood in May, 1887.

A vase he made won a Grand Prize at the 1900 Paris Exposition Universelle. The vase was acquired by the Philadelphia Museum of Art in 1901 and is still in its collection.

He decorated table lamp bases that were combined with stained glass shades made by Tiffany Studios, and one such lamp is in the collection of the Los Angeles County Museum of Art.

== Museum collections ==
His work is in many museum collections, including the Philadelphia Museum of Art, the Mint Museum, the Carnegie Museum of Art, the Cooper Hewitt, Smithsonian Design Museum, the Los Angeles County Museum of Art, the Metropolitan Museum of Art, the Museum of the American Arts and Crafts Movement, and the Crocker Art Museum.

== Legacy ==
In 1991 one of his pieces from 1900 sold for $198,000. Bonham's Auction House auctioned several Rookwood Pieces by Shirayamadani in April 2010.

== See also ==
- Sara Sax
