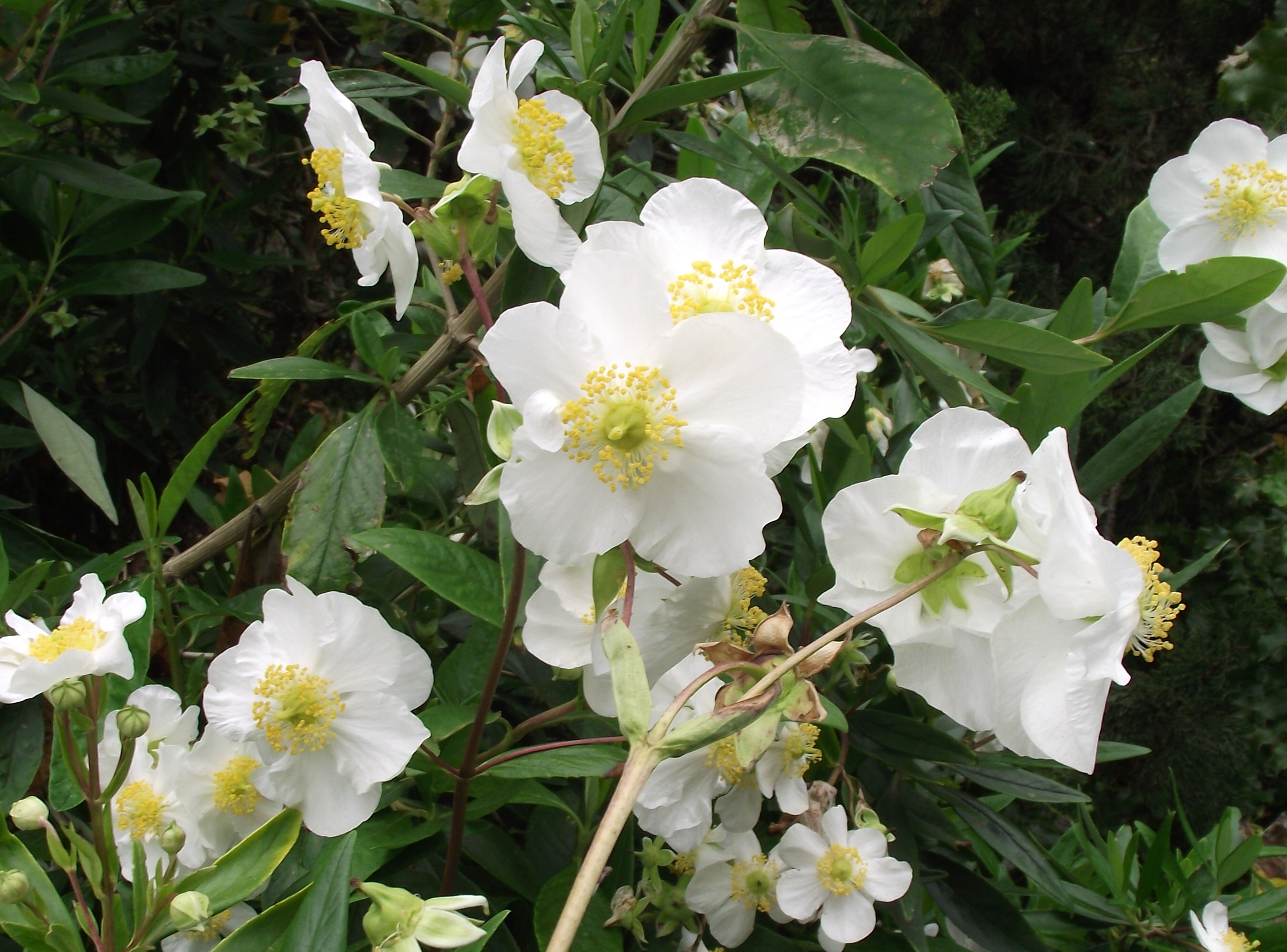

Conservation status
- Critically Imperiled (NatureServe)

Scientific classification
- Kingdom: Plantae
- Clade: Tracheophytes
- Clade: Angiosperms
- Clade: Eudicots
- Clade: Asterids
- Order: Cornales
- Family: Hydrangeaceae
- Subfamily: Hydrangeoideae
- Tribe: Philadelpheae
- Genus: Carpenteria; Torr.
- Species: C. californica

Binomial name
- Carpenteria californica Torr.

= Carpenteria =

Genus of flowering plants

Carpenteria /ˌkɑːrpənˈtɪəriə ˌkælɪˈfɔːrnɪkə/, the tree anemone or bush anemone, is a genus of flowering plants in the hydrangea family Hydrangeaceae. It is closely related to the similar genus Philadelphus and is monotypic, being represented by the single species Carpenteria californica which is a flowering evergreen shrub native to the Sierra Nevada foothills in California.

== Eponym ==
The genus was named in honor of Dr. William Marbury Carpenter, a noted botanist from Louisiana.

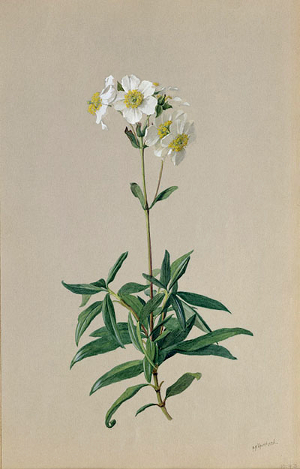
Watercolor of Carpenteria californica by Albert Robert Valentien.

== Description ==
Carpenteria californica grows to 1–3 m (3 ft 3 in – 9 ft 10 in) tall, with flaky bark on older stems. The leaves are opposite, lanceolate, 4–10 cm (2–4 in) long and 1–2.5 cm (0.4–1.0 in) broad, glossy green above, blue-green to whitish and downy beneath.

The sweetly-scented flowers are 3–7 cm (1–3 in) across with five to eight pure white petals and a cluster of yellow stamens. It flowers from late spring to midsummer. The fruit is a leathery capsule 6–12 mm (1/4–1/2 in) in diameter, containing numerous seeds.

== Distribution and habitat ==
The bush anemone is a rare species, endemic to only seven sites in Fresno and Madera Counties, where it grows in chaparral and oak woodlands at 340–1,340 m (1,115–4,396 ft) altitude, between the San Joaquin River and Kings River. It is well adapted to wildfire, reproducing by stump sprouts after burning. Natural seedlings are rare.

== Cultivation ==
Carpenteria californica is cultivated as an ornamental plant, grown for its lush foliage, large scented flowers and drought tolerance. It is used in traditional and wildlife gardens in subtropical and temperate locations in the northern hemisphere. It is hardy down to −10 °C (14 °F) in sheltered locations in full sun.

It has been in cultivation since 1875, and is now much more common in gardens than in its natural habitat. It first flowered in England for the famed plantswoman Gertrude Jekyll at Godalming in 1885.

Cultivars include:

- 'Bodnant' — cold-tolerant cultivar, hardy to −15 °C (5 °F) in the British Isles
- 'Elizabeth' — masses of smaller white flowers, more compact growth habit
- 'Ladham's' — large flowers

The cultivars 'Elizabeth' and 'Bodnant' have gained the Royal Horticultural Society's Award of Garden Merit.
