= Physalin =

Physalins are steroidal constituents of Physalis plants which possess an unusual 13,14-seco-16,24-cyclo-steroidal ring skeleton (where the bond that is normally present between the 13 and 14 positions in other steroids is broken while a new bond between positions 16 and 24 is formed; see figure below). Since the isolation and the structure determination of Physalin A and Physalin B in 1969, more than a dozen Physalins were isolated from Physalis species, Physalis alkekengi, Physalis angulata, and Physalis lancifolia. These compounds have antimicrobial, and antiparasitic effects.

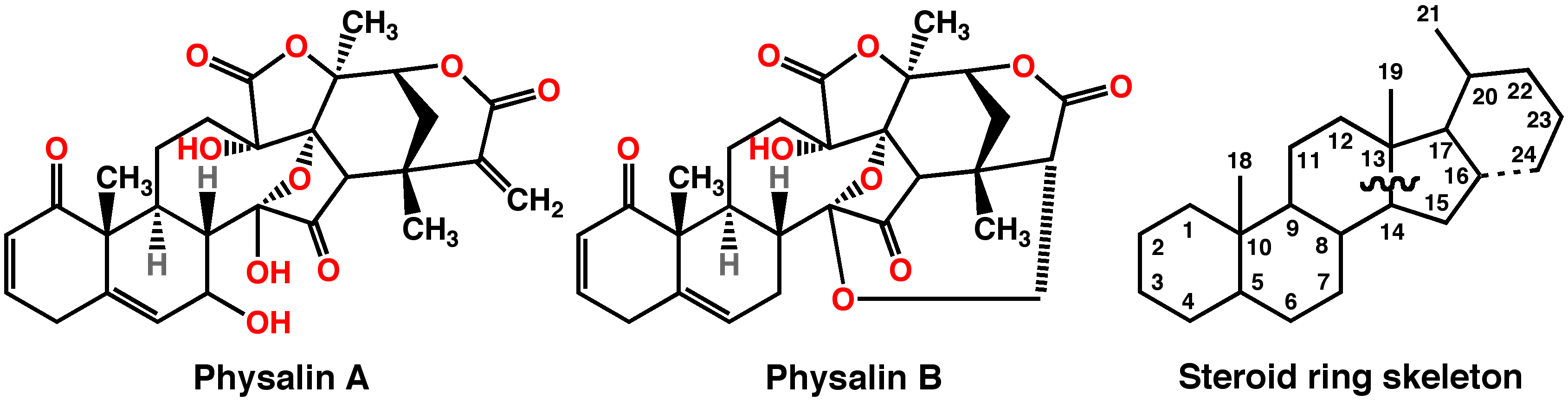
Chemical structures of Physalins A and B (left and middle respectively) and of the prototypical steroid ring skeleton (right) in which the atoms in the latter are numbered for reference. Ring bonds that differ between typical steroids and the physalins are represented by a wavy line (bond breaking) and a dashed line (bond forming).
