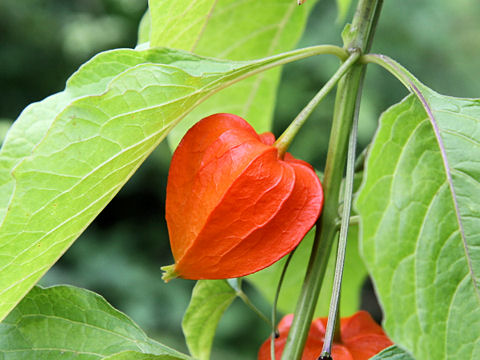
- Alkekengi officinarum fruit with the red husk

Scientific classification
- Kingdom: Plantae
- Clade: Tracheophytes
- Clade: Angiosperms
- Clade: Eudicots
- Clade: Asterids
- Order: Solanales
- Family: Solanaceae
- Subfamily: Solanoideae
- Tribe: Physaleae
- Genus: Alkekengi; Mill.
- Species: A. officinarum

Binomial name
- Alkekengi officinarum Moench

Synonyms
- Physalis alkekengi L.; Boberella alkekengi (L.) E.H.L.Krause; Physalis alkekengi var. anthoxantha H. Lév.; Physalis alkekengi var. orientalis Pamp.; Physalis ciliata Siebold & Zucc.; Physalis halicacabum Crantz; Physalis hyemalis Salisb.; Physalis kansuensis Pojark.

= Alkekengi =

Species of edible flowering plant native to Eurasia

Alkekengi is a monotypic genus of flowering plants in the nightshade family Solanaceae with a single species Alkekengi officinarum. This species is native to the regions covering Southern Europe to South Asia and Northeast Asia.

It is commonly known as the bladder cherry, Chinese lantern, Japanese-lantern, strawberry groundcherry, winter cherry, alchechengi berry, or Klabuster cherry.

It is a close relative of the new world Calliphysalis carpenteri (Carpenter's groundcherry) and a somewhat more distant relative to the members of the Physalis genus.

== Description ==
It is easily identifiable by the large, bright orange to red papery calyx covering over its fruit, which resembles paper lanterns. It is a perennial herbaceous plant growing to 40–60 cm (16–24 in) tall, with spirally arranged leaves 6–12 cm (2 1/2–4 1/2 in) long and 4–9 cm (1 1/2–3 1/2 in) broad. The flowers are white, with a five-lobed corolla 10–15 mm (3/8–5/8 in) across, with an inflated basal calyx which matures into the papery orange fruit covering, 4–5 cm (1 1/2–2 in) long and broad. And it has one variety, Alkekengi officinarum var. franchetii.

Research has shown Calliphysalis carpenteri (formerly classified as Physalis carpenteri) to be among the most closely related species to Physalis alkekengi.

== Cultivation ==
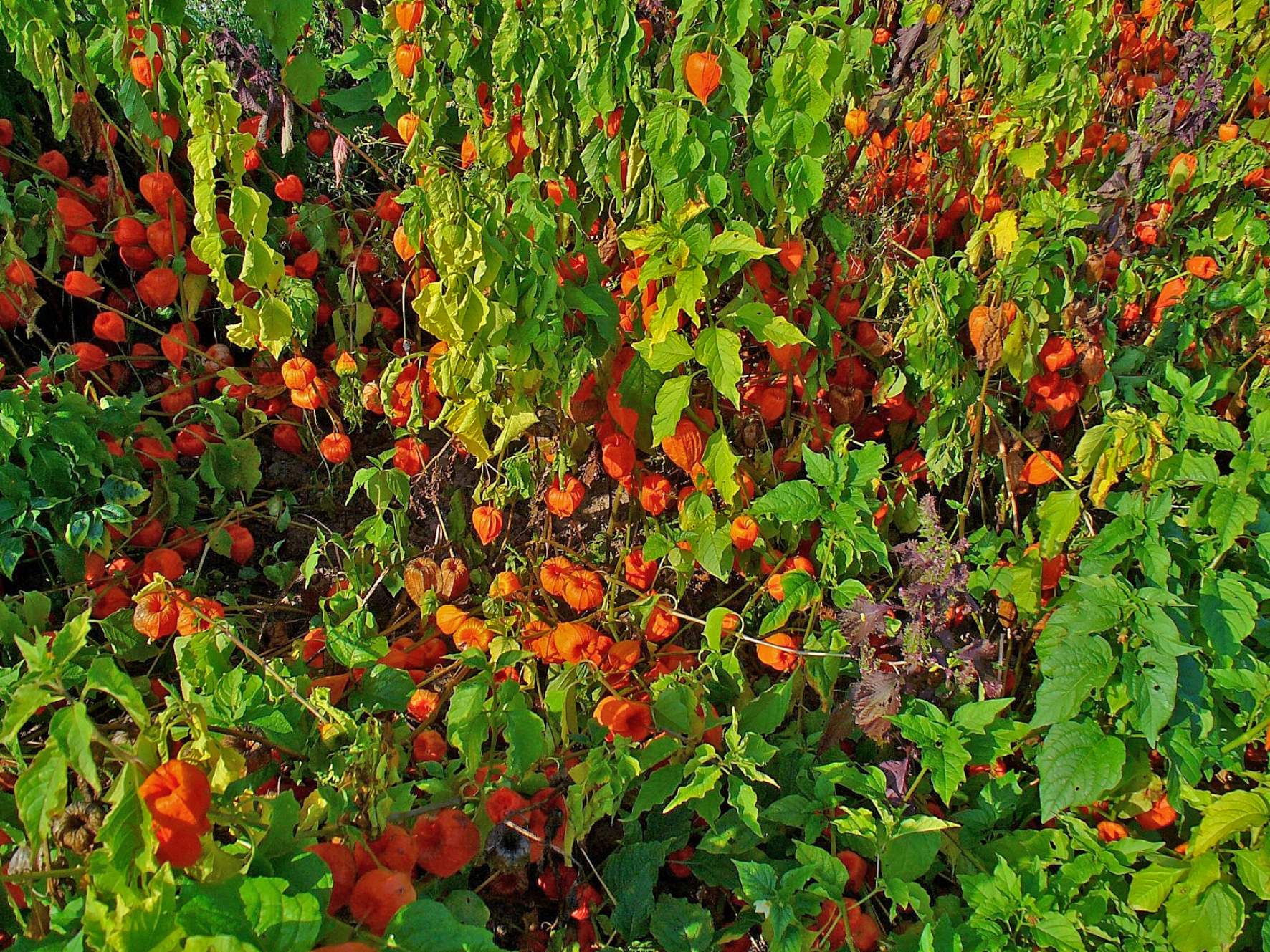
Mature plant

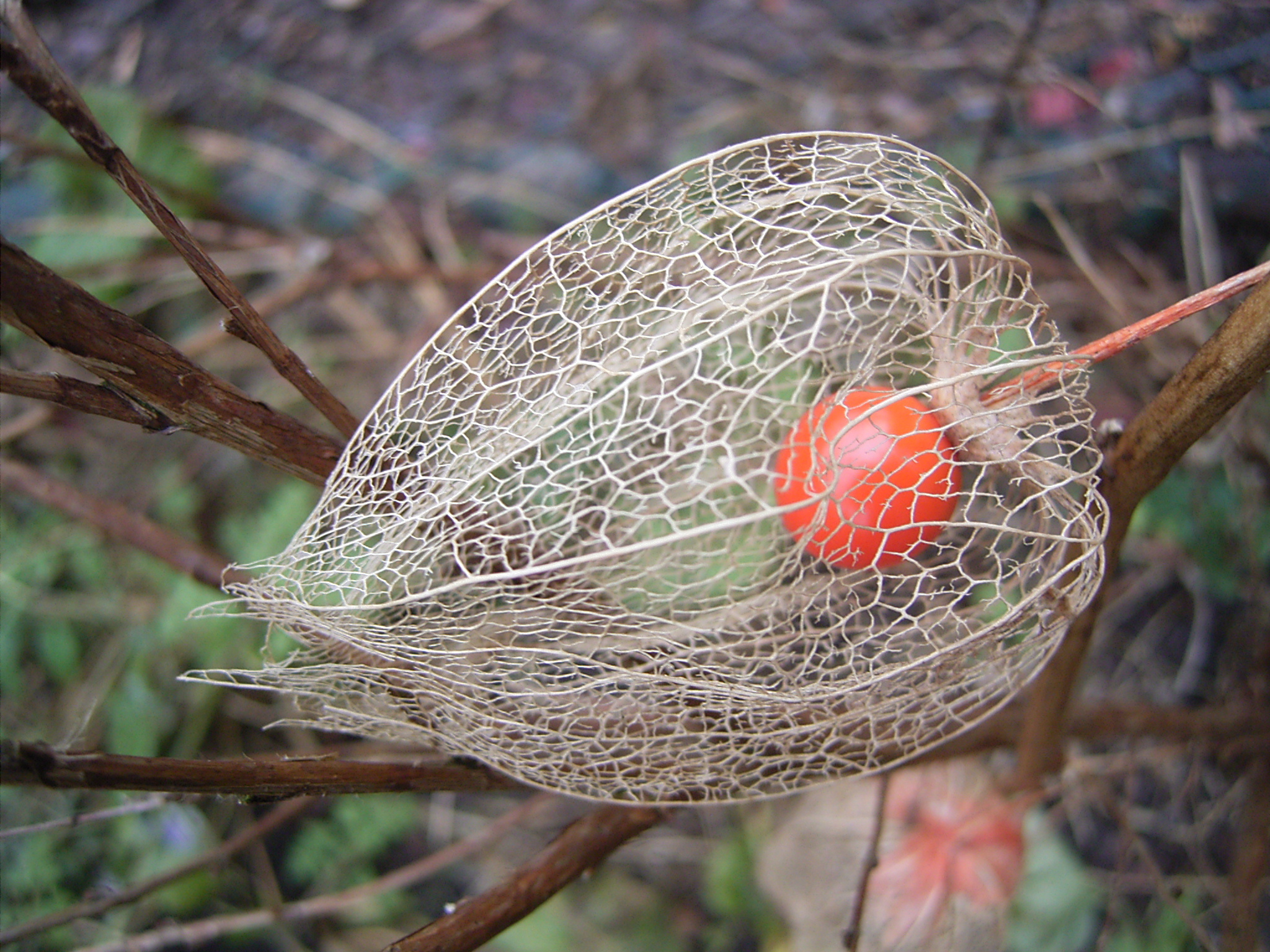
The orange "lanterns" (fruiting calyces) of Alkekengi officinarum lose their bright colour and papery appearance during the winter, and by the spring become delicately beautiful, skeletal networks of beige veins revealing the orange-red berries within.

It is a popular ornamental plant, widely cultivated in temperate regions of the world, and very hardy to below −20 °C (−4 °F). It can be invasive with its wide-spreading root system sending up new shoots some distance from where it was originally planted. In various places around the world, it has escaped from cultivation.

In the United Kingdom it has been given the Royal Horticultural Society's Award of Garden Merit.

== History ==
Physalis alkekengi has been used for a wide range of purposes in traditional medicine for around two millennia. It was used, purportedly to heal fever, induce mental serenity, and assist in childbirth, according to ancient Chinese books including the Erya and Shen Nong Ben Cao Jing. Its usage in reducing heat, boosting energy, and aiding in diuresis was also mentioned in Li Shizhen's Ming dynasty Compendium of Materia Medica. The plant's juice was thought to be useful in treating jaundice.

The English herbalist John Gerard describes a plant known as red winter cherries in his late 16th-century herbal, which may refer to Alkekengi officinarum. He says that the plant is also called red nightshade and alkakengie in English. It is kept in gardens and the berries are used as traditional medicine.

== Traditional uses ==
The dried fruit is called the golden flower in the Unani system of medicine, and used as a diuretic, antiseptic, liver corrective, and sedative.

In Chinese medicine, Alkekengi is used to treat such conditions as abscesses, coughs, fevers, and sore throat. The extinct Dacian language has left few traces, but in De Materia Medica by Pedanius Dioscorides, a plant called Strychnos alikakabos (Στρύχνος άλικακάβος) is discussed, which was called kykolis (or cycolis) by the Dacians. Some have considered this plant to be Alkekengi officinarum, but the name more likely refers to ashwagandha (Withania somnifera).

== Chemical constituents ==
Alkekengi officinarum contains a wide variety of physalins. When isolated from the plant, these have antibacterial and leishmanicidal activities in vitro.

It also contains caffeic acid ethyl ester, 25,27-dehydro-physalin L, physalin D, and cuneataside E.

More than 530 different chemicals, including steroids, flavonoids, alkaloids, phenylpropanoids, sucrose esters, piperazines, volatile oils, polysaccharides, amino acids, and trace elements, are present in Physalis alkekengi.

== Cultural significance ==
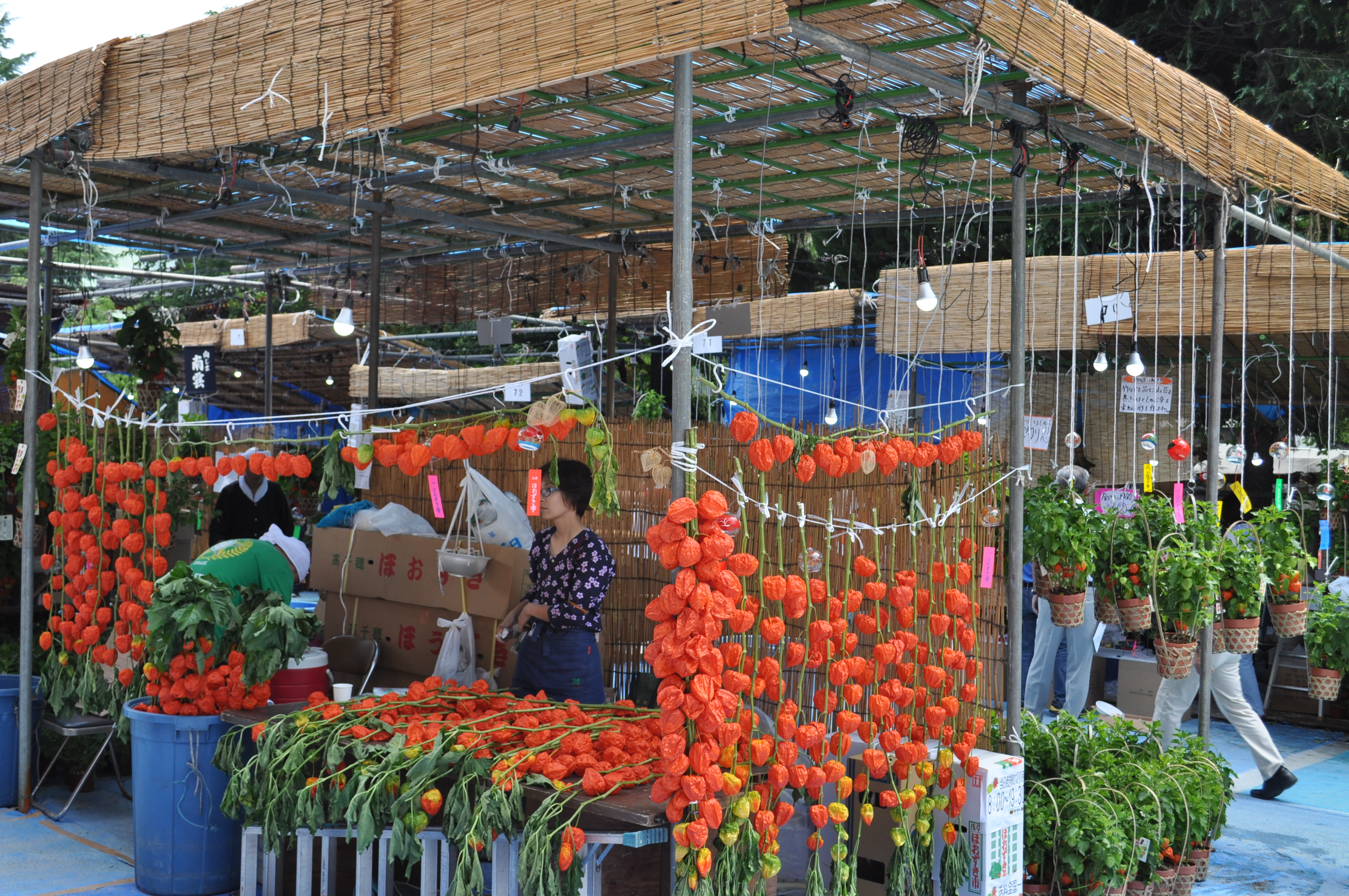
Hozuki Market in Japan

In Japan, its bright and lantern-like fruiting calyces form a traditional part of the Bon Festival as offerings intended to help guide the souls of the dead. A market devoted to it – hōzuki-ichi – is held every year on 9–10 July near the ancient Buddhist temple of Sensō-ji in Asakusa.

== Fossil record ==
Alkekengi seed fossils are known from Miocene of Siberia, Pliocene of Europe and Pleistocene of Germany. Pollen grains of Alkekengi officinarum have been found in early Pleistocene sediments in Ludham east of Wroxham, East Anglia.

== Taxonomic history ==
Alkekengi officinarum was previously included in the genus Physalis until molecular and genetic evidence placed it as the type species of a new genus.
