= William Marbury Carpenter =

American physician

- Born: 25 June 1811; Feliciana Parish, Louisiana, US
- Died: 4 October 1848 (aged 37); New Orleans, Orleans Parish, Louisiana
- Education: U.S. Military Academy, 1829-1831, University of Louisiana Medical College, M.D., 1836
- Years active: 1838–1848
- Known for: Physician, Naturalist and Professor
- Parent(s): James and Ann S. (Marbury) Carpenter

Dr. William Marbury Carpenter (25 June 1811, Feliciana Parish, Louisiana – 4 October 1848), a noted Southern natural scientist.

== Education ==
He was educated through private tutoring and attended the U.S. Military Academy, in West Point, New York (Class of 1833), but resigned his appointment due to ill health. He then studied medicine at the Medical College of Louisiana, graduating a Doctor of Medicine in 1836.

== Physician and Naturalist ==
He went into medical practice at Jackson, East Feliciana Parish, Louisiana and continued to pursue an interest in the natural sciences. In 1838, he published a study of a submerged forest he discovered near Port Hudson, East Baton Rouge Parish, Louisiana. In 1842, he was a professor of "materia medica" at the University of Louisiana, where he was appointed dean in 1845. In 1844, he published a study on the habit of dirt eating among Negro slaves, and he published several other significant studies. He was a leading proponent of research into disease transportability and transmission as related to importation of disease and outbreak of epidemics. He joined the faculty of the Medical College of Louisiana as Professor of Botany and Geology, and from 1845 to 1846 he was Dean of the Tulane University School of Medicine. From 1846 through 1848, he was editor of the New Orleans Medical and Surgical Journal. In early 1846, he met Sir Charles Lyell, who said of him: "His knowledge of botany and geology, as well as his amiable manners, made him a most useful and agreeable companion". His botanical collections were published posthumously and several plants were named in his honor, including the rare flowering California Bush Anemone, Carpenteria californica, which was "named in honour of Professor William M. Carpenter (1811-48), a physician from Louisiana, by its discoverer, Major General John Charles Fremont, who collected it on one of his four journeys of exploration in the extreme west of the United States between 1842 and 1848." Carpenter's Groundcherry (Physalis carpenteri Riddell, 1853 ex Rydberg, 1896), a plant in the nightshade family indigenous to Louisiana, and Carpenter's Oak, Quercus carpenteri Riddell, 1853, also indigenous to Louisiana, were named in his honor by fellow naturalist John Leonard Riddell.

== Personal ==
William Marbury Carpenter was descended from the New England Rehoboth Carpenter family. He married first on November 21, 1837, in East Feliciana Parish, Louisiana to Matilda King, who was born in St. Landry Parish, Louisiana in 1818 and died in 1848, eldest child of Valentine and Nancy (King) King, and second to Eliza King, who was born in 1826 and died in 1863, sister of Matilda. By his first wife, Dr. Carpenter had four children.
