= Albert Robert Valentien =

American artist

- (Photo: San Diego History Center)
- Born: Albert Robert Valentine; May 11, 1862; Cincinnati, Ohio, United States
- Died: August 5, 1925 (aged 63); San Diego, California
- Known for: Painting (watercolor and oil), Ceramic art
- Movement: Arts and Crafts
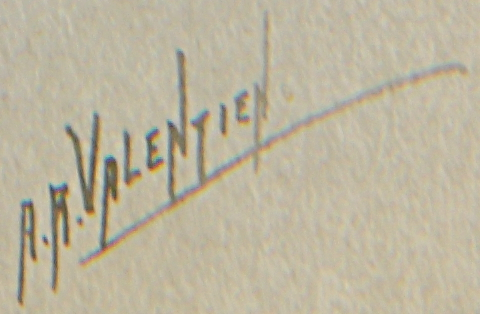

Albert Robert Valentien (1862–1925) was an American painter, botanical artist, and ceramic artist. He is best known for his work as the chief ceramics decorator at Rookwood Pottery, and for his watercolor paintings of botanical subjects. In 1908, he accepted a commission from philanthropist Ellen Browning Scripps to illustrate the botanical diversity of California. Over the next ten years, he produced approximately 1200 watercolor "plant portraits" of native California wildflowers, grasses, ferns, and trees.

== Biography ==
Valentien was born in Cincinnati, Ohio on 11 May 1862, to Anna Marie Wolter and Frederick Valentine. He studied art at the School of Design of the University of Cincinnati (later the Art Academy of Cincinnati), working with Thomas S. Noble and Frank Duveneck. With fellow student John Rettig, Valentien studied decoration of china, learning underglazed pottery decoration from T(homas) J. Wheatley.

He married artist Anna Marie Bookprinter (née Buchdrucker) in 1887.

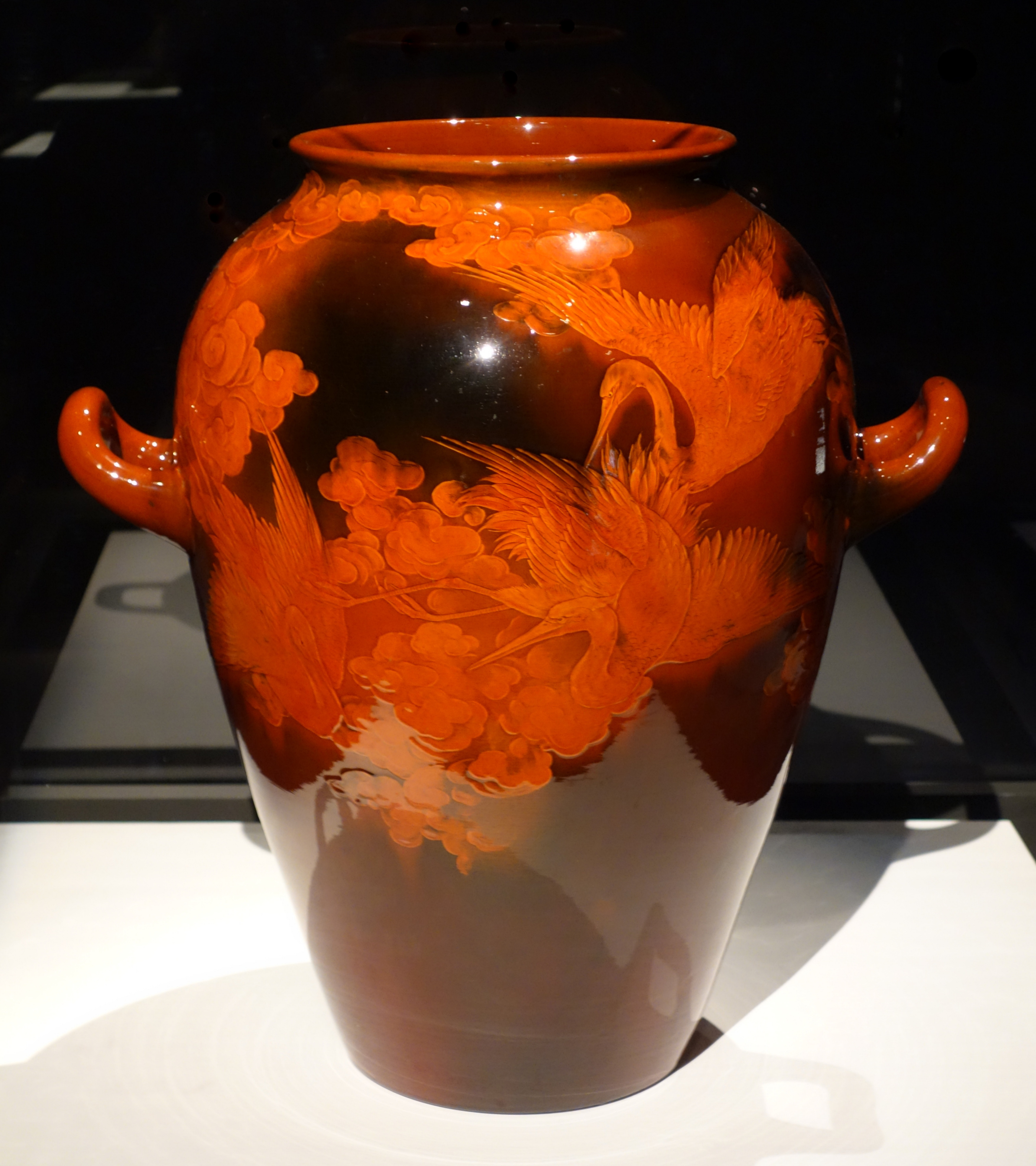
Vase by Albert Robert Valentien, for Rookwood Pottery Company, 1893, Cincinnati Art Museum collection.

=== Rookwood ===
In 1884 he joined the Rookwood Pottery Company, and led the art pottery's decoration department for the next twenty years.

In 1903, the Valentiens visited Southern California, staying several months with Anna's brother in Dulzura, a small community southeast of San Diego. During that visit, Valentien produced 135 paintings of California wildflowers, exhibiting the collection at the State Normal School in San Diego (present day San Diego State University). He also brought samples of his work to Miramar Ranch, the home of publishing magnate E.W. Scripps. Ellen Browning Scripps, his sister, noted in her diary, "Mr. Valentien here with a collection of painted wildflowers." Encouraged, Valentien decided to abandon his career as a ceramicist. He later wrote that this was "practically the ending of my pottery career."

Retiring from Rookwood in 1905, the Valentiens moved to San Diego in 1908.

=== California flora ===
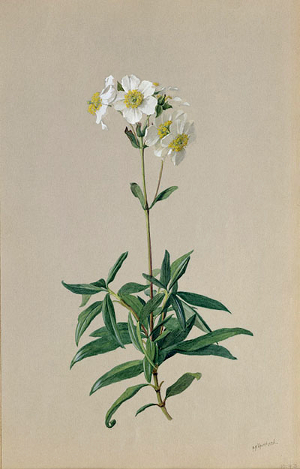
"Carpenteria californica (Tree anemone)" (c.1908–1918), Valentien Collection, San Diego Natural History Museum.

In 1908, Ellen Browning Scripps purchased Valentien's studies of goldenrod and wild aster after viewing an exhibit of his wildflower paintings at the Scripps Building in downtown San Diego. The following year, she commissioned Valentien to paint a series of illustrations of California wildflowers with the intention of publishing a compendium of the flora of California. Valentien worked on the project for ten years, and the scope of botanical subjects grew to encompass native grasses, ferns, and trees. Scripps ultimately decided not to publish the flora. Her estate donated most of his paintings in her collection, 1094 in total, to the San Diego Natural History Museum in 1933.

Albert Robert Valentien died on August 5, 1925, in San Diego, California.

== Collections ==
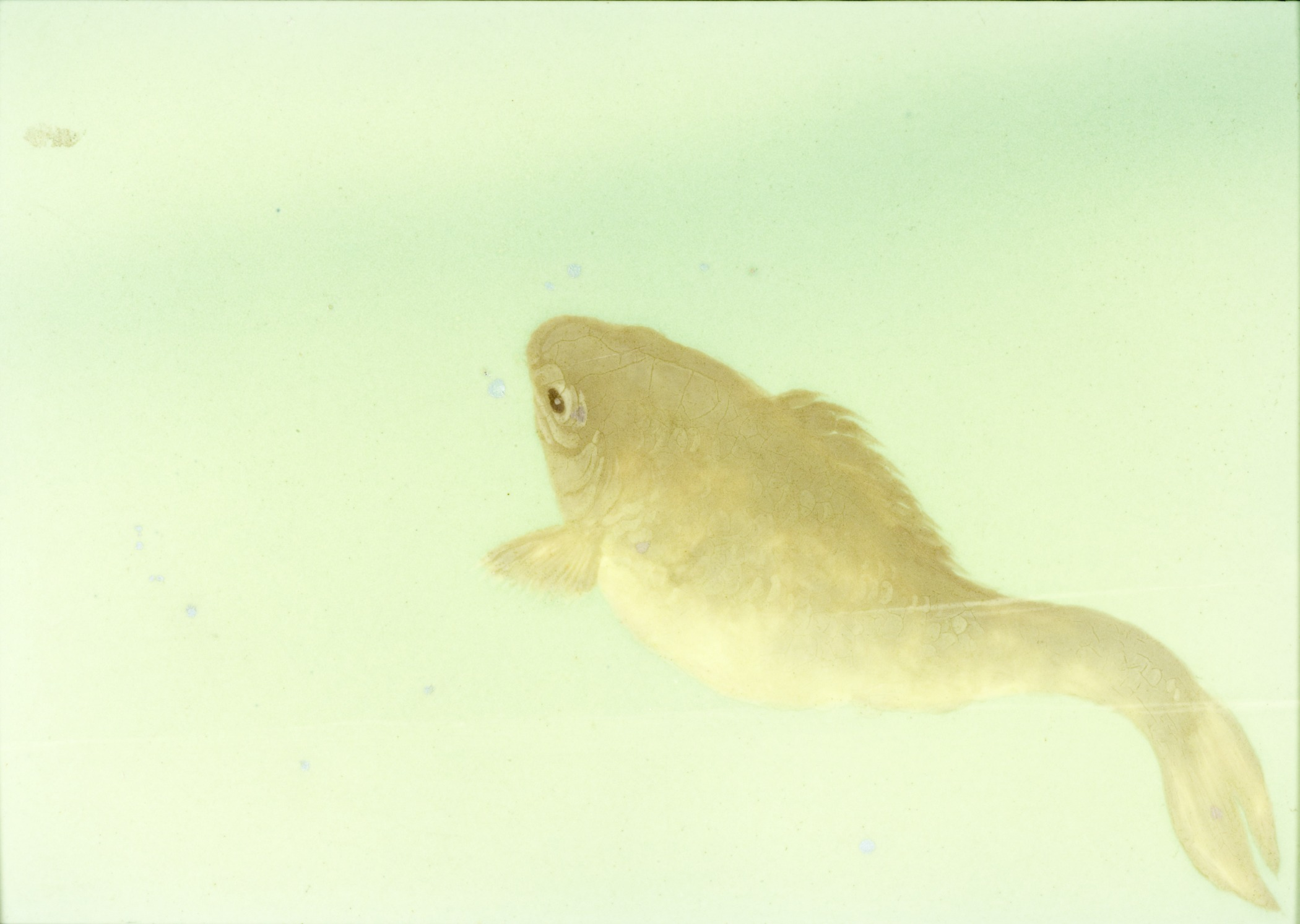
Earthenware plaque by Albert Robert Valentien for Rookwood Pottery Company, LACMA collection.

Valentien's paintings and art pottery work are represented in collections of the San Diego Natural History Museum, the Cincinnati Art Museum, the California State Library, the Los Angeles County Museum of Art (LACMA), and in private collections.

== See also ==
- List of California native plants
- Flora of California
