= Louise Abel (sculptor) =

German-American sculptor and ceramist

- Born: September 7, 1894; Widdern, Württemberg, German Empire
- Died: 1981 in Stuttgart
- Known for: Pottery, portrait sculpture, paintings

Louise Abel (September 7, 1894–1981) was a German-American sculptor and ceramist.

Abel was born in Widdern, Württemberg, German Empire, and in 1909 immigrated to the United States with her parents. She studied at the Kunstgewerbeschule in Stuttgart, as well as the Cincinnati Art Academy, the Art Students League in New York, The Louis Comfort Tiffany Foundation, the Barnes Foundation, the Pratt Institute, the Institute of Design at the Illinois Institute of Technology in Chicago, and the University of Cincinnati College of Liberal Arts.

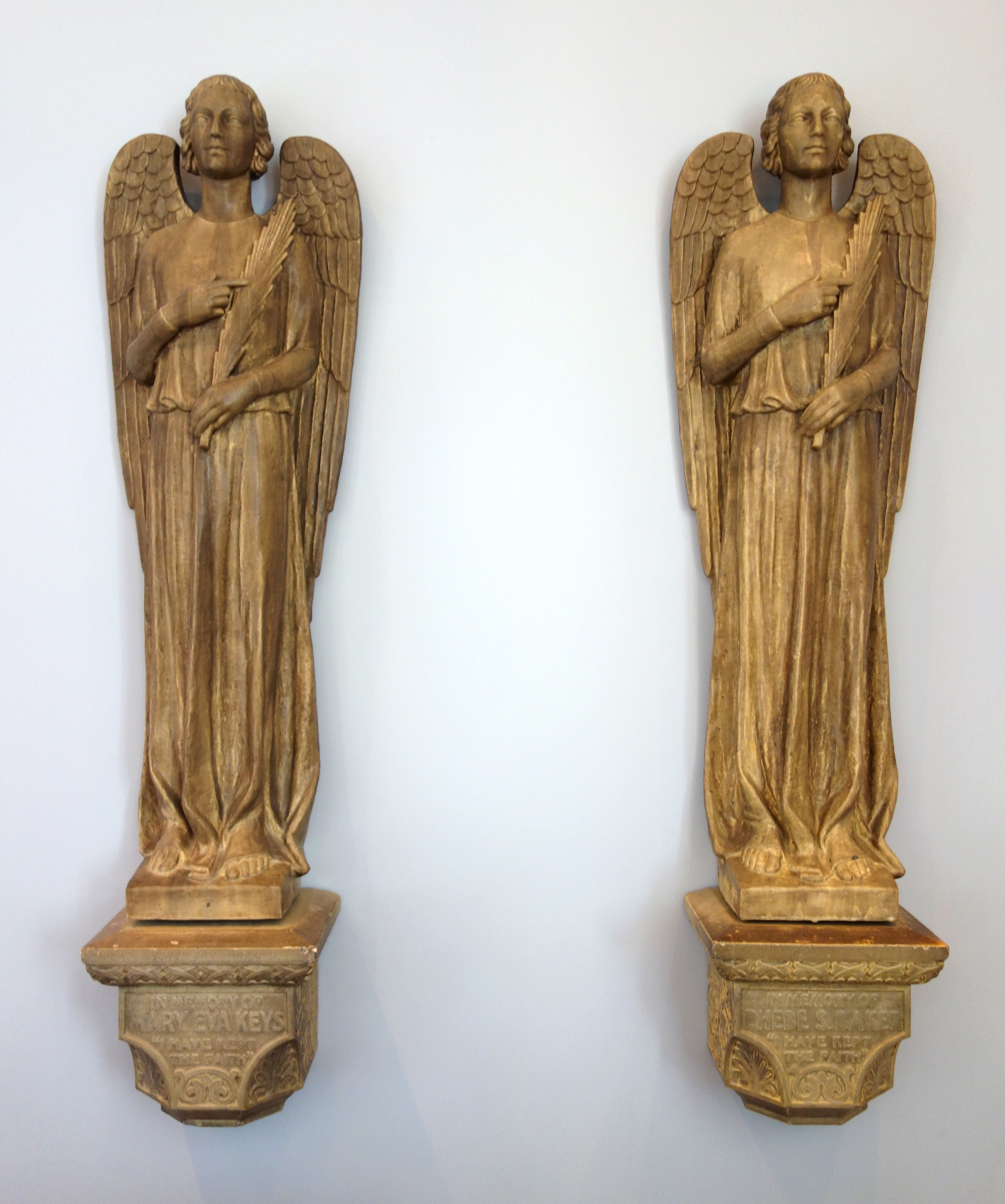
Angels, c. 1920. Architectural faience. Cincinnati Art Museum

From 1919 to 1932 she worked as a decorator and sculptor at the Rookwood Pottery Company, where she sculpted many of the company's animal and figural works. In 1959 she returned to Germany. She died 1982 in Stuttgart.
