= Rookwood Pottery Company =

American ceramics company based in Ohio

- Rookwood Pottery
- U.S. National Register of Historic Places
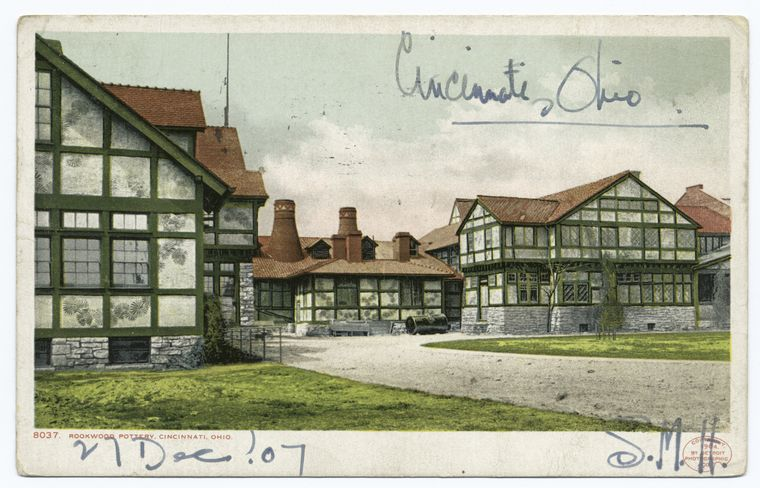
- pottery buildings in 1904

- Location within Ohio Location within the United States
- Location: Cincinnati, Ohio
- Coordinates: 39°6′26″N 84°30′3″W
- Built: 1892
- Architect: H. Neill Wilson (and later expanded)
- NRHP reference No.: 72001023
- Added to NRHP: December 05, 1972

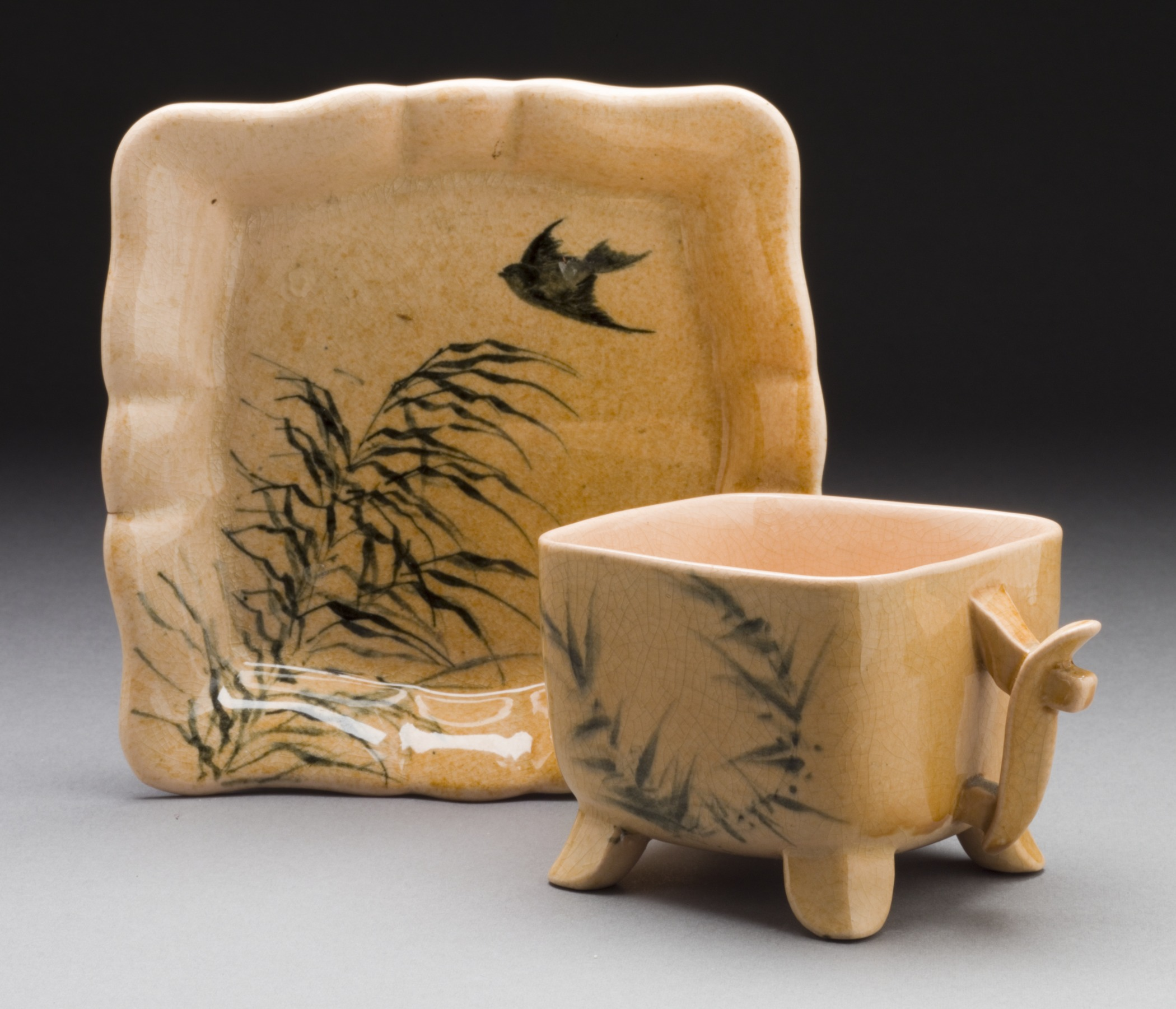
Japonisme in 1884

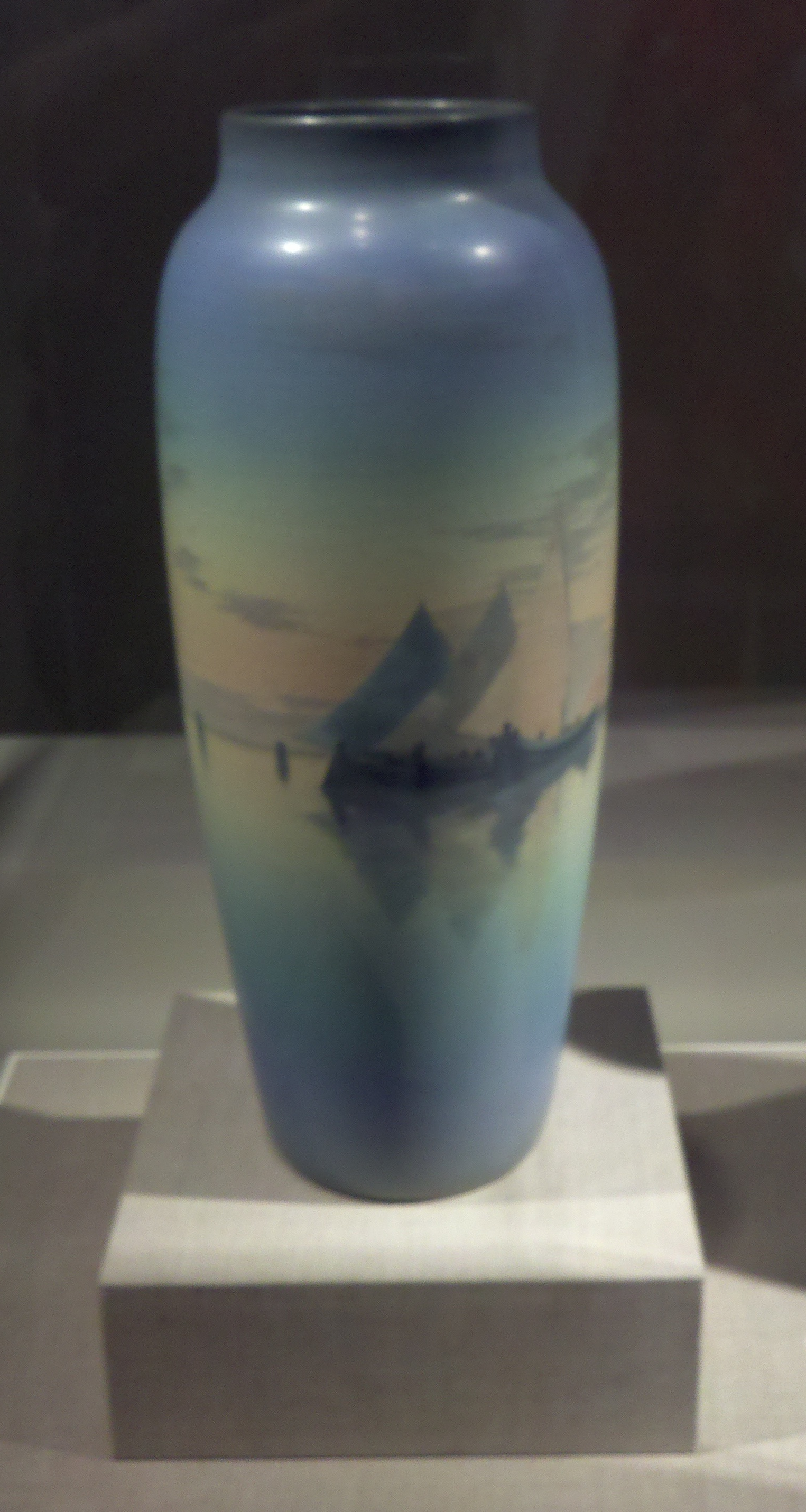
A Rookwood vase on display at the DeYoung Museum in San Francisco

Rookwood Pottery is an American ceramics company that was founded in 1880 and closed in 1967, before being revived in 2004. It was initially located in the Over-the-Rhine neighborhood in Cincinnati, Ohio, and has now returned there. In its heyday from about 1890 to the 1929 Crash, it was an important manufacturer, mostly of decorative American art pottery made in several fashionable styles and types of pieces.

== History ==
=== Beginnings ===
Maria Longworth Nichols Storer, daughter of wealthy Joseph Longworth, founded Rookwood Pottery in 1880 after being inspired by what she saw at the Centennial Exhibition in Philadelphia, including Japanese and French ceramics. The first Rookwood Pottery was located in a renovated school house on Eastern Avenue which had been purchased by Maria's father at a sheriff's sale in March 1880. Storer named it Rookwood, after her father's country estate near the city in Walnut Hills. The first ware came from the kiln on Thanksgiving Day of that year. Through years of experimentation with glazes and kiln temperatures, Rookwood pottery became a popular American art pottery, designed to be decorative as well as useful.

Rookwood was noted for its employment of women. Emily Faithfull mentioned in Three Visits to America that "perhaps there is no institution of the kind so successful as the famous Rockwood [sic] Pottery under the management of Mrs. Nichols" and stated "that the perfumes made by Young, Ladd & Coffin are put into dainty bottles, some of those I most admired being the 'Limoges jugs' made by the women-workers at the famous Cincinnati Rockwood [sic] Pottery, which is under the control of a very clever lady, the daughter of the wealthy wine-grower, Mr. Longworth. Some of the plaques, bowls, and vases produced at this pottery have deservedly received the recognition of leading Art connoisseurs."

Clara Chipman Newton was the archivist and general assistant, as well as a china decorator, for the first decade of the pottery; she shared with Storer the responsibility for overseeing the decoration and glazing. The artist Laura Anne Fry worked at Rookwood as a painter and teacher from 1881 to 1888.

The second Rookwood Pottery building, on top of Mount Adams, was built in 1891–1892 by H. Neill Wilson, who was son of prominent Cincinnati architect James Keys Wilson.

One of the early decorators was E. T. Hurley who joined Rookwood in 1896 and worked there for over 50 years. He was a student of Frank Duveneck at the Cincinnati Art Academy. Hurley specialized in painting landscapes and nature scenes winning a gold medal at the 1904 St. Louis World's Fair for his work in ceramics.

=== Wares ===
The earliest work from the pottery is relief-worked on colored clay, in red, pinks, greys and sage greens. Some were gilt, or had stamped patterns, and some were carved. Often these were painted or otherwise decorated by the purchaser of the "greenware" (unfinished piece), a precursor to today's do-it-yourself movement. However, such personally decorated pieces are not usually considered Rookwood for purposes of sale or valuation.

After this period, Storer sought a "standard" look for Rookwood and developed the "Standard Glaze", a yellow-tinted, high-gloss clear glaze often used over leaf or flower motifs. A series of portraits — often of generic American Indian characters or historical figures — were produced using the Standard Glaze. A variant on the Standard Glaze was the less-common but very collectible "tiger eye" which appears only on a red clay base. Tiger Eye produces a golden shimmer deep within the glaze; however, the results of this glaze were unpredictable.

Rookwood also produced pottery in the Japonism trend, after Storer invited Japanese artist Kitaro Shirayamadani to come to Cincinnati in 1887 to work for the company. Davis Collamore & Co., a high-end New York City importer of porcelain and glass, were Rookwood's representatives at the Exposition Universelle, Paris 1889.

In 1894, Rookwood introduced three glazes: "Iris" a clear, colorless glaze, "Sea Green" which was clear but green-tinted, and "Aerial Blue" which was clear but blue-tinted. The latter glaze was produced for just one year, while the two former glazes were used for more than a decade.

With increased interest in the American Arts & Crafts Movement, a matte glaze was needed which could be used over under-glaze decoration (largely floral and scenic). Rookwood introduced a "Vellum" glaze in 1904, which presented a matte surface through which the slightly frosted-appearing decoration beneath could be seen. Rookwood artist Sara Sax, experimented in working with translucent vellum glaze and relief carving.

One of the last glaze lines of Rookwood was "Ombroso", not used until after 1910. Ombroso, used on cut or incised pottery, is a brown or black matte glaze.

In 1902, Rookwood began producing architectural pottery. Under the direction of William Watts Taylor, this division rapidly gained national and international acclaim. Many flat pieces were used around fireplaces in homes in Cincinnati and surrounding areas, while custom installations found their places in grand homes, hotels, and public spaces. Original Rookwood-installed tiles can be viewed in Carew Tower, Union Terminal and Dixie Terminal in Cincinnati, as well as the Rathskeller Room at the Seelbach Hilton in Louisville, Kentucky and the West Baden Springs Hotel in southern Indiana. In New York City, the Vanderbilt Hotel, Grand Central Station, Lord & Taylor, and several subway stops feature Rookwood tiles. "One of the most important Rookwood tile installations in the country" is on display at the Carnegie West Branch of Cleveland Public Library and depicts Durham Cathedral in England.

The 1920s were highly prosperous years for Rookwood. The pottery employed about 200 workers, including sculptor Louise Abel and future sculptor Erwin Frey, and received almost 5,000 visitors to the Mount Adams business each year.

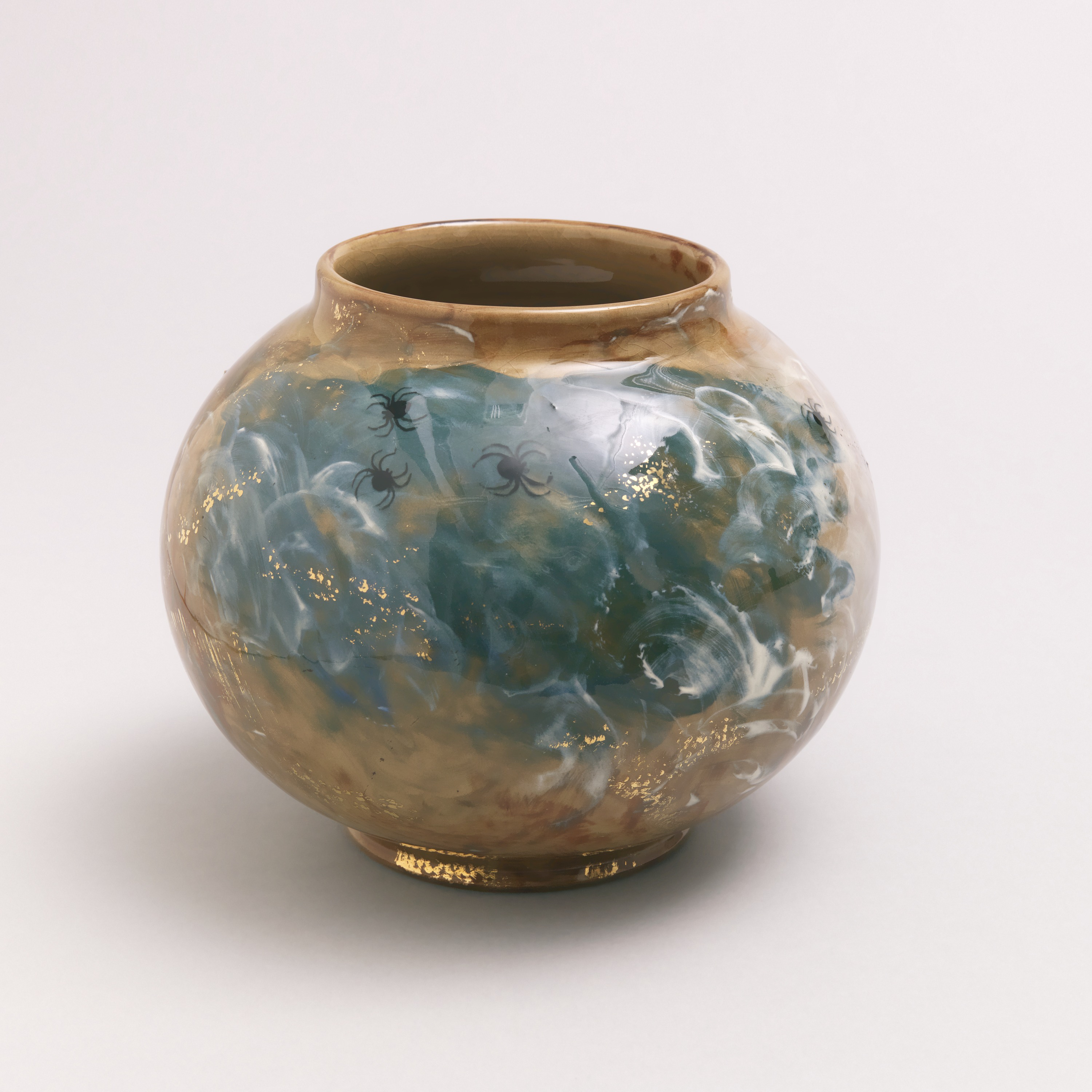
Vase with bat and spiders, 1882

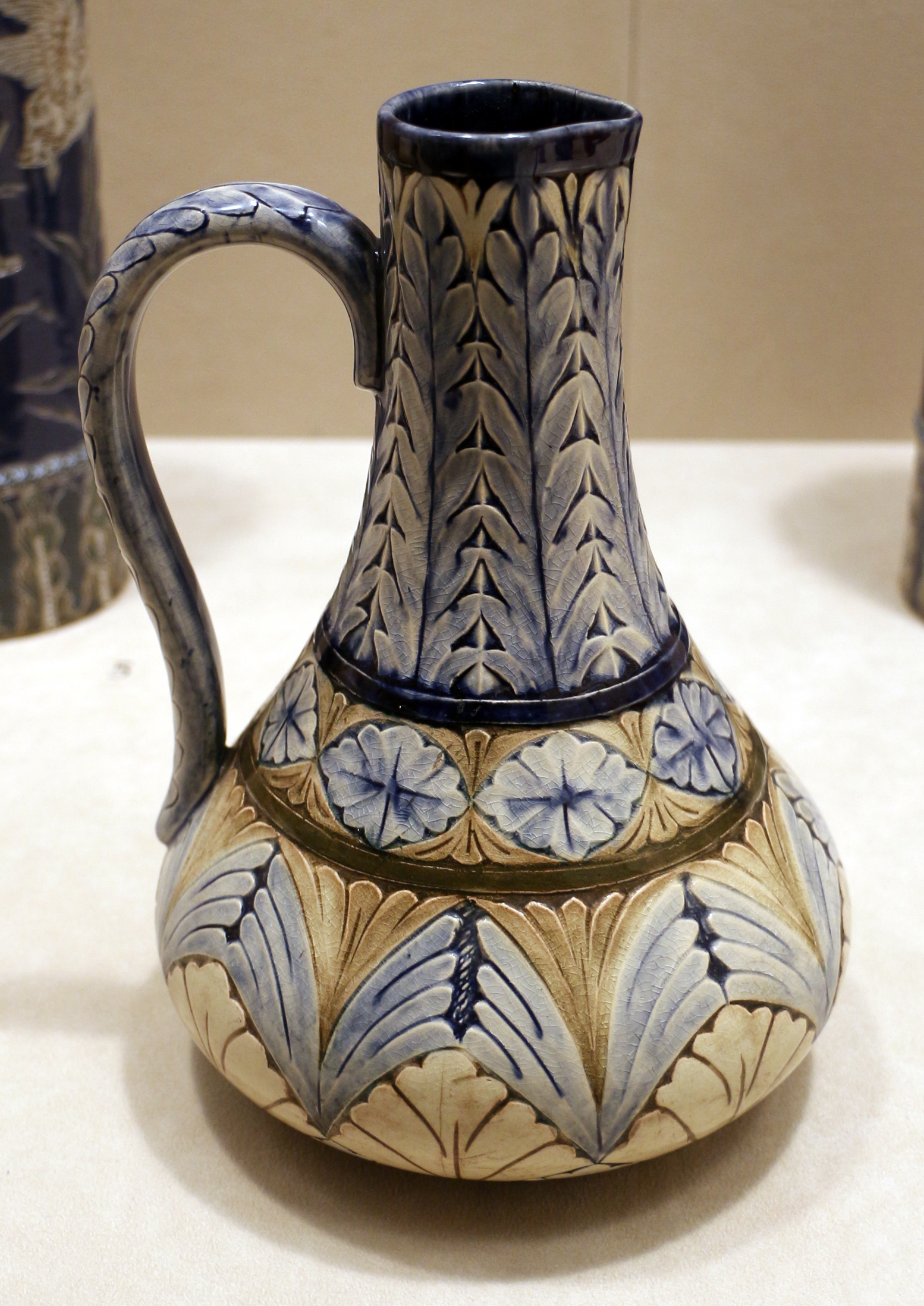
Jug by Abby Hyde Allen for Rookwood, 1883

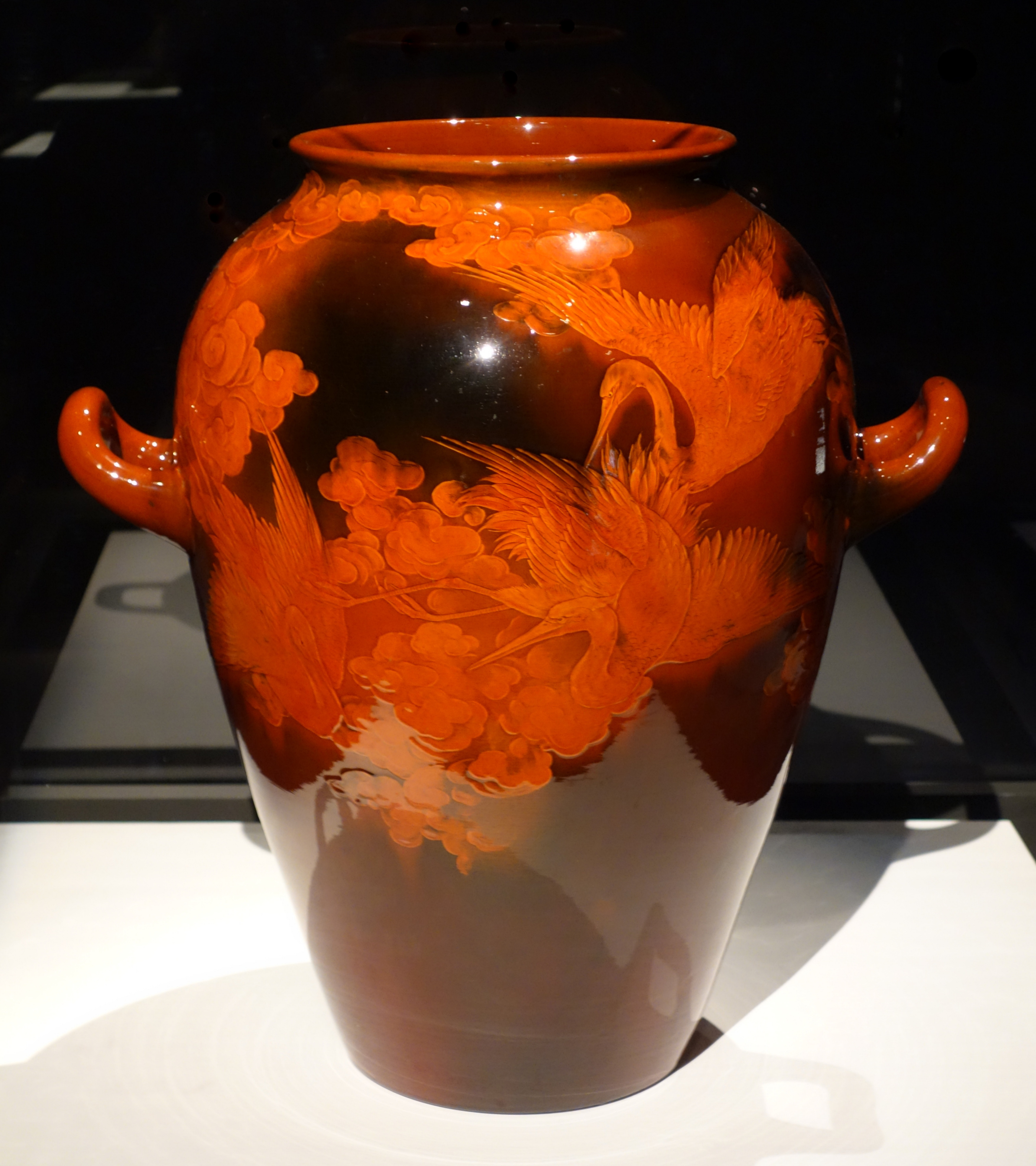
Vase by Albert Robert Valentien, 1893, earthenware with mahogany glaze line

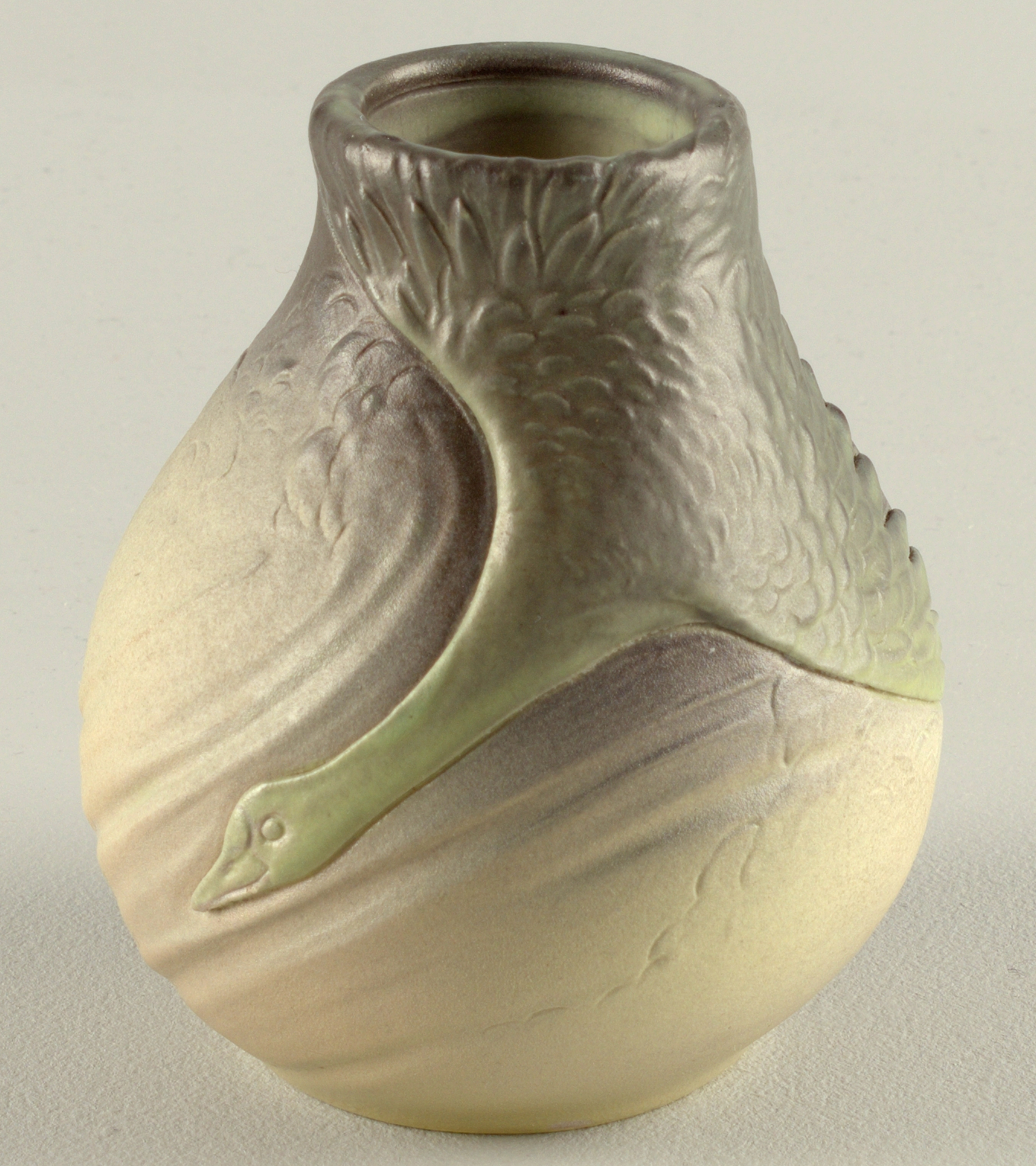
Vase by Kataro Shirayamadani, 1901

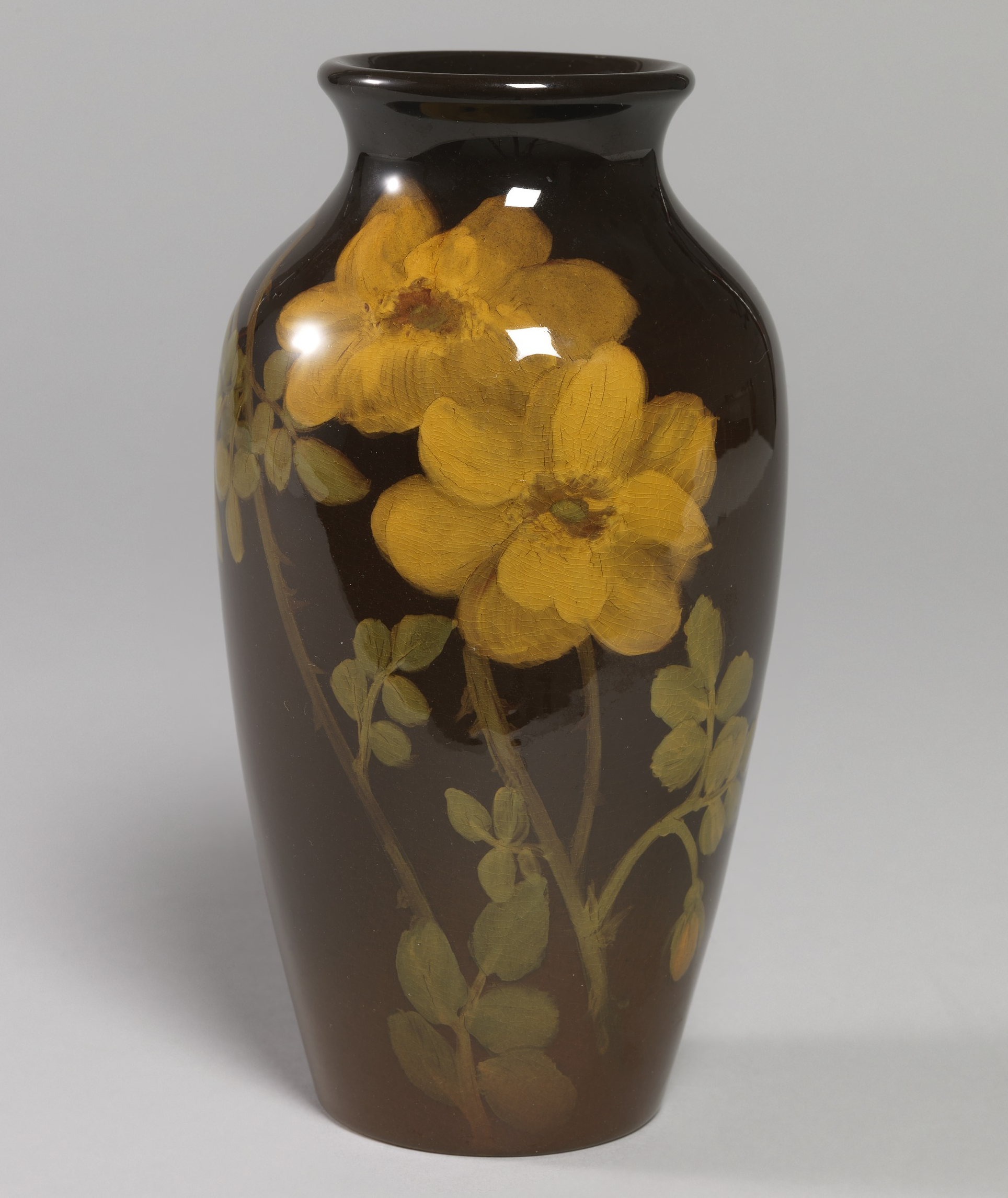
Vase, 1902

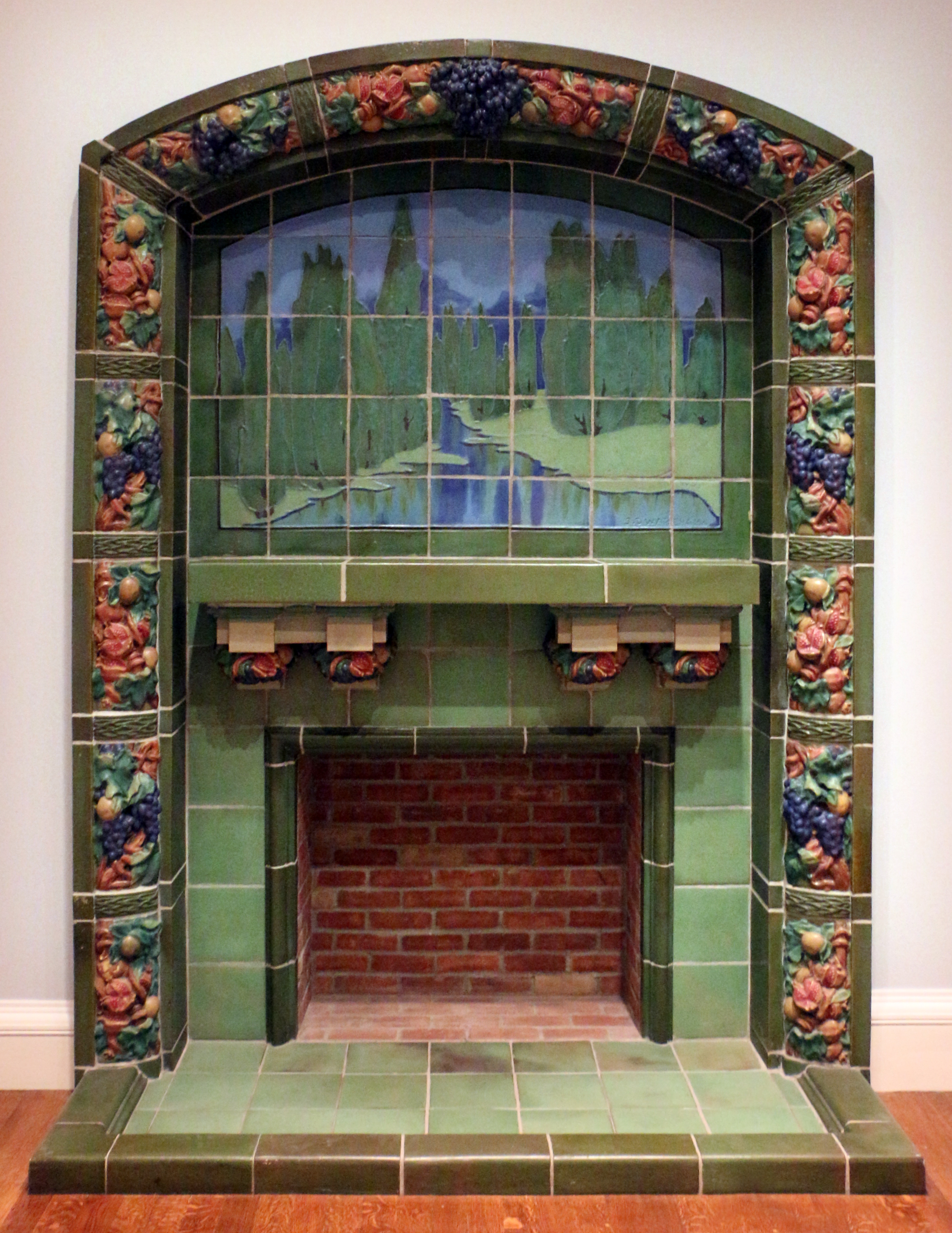
Fireplace by John D. Wareham, 1903

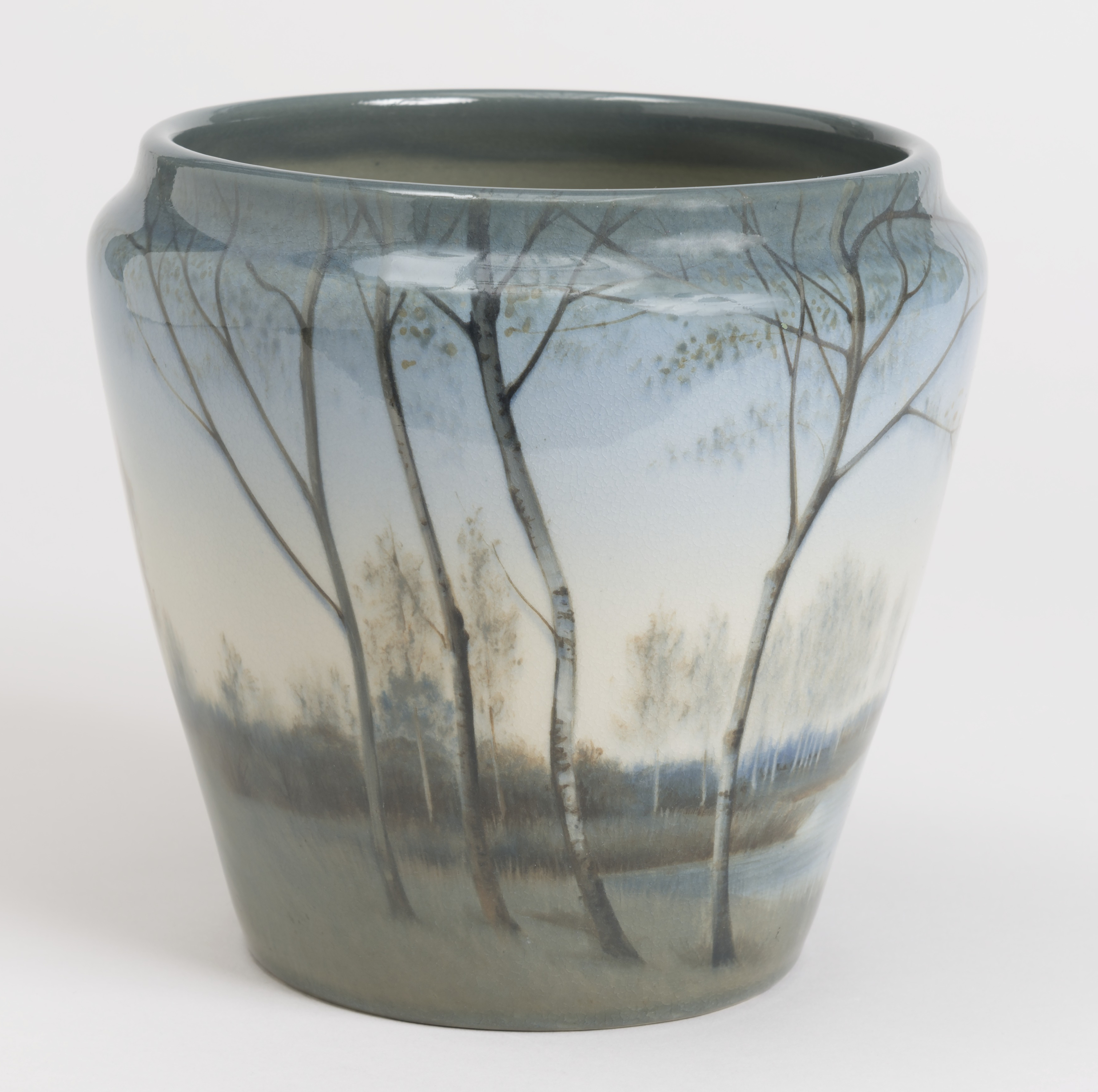
Vase, shape #2000, 1912

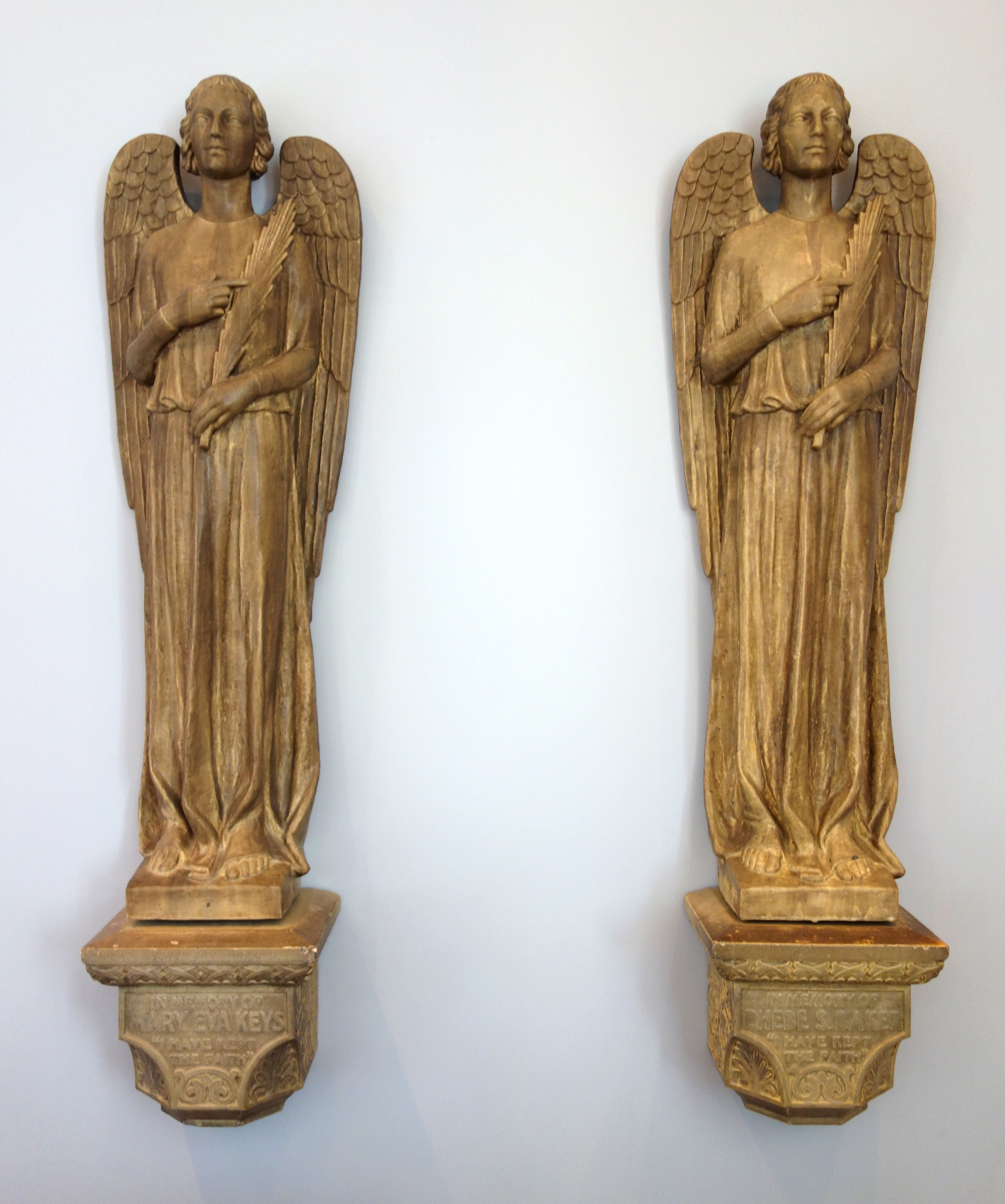
Angels by Louise Abel, c. 1920, architectural faience

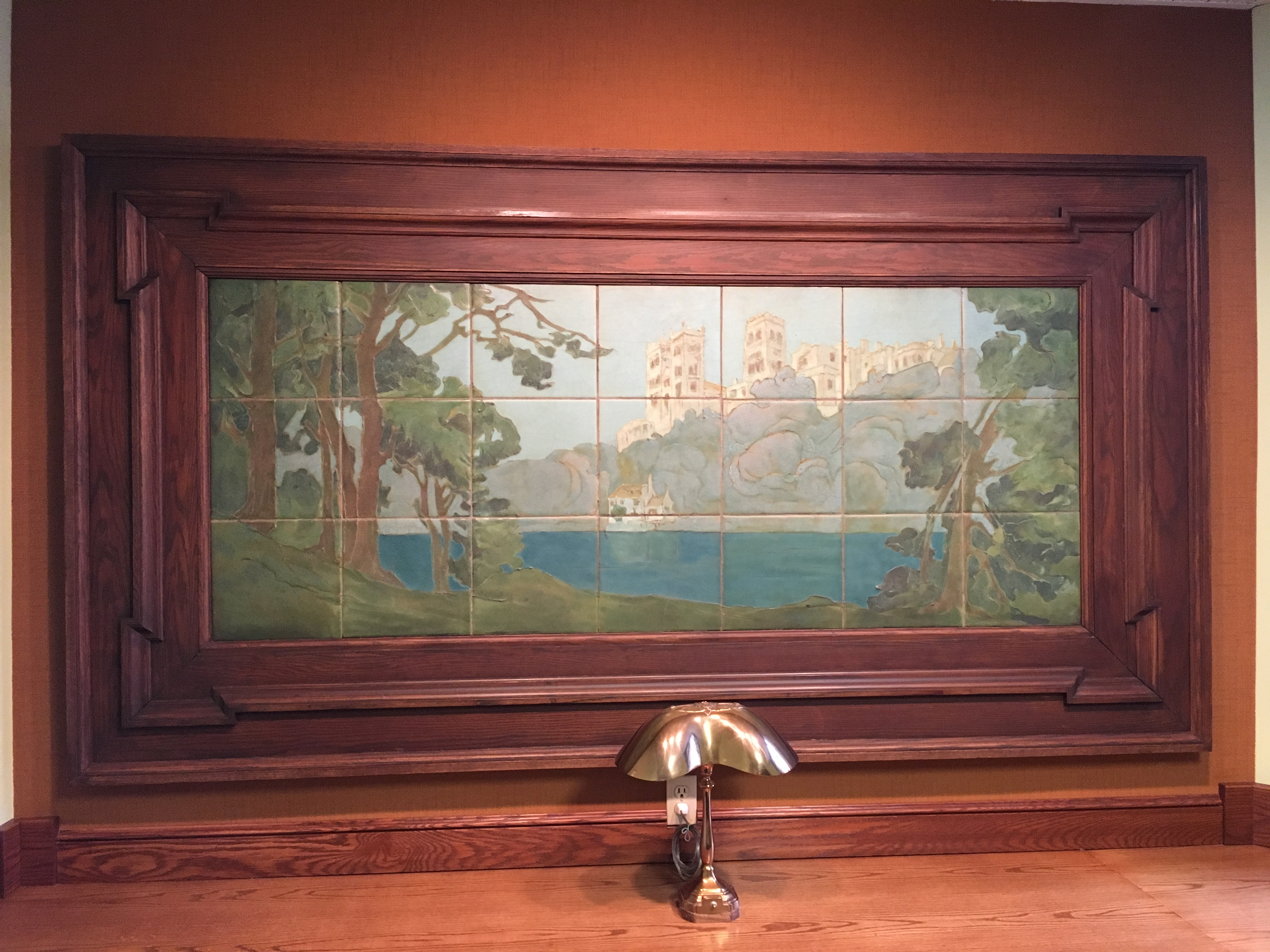
Panel of Rookwood tiles of Durham Cathedral

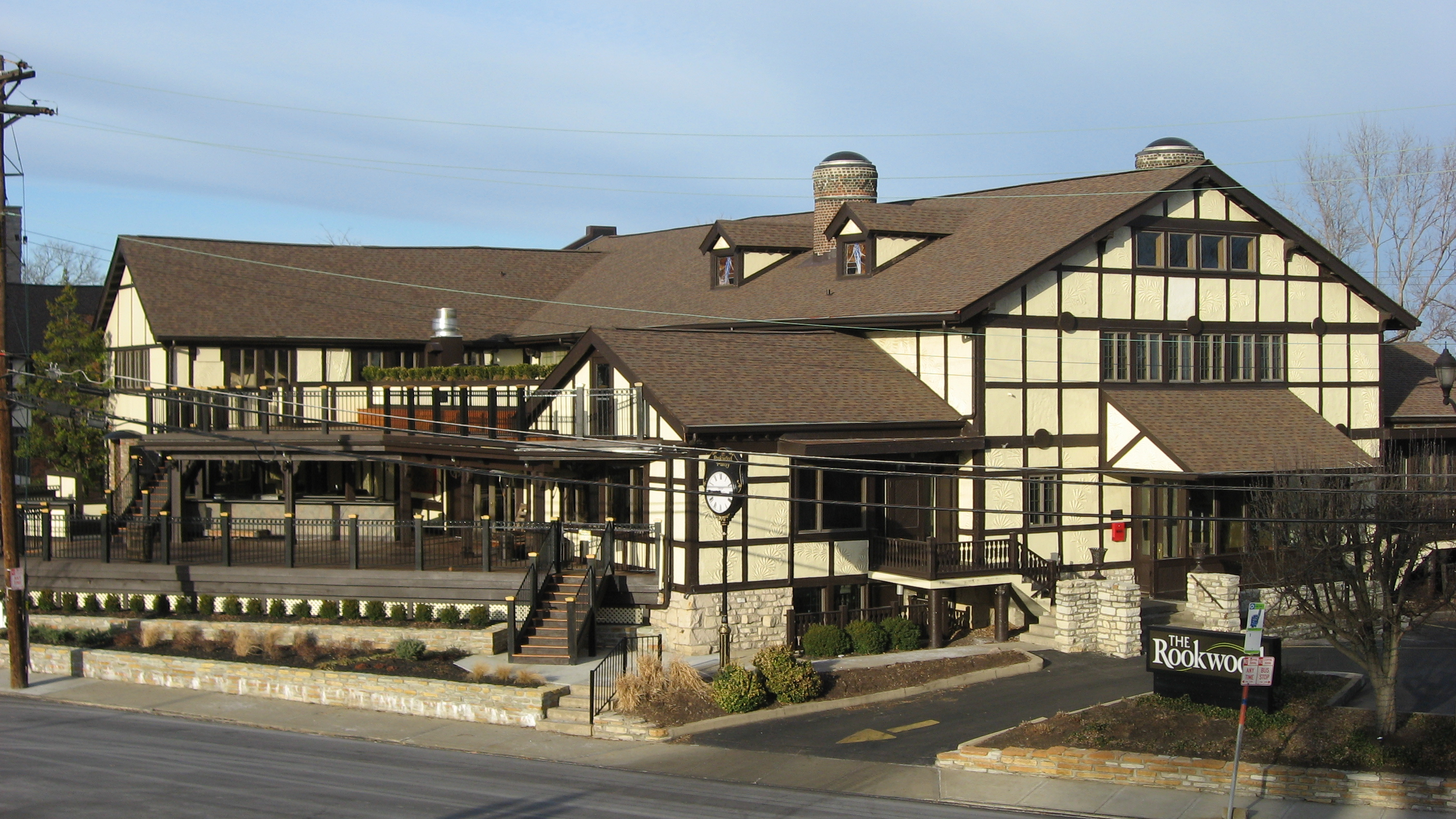
The original buildings in 2011, seen from Holy Cross Monastery

=== Decline ===
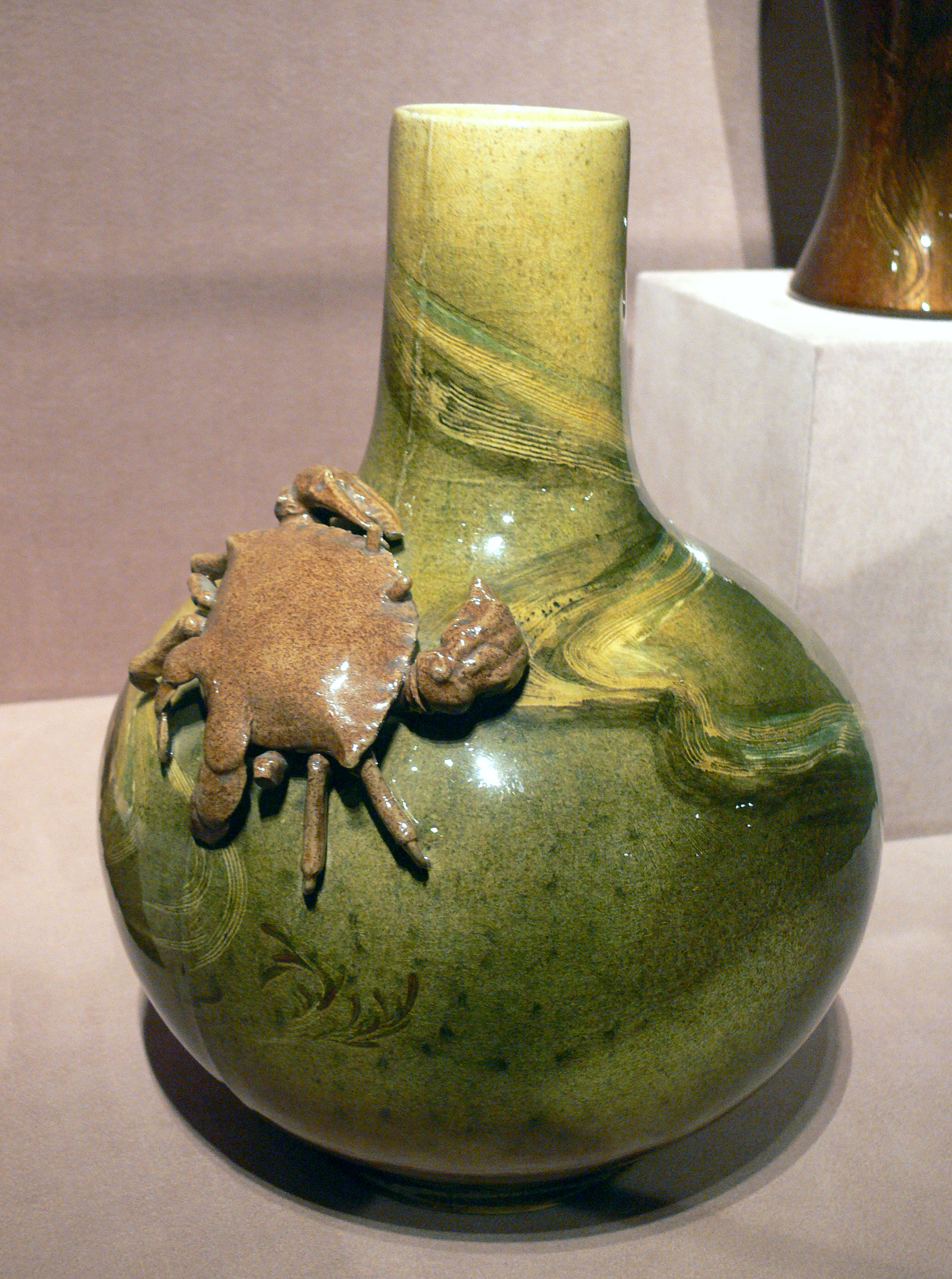
Rookwood Vase

The company was hit hard by the Great Depression. Art pottery became a low priority, and architects could no longer afford Rookwood tiles and mantels. By 1934, Rookwood showed its first loss, and by 1936 the company was operating an average of just one week a month. Several employees, most notably Harold Bopp, William Hentschel and David Seyler left the company and started Kenton Hills Porcelains in Erlanger, Kentucky. On April 17, 1941, Rookwood filed for bankruptcy. Through these tough times, ownership of the company changed hands, but the Rookwood artists remained.

In 1959, Rookwood was purchased by the Herschede Clock Company, and production moved to Starkville, Mississippi. Unable to recover from the losses experienced during the Great Depression, production ceased in 1967.

== Revival ==
By 1982, Rookwood was in negotiations to be sold to overseas manufacturers. Michigan dentist and art pottery collector Arthur Townley used his life savings to purchase all of the remaining Rookwood assets. During his tenure as Rookwood's owner, Townley produced small quantities of pieces to maintain the original trademarks. Townley refused offers to sell Rookwood for over two decades, but eventually collaborated with Cincinnati investors Christopher & Patrick Rose in 2004 to move the company back to Cincinnati. In July 2006, after approximately one year of negotiations, the Rookwood Pottery Company entered into a contract to acquire all of the remaining assets of the original Rookwood Pottery from Townley. These assets included, among other things, the trademarks, more than 2,000 original molds, and hundreds of glaze recipes used by the original Rookwood Pottery Company.

In 2011, Martin Wade and Marilyn Scripps gained sole ownership of the company. It operates from a production studio in the historic Over-the-Rhine neighborhood of Cincinnati. The company is in full production, having invested in new kilns and equipment and hired new staff. Rookwood Pottery also works with many major institutions to create awards and commemorative pieces. Rookwood Pottery artist Roy Robinson, for example, designed the Center Court Rookwood Cup for the ATP World Tour.

In 2012, the historic Monroe Building of Chicago completed a restoration of its original architectural elements to include the reconditioning and replacement of thousands of original Rookwood Pottery tiles. In 2013, a fireplace created by Rookwood Pottery, in collaboration with artists at the University of Cincinnati, was installed at the Contemporary Arts Center in Cincinnati. Describing the collaboration, co-owner Marilyn Scripps said: "Our goal in working with these three talented artists is to reposition Rookwood Pottery to what it was originally – a forward-thinking company with its eye on the future, willing to take risks, and in the vanguard of the industry, by affiliating ourselves with like-minded artists." That same year, Rookwood Pottery was featured on the Martha Stewart Living Blog and on the Science Channel program How It's Made.

In 2015, the company collaborated with Cincinnati-based artist Kevin Auzenne to create commemorative baseball-themed tiles. In 2017, Rookwood Pottery Company and the Cincinnati Zoo teamed up to create a Fiona ornament, dedicated to a premature hippo.

A dedicated gallery of Rookwood Pottery is in the Cincinnati Wing of the Cincinnati Art Museum, and masterpiece Rookwood pieces are exhibited at the Museum of the American Arts and Crafts Movement in St. Petersburg.
