= Frederick Rhead =

Frederick Rhead may refer to:

- Frederick Alfred Rhead (1856–1933), potter working in North Staffordshire, England
- Frederick Hurten Rhead (1880–1942), his son, ceramicist and figure in the Arts and Crafts movement
