= Shelley Potteries =

British pottery company

Shelley China Ltd.
- Trade name: The Foley Potteries
- Formerly: Knight & Wileman; Wileman & Co. (1872-1925) Shelley (1925-1965
- Founders: Elkin; Knight; Bridgwood
- Defunct: 1966
- Fate: Acquired by Allied English Potteries and shut down
- Headquarters: Staffordshire, United Kingdom

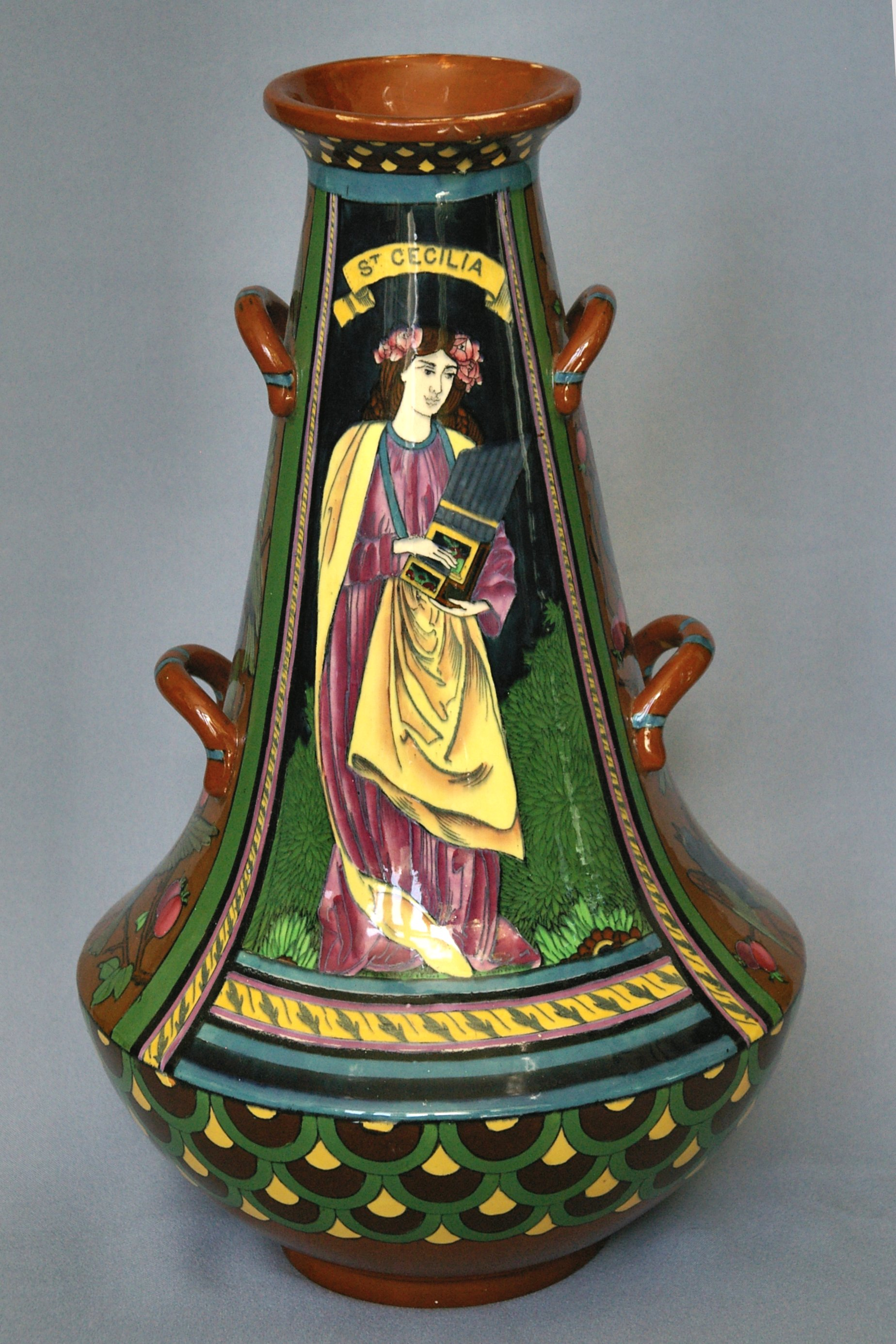
Intarsio St Cecilia vase – Frederick Rhead 1899

Shelley Potteries, situated in Staffordshire, was earlier known as Wileman & Co. which had also traded as The Foley Potteries. The first Shelley to join the company was Joseph Ball Shelley in 1862 and in 1896 his son Percy Shelley became the sole proprietor, after which it remained a Shelley family business until 1966 when it was taken over by Allied English Potteries. Its china and earthenware products were many and varied although the major output was table ware. In the late Victorian period the Art Nouveau style pottery and Intarsio ranges designed by art director Frederick Alfred Rhead were extremely popular but Shelley is probably best known for its fine bone china “Art Deco” ware of the inter-war years and post-war fashionable tea ware.

Wileman refers to a backstamped version which predates Shelley-branded porcelain. The factory that manufactured this brand of porcelain was located in Longton, Staffordshire, England.

== Early history ==
The origins of Shelley pottery were in the district known as Foley in the potteries. By the beginning of the nineteenth century, although the district was relatively poor, the manufacture of earthenware was being developed and a number of pottery companies had been established. One of these was the factory of Messrs. Elkin, Knight & Bridgwood which by 1829 had a powerful steam engine and flint Mill.

Knight became sole proprietor of the business in 1853 but shortly afterwards took Henry Wileman as a partner, trading as Knight & Wileman. Three years later Knight retired and Henry Wileman continued the business in his own name. In 1862 Henry Wileman employed Joseph Shelley (whose family had at one time produced pottery on the site now occupied by the Gladstone Museum) as a travelling salesman. In 1864 Henry Wileman died and his two sons James F and Charles J took over the business. Two years later the business was split, James managed the earthenware factory whilst Charles managed the china factory. Charles Wileman retired in 1870 from the earthenware factory and James became sole proprietor of this factory. Joseph Shelley was taken into partnership with James Wileman in 1872, but only for the china factory. The company became known as Wileman & Co and used the backstamp "Foley".

== Developments to 1910 ==
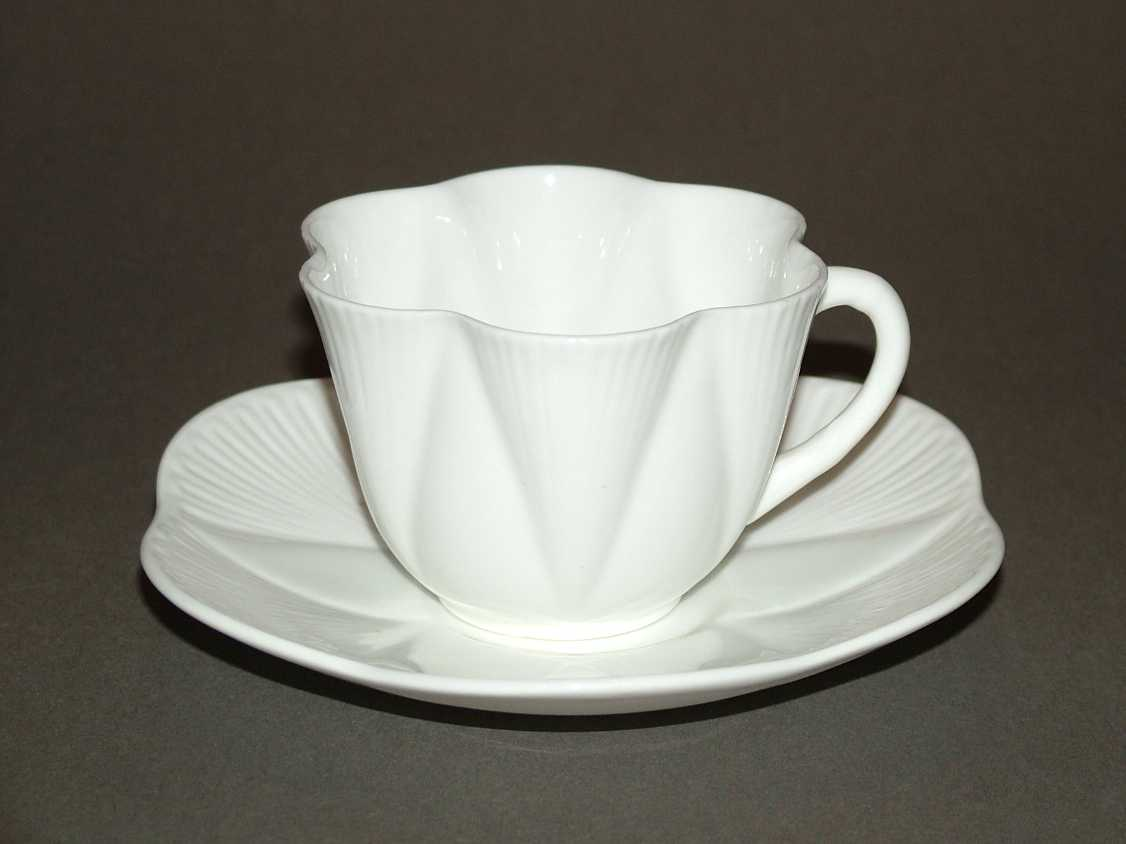
Cup and saucer Dainty White design by Rowland Morris 1896

In 1881 Joseph's son Percy Shelley joined the company. In 1884 James Wileman retired from the china factory to manage the earthenware factory before retiring altogether in 1892 when the earthenware factory closed. Wileman & Co were starting to produce ware to the public's taste and in 1896 had appointed agents in Australia, USA & Canada and had a showroom in London, describing themselves as "Manufacturers of Art Porcelain".

Joseph Shelley died in June 1896, leaving Percy in sole control of the company. Percy wanted to enhance the company and in 1896 he employed Rowland Morris. Morris was a ceramic designer and went on to design the Dainty cup shape. This shape became very popular, especially in the US after the 2nd World War and it continued in production until the takeover in 1966.

Frederick Alfred Rhead was employed in 1896, as the Arts Director. Rhead brought his own kind of skills to the company and introduced several ranges of china and earthenware and with this, enhanced the company's reputation further. In 1899 the journal 'Artist' produced an article entitled "Some Beautiful English Pottery" this was completely devoted to what was then being termed Foley Art Pottery, one of the main fashion setters of that time, Liberty's of Regent Street, London was exhibiting a selection of the wares. A decorative range of earthenware called "Intarsio" was one of Rhead's major contributions to the pottery. He left the company in 1905.

Walter Slater then took over as Arts Director. The Slater name was another well known family name in the pottery industry. Walter was an apprentice at Mintons in the late 1870s before moving to Doulton's, at Nile Street, Burslem under the direction of his uncle John Slater. Slater had joined Wileman & Co at a time when there was an economic depression, so in his first years he found himself supervising the more popular ware which Wileman had become well known for.

== Shelley 1910–1945 ==
In 1910 Percy Shelley decided to try to register the "Foley" name as its trade name as the china was still marked Foley China. Another company that also used the "Foley" name on its backstamp objected and this resulted in a court case where it was judged that Wileman's could not have the exclusive claim to use the name. Shelley changed the name to "Shelley", which was placed within a shield. From 1910 to 1916 the words "Late Foley" were put over the top of the shield. Shelley's placed advertisements advising the public of the changeover – one statement read:

The world-wide reputation of "Foley" China has caused many cheap imitations and in future, to protect the public, the real and genuine "Foley" China will always be indelibly marked "Shelley" China, a trademark which is a guarantee of the highest excellence.

In 1911 the economic situation had started to improve and Walter Slater was given more artistic freedom. He started to develop ornamental pottery and earthenware, as well as supervising the development of fine bone china. By 1914 Shelley had started to make a name for itself by producing dinnerware in china as opposed to high quality earthenware. Within a few years it proved to be a great success, especially in the USA.

Shortly before the 1st World War two of Percy's sons, Percy Norman and Vincent Bob, joined the family company. Kenneth Jack, the other son, went to Birmingham University. All three were known by their middle name and later on all three had a cup shape named after them i.e. Norman, Vincent and Kenneth. Norman and Bob joined up and both returned safely from the war. Jack stayed on at university. All three then started working for the company, Norman was concerned with production, Bob took over warehouses and stock control, Jack with his accountancy training took charge of the finances. In 1919 Eric Slater, Walter's son joined the company. After completing his training he started to produce designs which in later years proved a huge success for the company. During 1920 money was invested in developing the works and an extension that included an office block and showroom was completed (this was the three-storey building in front of the factory) The investment and improvements that were started in 1920 were now in evidence as quality and overall production at the factory continued to improve. In 1925 the showroom was described as one of the best in the Potteries.

The company was still called Wileman & Co, even though it had been controlled by the Shelley family for over fifty years and on 1 January 1925 the Shelley name and trademark was registered.

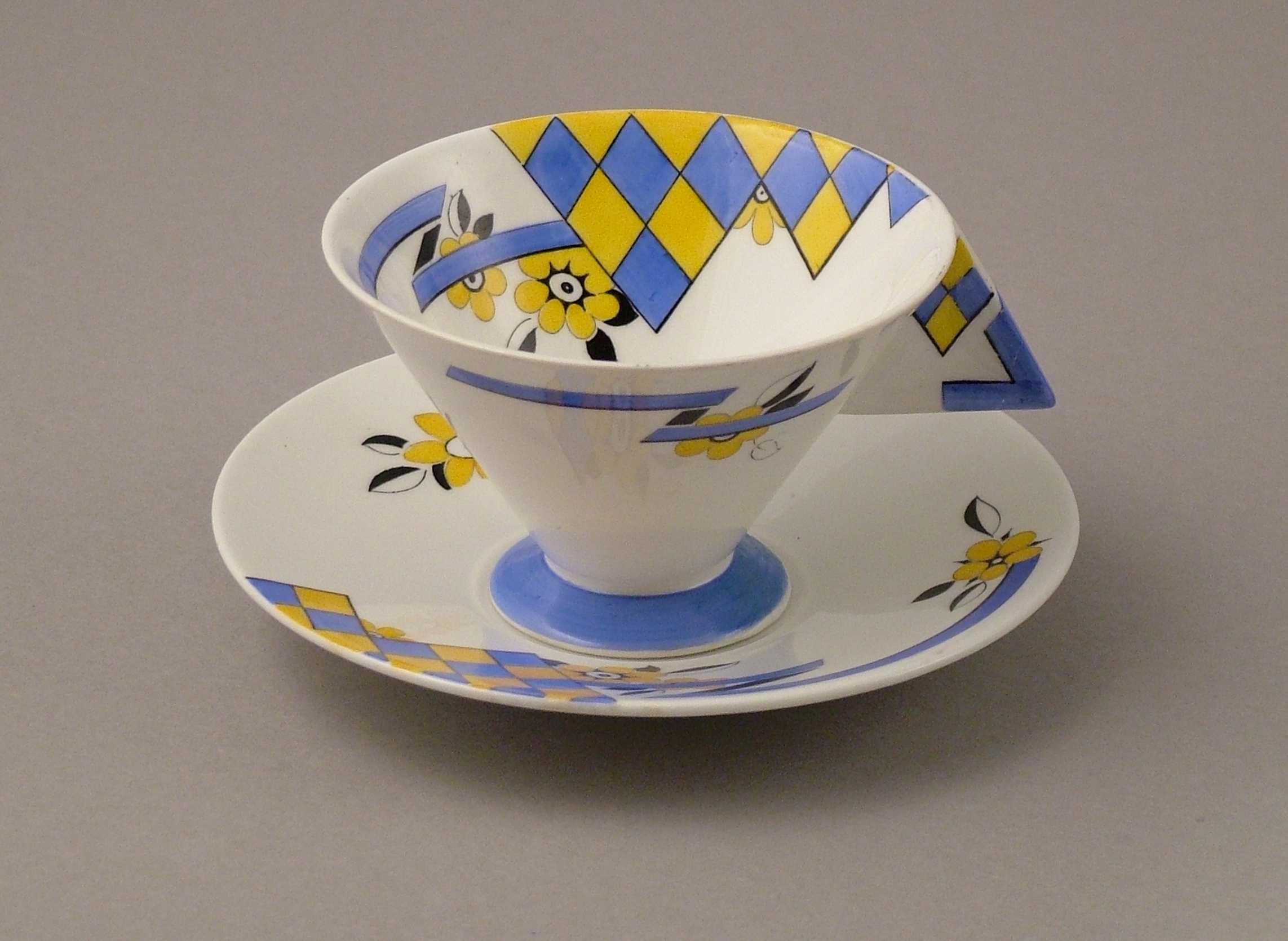
Art Deco Vogue shape designed by Eric Slater 1930

The period of the mid twenties until the start of the Second World War was Shelley's most productive years. It was during this time that the Art Deco period was proving to be very successful with the various Deco shapes that were designed. Another factor that was helping the company was that the bone content in the china had enhanced the quality and in cup shapes the phrase 'eggshell china' was commonly used. Shelley was promoting its ware through advertising and employed a company called Smedleys Advertising Services Ltd. Smedleys were futuristic in the way they promoted the ware in catalogues, magazines, newspapers and even at cinemas. This again helped in keeping the Shelley name in everyone's mind.

In the mid twenties Shelley broke with tradition and employed a well known illustrator of the time, Hilda Cowham, to produce a range of nursery ware. Cowham designed a series called Playtime; The design was a simple representation of children's activities. A second series of designs were produced in 1927 and in 1928 a tea set with a seaside theme was produced. The teapot was a bathing tent, the sugar bowl was a sea side bucket and the milk jug was a shell with a seaweed handle.

In 1926 Shelley introduced a second well known illustrator – Mabel Lucie Attwell. Her first six designs portrayed scenes involving children, animals and small green elves in green suits – these were called 'Boo Boos'. Attwell also produced a tea set, the teapot was in the shape of a mushroom house, the sugar bowl was a mushroom with the top cut off and the milk jug was a green Boo Boo in a coy saluting pose.

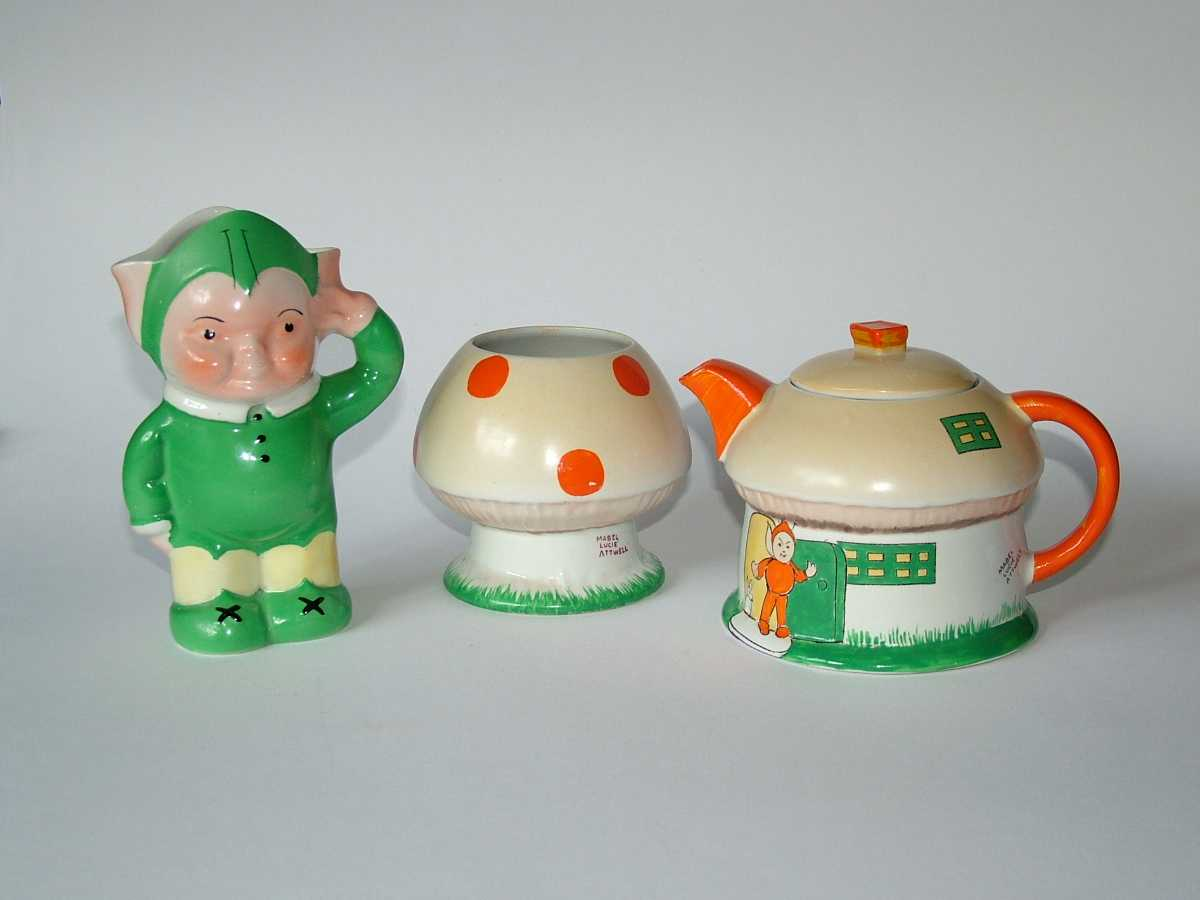
Mabel Lucie Attwell designed Boo Boo tea set, late 1920s

The response to these designs was enthusiastic and the Pottery Gazette wrote that they were "a truly irresistible range of nursery ware, altogether in advance of what was usually put before the trade". The buying public must have also liked them as they sold very well. Attwell's success continued and later a set of children figures were introduced, all were named. A series of small elves in various poses was also produced. Attwell continued to produce designs and the ware was still being manufactured in the sixties.

Whilst Shelley was now renowned for its fine china, the factory also produced normal run-of-the-mill table ware, although items such as jelly moulds broke with tradition as the shape was seen on the outside of the mould and not just on the inside, the outside of the mould usually being plain. Another design that proved very popular during this period was the Harmony and Harmony drip ware; this decoration was produced on almost everything that Shelley manufactured.

In 1928 an inventory and valuation of the land, buildings and contents was commissioned and this valued the whole lot at £50,000.

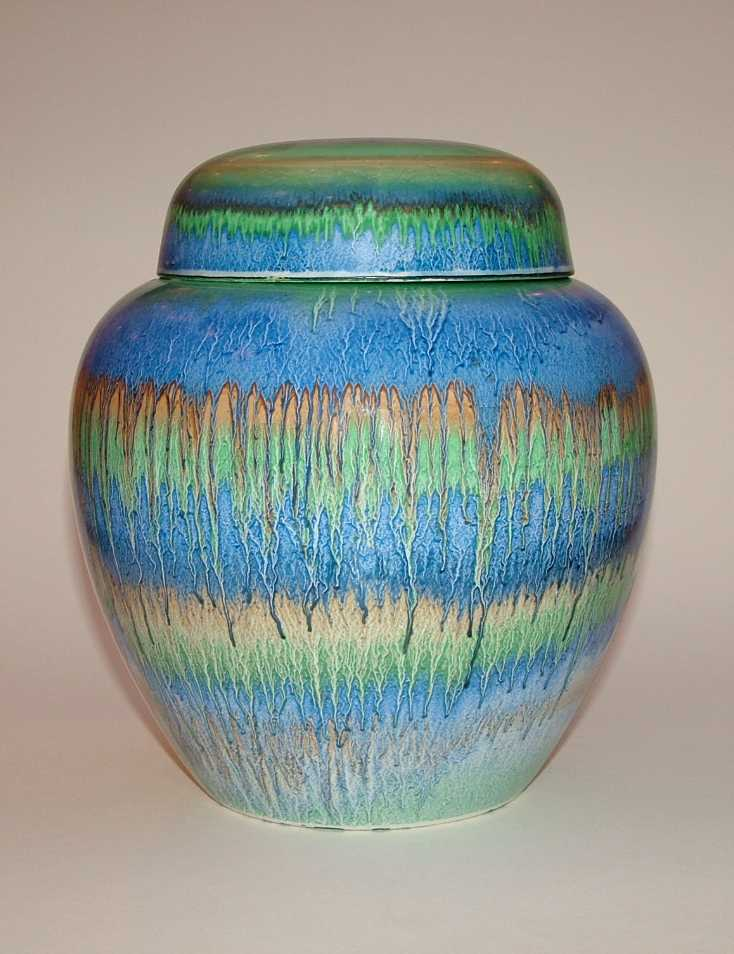
Harmony Art Ware ginger jar – Eric Slater 1932

In January 1929 the company became a limited company with Percy Shelley and his three sons being equal shareholders. In 1932 Percy Shelley retired after being the proprietor for almost fifty years, he moved to Bournemouth and died in 1937. In 1933 Kenneth Jack died in hospital after an operation. Walter Slater retired as Arts Director in 1937, his son Eric took over as Arts Director.

The success of the company continued into the late thirties, but when war was declared in September 1939, Shelley was suddenly faced with the realisation that there would be shortages of labour due to conscription and that materials would quickly be in short supply. Regulation and restrictions were brought in and controlled by the Board of Trade. In June 1942 a complete ban on decorated ware was imposed on the UK market. Decorated ware was still being produced for export, as exports were a vital source of income for the UK

During the war a decision was taken to stop the production of earthenware and concentrate entirely on producing fine bone china. This meant a complete change-around at the factory; this was to give the production a continuous flow from the slip house to the packaging house.

== Shelley post 1945 ==
The war ended in 1945, although it was several years before the restrictions were fully lifted. In September 1945 the pottery industry was one of the first areas of manufacture to secure the release of key workers from the armed forces.

In December 1945 Vincent Bob suddenly died. In January 1946 Eric Slater and Ralph Tatton were elected onto the board of directors to serve with Percy Norman Shelley who became the managing director. Vincent Bob's eldest son Alan joined the firm in the autumn of 1946 after serving in the navy. He took the position of Sales Director. Donald Alan's brother joined the firm two years later after obtaining an Honours Degree in Natural Sciences at Cambridge University. Donald became the Technical Director.

Donald was encouraged by Percy Norman Shelley to follow his technical and scientific ideas. By 1956 he had been successful in developing and manufacturing the Top Hat Kiln. In May that year Shelley Potteries formed a subsidiary company, Shelley Electric Furnaces Ltd. This company began constructing kilns for other companies. To cope with this work, new premises were built on the site in 1960 and an extension was built in 1964. Since the end of the war, Shelley continued to hold its own on the pottery manufacturing side of the business on both the home and overseas market. New technology was starting to change the face of the pottery industry and the old bottle kilns were becoming redundant. This meant that some smaller family-run firms were finding the costs of these changes beyond their means.

In May 1965 Shelley Potteries Ltd changed their name to Shelley China Ltd. In May 1966 Percy Norman Shelley died. In June 1966 Shelley China Ltd became part of Allied English Potteries (A.E.P.). After fulfilling all outstanding orders, the production of Shelley ware stopped. The factory was named "Montrose Works" and Royal Albert ware was produced at the works until the early eighties. Royal Doulton was also part of A.E.P., along with several other pottery companies, and as Royal Doulton was better known the Royal Doulton name came to the fore. When the factory closed most of the old buildings were demolished.

== Bibliography ==
- History of the Staffordshire Potteries – Simeon Shaw
- Shelley Potteries, The History and Production of a Staffordshire Family of Potters – Watkins, Harvey & Senft ISBN 0 09 143270 7
- The Shelley Style, A Collectors Guide – Susan Hill
- Wileman, A Collectors Guide – Richard Knight & Susam Hill ISBN 0 9516525 3 2
- Shelley Pottery The Later Years – Chris Davenport ISBN 0 9530242 0 2
