= Museum of Arts and Crafts =

Museum of Arts and Crafts may refer to:

- Kentucky Museum of Art and Craft, Louisville, Kentucky, USA
- Musée des Arts et Métiers, Paris, France
- Museum für Kunst und Gewerbe Hamburg, Germany
- Museum of Arts and Crafts, Zagreb, Croatia
- Museum of the American Arts and Crafts Movement, St. Petersburg, Florida, USA
