= Percy Shelley (potter) =

English potter (1860–1937)

Percy Shelley (1860–1937) was an English potter and a major force in developing Shelley Potteries. He was born in Longton, Staffordshire. He attended Owen's College, Manchester and then London University, where he gained a B.A. degree.

In 1881, he joined his father, Joseph, at Wileman & Co. pottery. Shelley had not received any formal training in pottery, but became known first and foremost as a potter and went on to develop the lasting reputation of Shelley China. Wanting to improve the ware that the company was producing and to get a better understanding of the export market, especially America, Shelley went to the US and visited the 1893 Chicago Exhibition.

Joseph Shelley, his father died in June 1896, and Shelley took control of the business. To improve the ware he brought in artists and designers who he felt could (and did) change the company. The best known were Rowland Morris and Frederick Alfred Rhead.

Shelley married in 1890 and his first son, Percy Norman, was born in 1893. One year later twin boys, Vincent Bob and Kenneth Jack, were born. All the sons were known by their middle names. Norman and Bob joined their father in the business just before the start of WW1. After the war they were joined at the factory by their brother Jack who had completed his university course. Each son was to take charge of an area of the company and build on the growing reputation that their father had started.

In 1932, Shelley retired to Bournemouth and died in 1937.

== Bibliography ==
- Shelley Potteries, The History and Production of a Staffordshire Family of Potters, by Chris Watkins, William Harvey & Robert Senft; Barrie & Jenkins; 1980 ISBN 0 09 143270 7
- The Shelley Style, A Collectors Guide by Susan Hill; Jazz Publications; 1990; ISBN 0 9516525 0 8
- Wileman, A Collectors Guide by Richard Knight & Susam Hill; Jazz Publications; 1995; ISBN 0 9516525 3 2
