= Joseph Heinrichs =

German-American metalworker

- Born: February 23, 1866
- Died: Unknown
- Occupation: Metalworker

Joseph Heinrichs (born February 23, 1866), also known as Joseph Heinrich, was a German-American metalworker. He was active in New York City and Paris.

== Early life and career ==
Heinrichs was born in Vital, Adendorf, Rhineland, Prussia. He arrived at New York City on May 10, 1895, and was subsequently established in New York as a molder and finisher of copperware.

By 1897 he had opened his own firm in New York and on July 1, 1902, became a U.S. citizen with silversmith as his occupation. After 1902 he was listed in city directories both at 948 Broadway and at 227 West 29th Street. During his career, he obtained design patents for a variety of coffee pots and drink shakers. He also made hammered silver items for soda fountains.

== Works ==
In 1937 the business ended in bankruptcy. Most of Heinrich's work was retailed by luxury firms, including Black, Starr & Frost, Shreve, Crump & Low, and Tiffany & Co.

His work is collected in the Metropolitan Museum of Art, Dallas Museum of Art, Museum of the American Arts and Crafts Movement, and elsewhere.

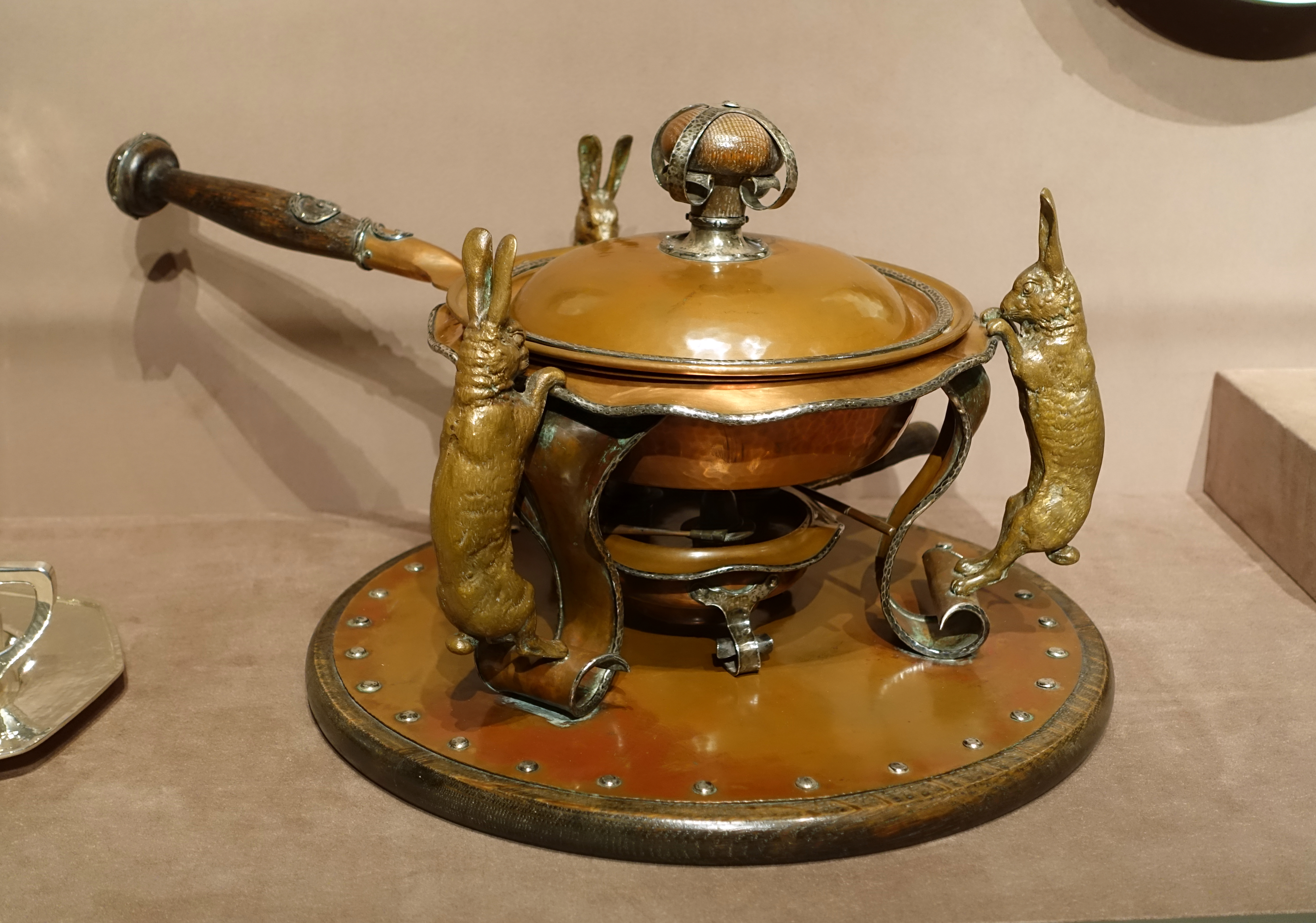
Chafing dish by Joseph Heinrichs, 1904
