= Mabel Lucie Attwell =

British illustrator (1879–1964)

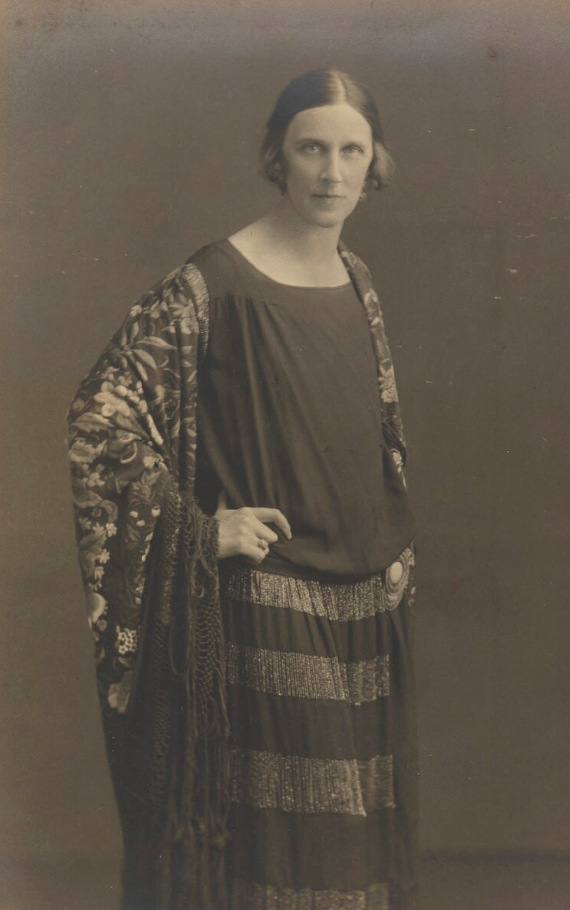
- Attwell, c. 1924
- Born: Mabel Lucie Attwell; 4 June 1879; Mile End, London, England
- Died: 5 November 1964 (aged 85); Fowey, Cornwall, England
- Education: Coopers' Company School; Regent Street Art School; Heatherley Art School
- Occupations: Author and illustrator
- Years active: 1900–1962
- Known for: Illustrations depicting children; pottery designs
- Notable work: Peter Pan (1921)
- Spouse: Harold Cecil Earnshaw (d. 1937)
- Children: 3

Mabel Lucie Attwell (4 June 1879 – 5 November 1964) was a British illustrator and comics artist. She was known for her drawings of children. Her drawings are featured on many postcards, advertisements, posters, books and figurines.

== Biography ==
Attwell was born in Mile End, London, 4 June 1879, the sixth child of butcher Augustus Attwell and his wife Emily Ann. She was educated privately and at the Coopers' Company School and at the Regent Street Art School. She studied at Heatherley's and Saint Martin's School of Art, but left to develop her own interest in imaginary subjects, disliking the emphasis on still-life drawing and classical subjects.

After she sold work to the Tatler and Bystander, she was taken on by the agents Francis and Mills, leading to a long and consistently successful career. In 1908, she married painter and illustrator Harold Cecil Earnshaw (d. 1937) with whom she had a daughter, Marjorie, and two sons. She died at her home in Fowey, Cornwall, on 5 November 1964, after which her business was carried on by her daughter, Marjorie.

== Works ==
Attwell's initial career was founded on magazine illustration, which she continued throughout her life, but around 1900 she began receiving commissions for book illustration, notably for W & R Chambers and the Raphael House Library of Gift Books. Her early works were somewhat derivative of the style of artists such as her friend Hilda Cowham, Jessie Willcox Smith, John Hassall, and the Heath Robinson brothers. From 1914 onwards, she developed her trademark style of sentimental rotund cuddly infants, which became ubiquitous across a wide range of markets: cards, calendars, nursery equipment and pictures, crockery and dolls. During the 1910s Attwell produced a number of posters for London Transport featuring the children to promote travel to Christmas pantomimes and other causes.

She illustrated children's classics such as Mother Goose (1910), Alice in Wonderland (1911), Hans Andersen's Fairy Tales (1914), The Water Babies by Charles Kingsley (1915), and an edition of J. M. Barrie's Peter Pan and Wendy abridged and written by May Byron (1921). For the gift books published by Messrs Raphael Tuck (Mother Goose, Alice in Wonderland, and later volumes including Hans Andersen's Fairy Tales (1913) and Grimms' Fairy Tales (1925)), she provided line drawings as well as "colour work for twelve full-page half-tone plates." Attwell's illustrations caught the attention of Queen Marie of Romania, who wrote children's books and short stories in English. Attwell was invited to spend several weeks at the royal palace in Bucharest in 1922. She also illustrated two long stories of the queen's, which were published by Hodder & Stoughton.

Attwell contributed illustrations to popular periodicals such as Tatler, The Bystander, The Daily Graphic, and The Illustrated London News. She produced advertising illustrations for clients such as Vim, and illustrated greeting cards as well. The Lucie Attwell Annual was published from 1922 to 1974, its continuing publication ten years after her death being made possible by extensive re-use of images.

In 1926 Shelley Potteries commissioned Attwell to produce designs for children's china ware, following the successful sales of china decorated with designs by Hilda Cowham. Attwell’s first six designs portrayed scenes involving children, animals and small green elves in green suits – these were called 'Boo Boos' and used on cups, mugs, bowls etc.

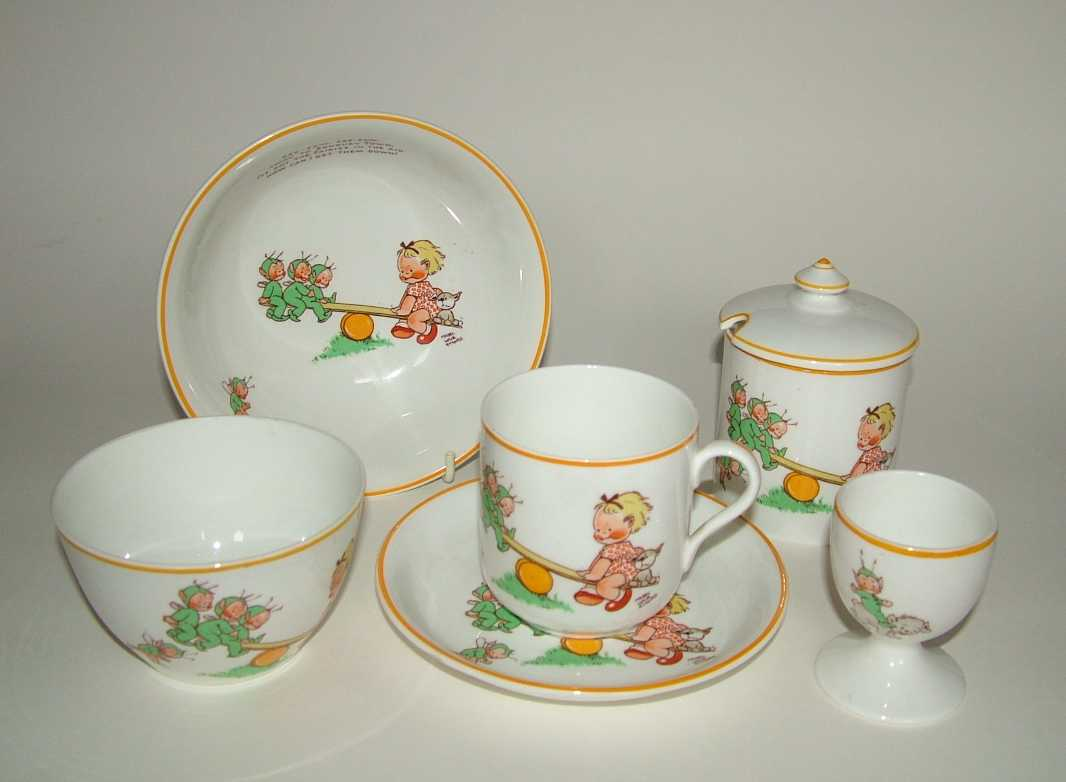
Children's ware designed by Mabel Lucie Attwell

She also produced a tea set, comprising a teapot in the shape of a mushroom house, a sugar bowl in the shape of a mushroom with the top cut off and a milk jug in the shape of a green Boo Boo in a coy saluting pose. The response to these designs was enthusiastic and the Pottery Gazette wrote that they were "a truly irresistible range of nursery ware, altogether in advance of what was usually put before the trade." Her success continued and from 1937 a series of children figures was introduced, followed by a series of small elves in various poses. Attwell continued to produce designs for Shelley ware which was still being manufactured in the 1960s.

Attwell was employed by William Webster, the chairman of Wright's Biscuits in the 1930s to create the Wright's logo, a curly-haired boy called Mischief. There was even a Mischief Club for children, with members getting a collectable badge.

== Comics ==
In 1943 she had her own comic strip, named Wot A Life, published in the magazine Playbox.

== Personal life ==
In 1908, she married painter and illustrator Harold Cecil Earnshaw and became the mother of one daughter and two sons.

== Books by Attwell ==
Early work

- The Boo-Boos Series, Valentine, 1921–22.
- Lucie Attwell’s Annual, Partridge, 1922–1926.
- Baby’s Book, Raphael Tuck, 1922.
- Lucie Attwell’s Children’s Book, Dean, 1927–1932.
- Lucie Attwell’s Annual, Dean, (1926 or 1927?)–1974.
- Lucie Attwell’s Painting Books, Dean, 1934.
- Lucie Attwell’s Great Big Midget Books, Dean, 1934–35.
- Story Books, Dean, 1943–45.
- Jolly Book, 1953.
- Nursery Rhymes Pop-up Book, 1958.
- Book of Verse, 1960.
- Lucie Attwell's ABC Pop-Up Book, 1960.
- Book of Rhymes, Dean, 1962.
