= Taxile Doat =

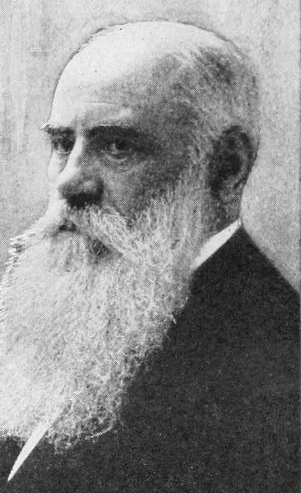
Taxile Doat, published 1912

Taxile Maximin Doat (1851–1939) was a French potter who is primarily known for his experimentation with high-fired porcelain (grand feu) and stoneware using the pâte-sur-pâte technique. His book on these techniques Grand Feu Ceramics was published in 1905 and helped spread his discoveries internationally. His influence is apparent in the types of glazes and approaches used in studio pottery in the twentieth century.

== Biography ==
Doat worked at the Manufacture nationale de Sèvres from 1877 to 1905, and was one of the artists who introduced the Art Nouveau style. Starting in 1895, Doat began working in a house at 47 rue Brancas in the village of Sèvres. These studio ceramics were different from the pieces he produced at the Sèvres factory, which often had small heads or figures in a Renaissance style, placed on fields relying on glaze effects for interest. He now replaced the typical classical subjects: garlands, gods, and drapery with new forms derived from the Japonisme that influenced French art pottery in the 1890s. He also began producing organic forms based on gourds, and employing new, grand feu glazes he invented.

In 1909, Doat was one of the three international leaders of ceramics hired as a professor, along with Frederick Hurten Rhead and Adelaïde Alsop Robineau, at the Art Academy and Porcelain Works, founded in a St. Louis suburb, University City, Missouri. Doat brought with him a collection of 172 examples of his work, which by this time was mostly in his vegetal style. He continued to work in this style in Missouri, making a limited number of shapes in molds, rather than being hand-thrown, with the examples differing greatly in terms of their individual glazing. However, he also taught his old pâte-sur-pâte style there, and some fine examples were produced by his students. He had a considerable influence on American art pottery.

The founder of University City, Edward Gardner Lewis, went bankrupt in 1911, and was no longer able to support the pottery studio. Doat was able to continue pottery production during 1912–14.

== Gallery ==
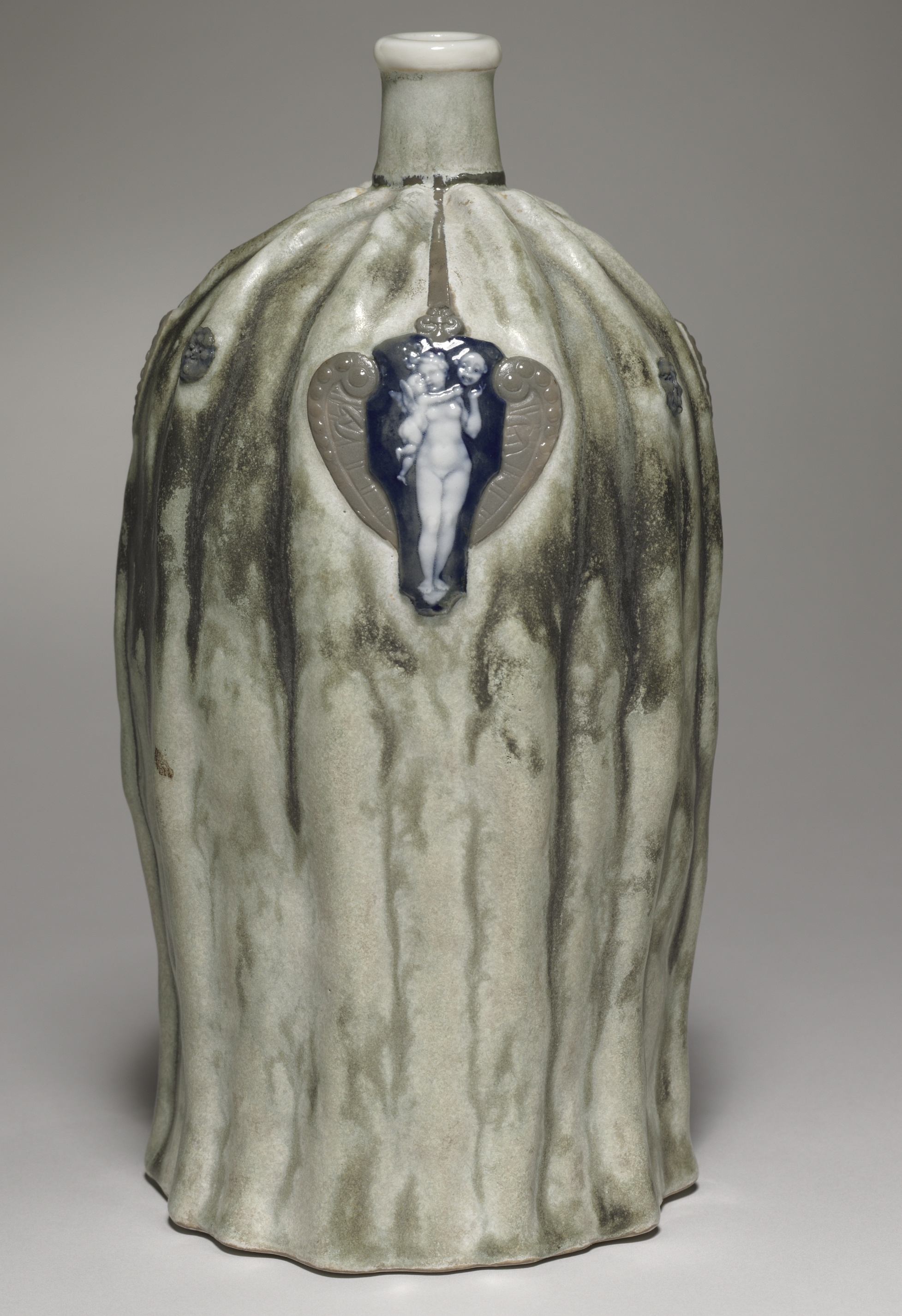
Bottle with figures, 1895, Sèvres porcelain

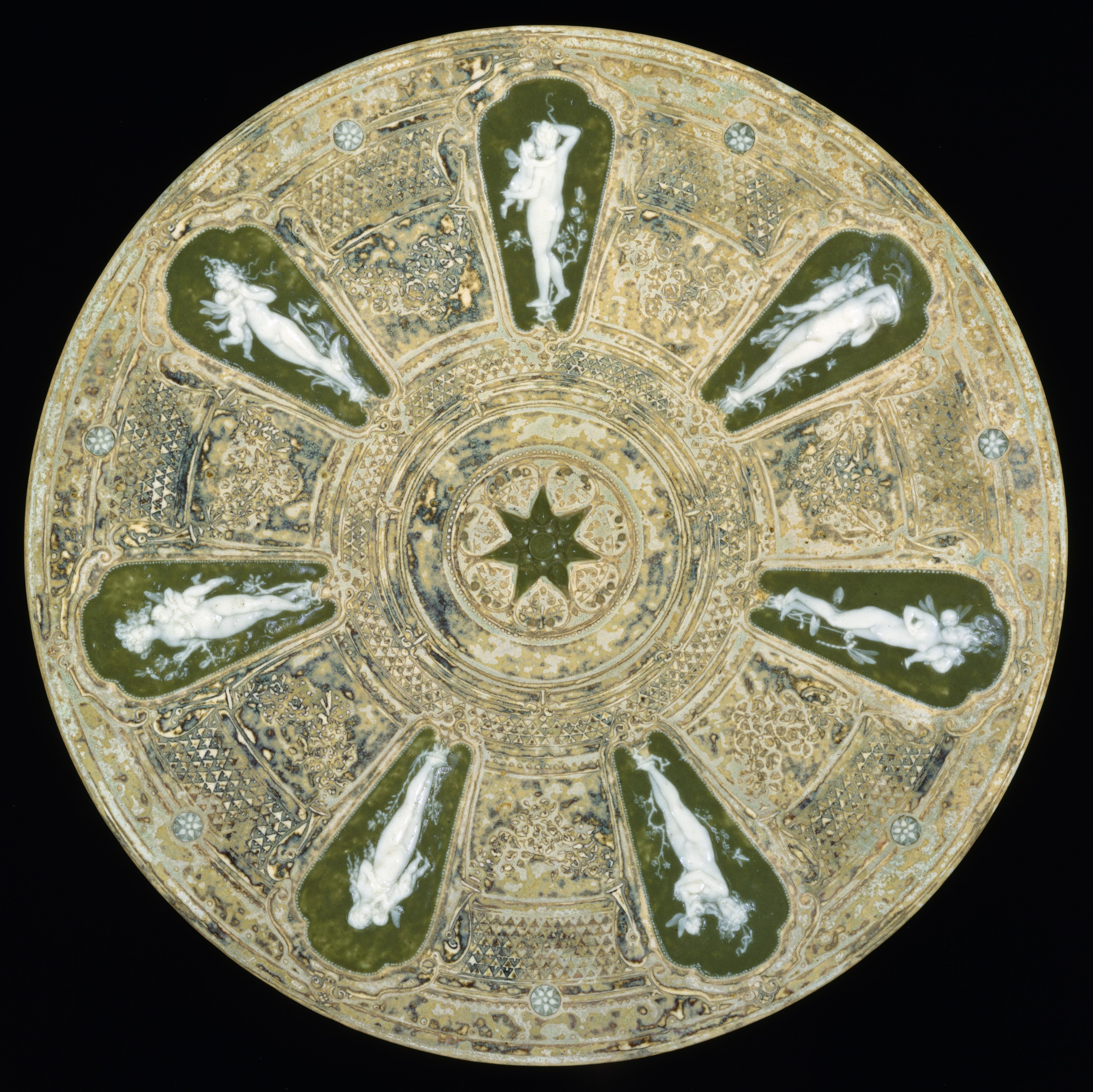
Dish with pâte-sur-pâte cameo inserts, 1900, Sèvres

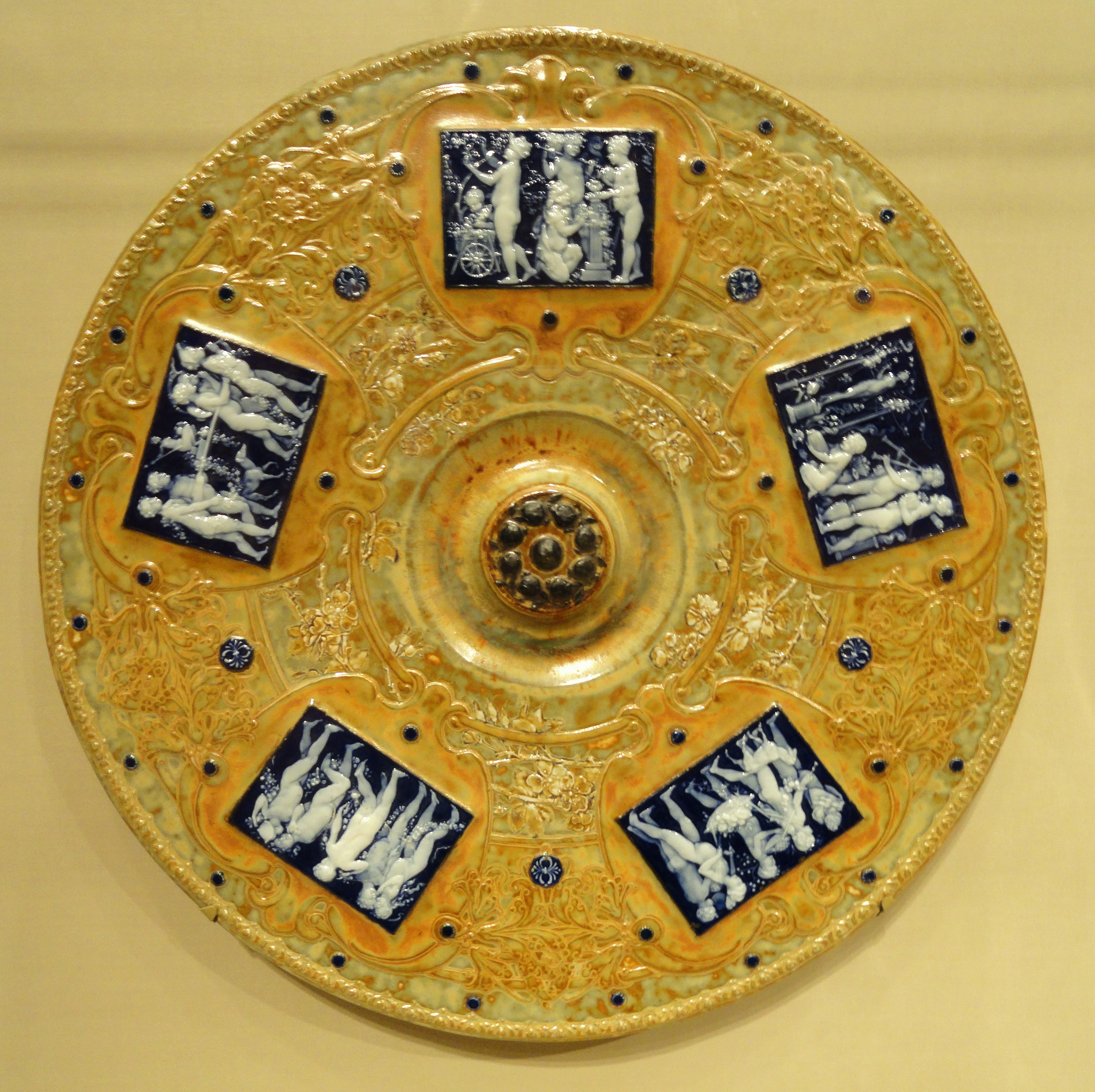
Plaque with pâte-sur-pâte cameo inserts, 1901, Sèvres porcelain

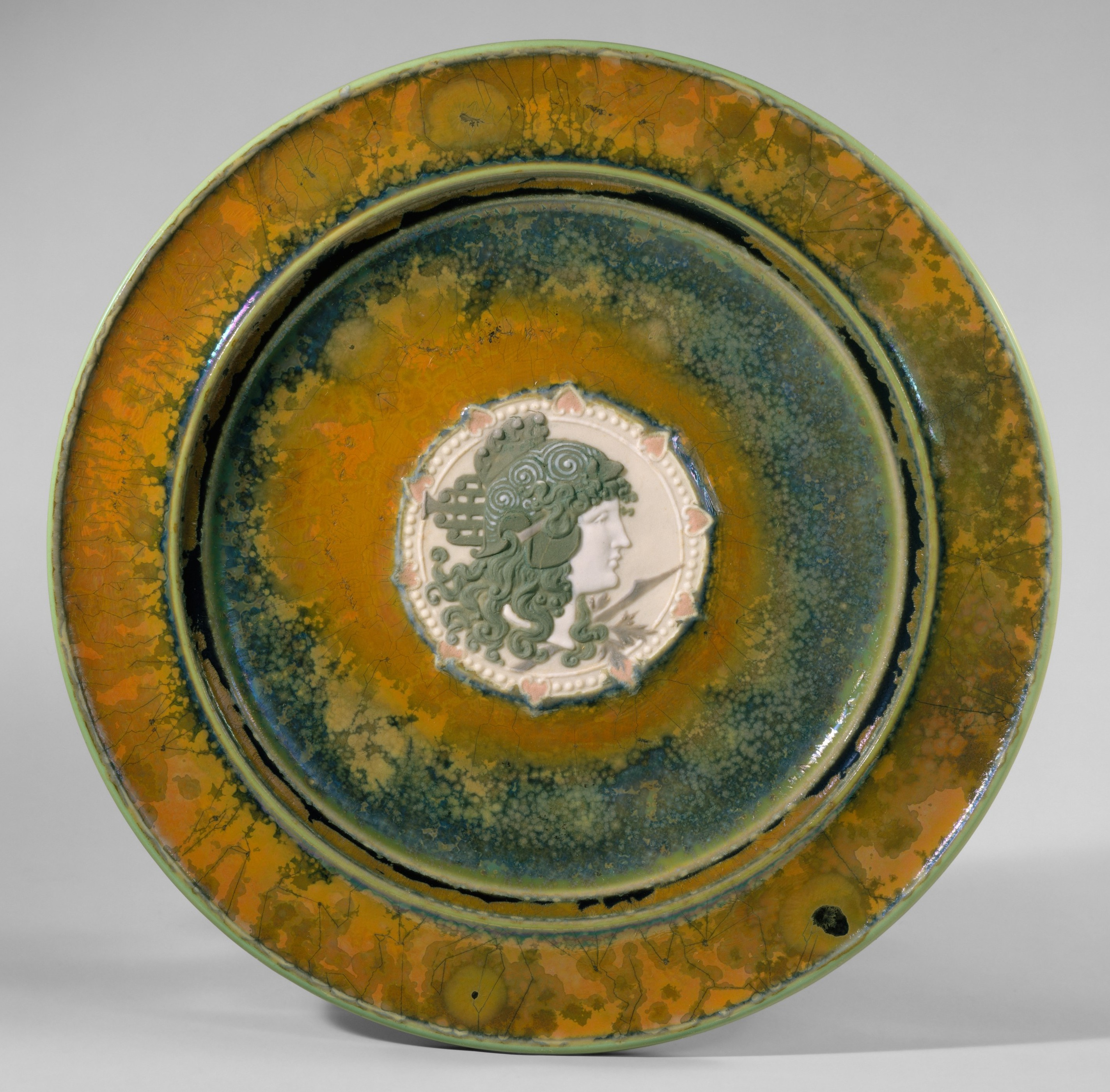
Dish with classical head, 1905, Sèvres porcelain

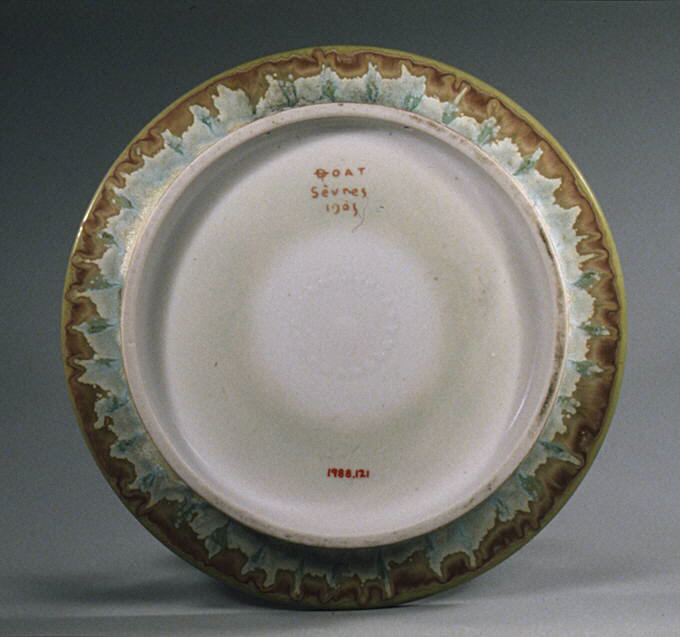
Back of previous dish, with marks

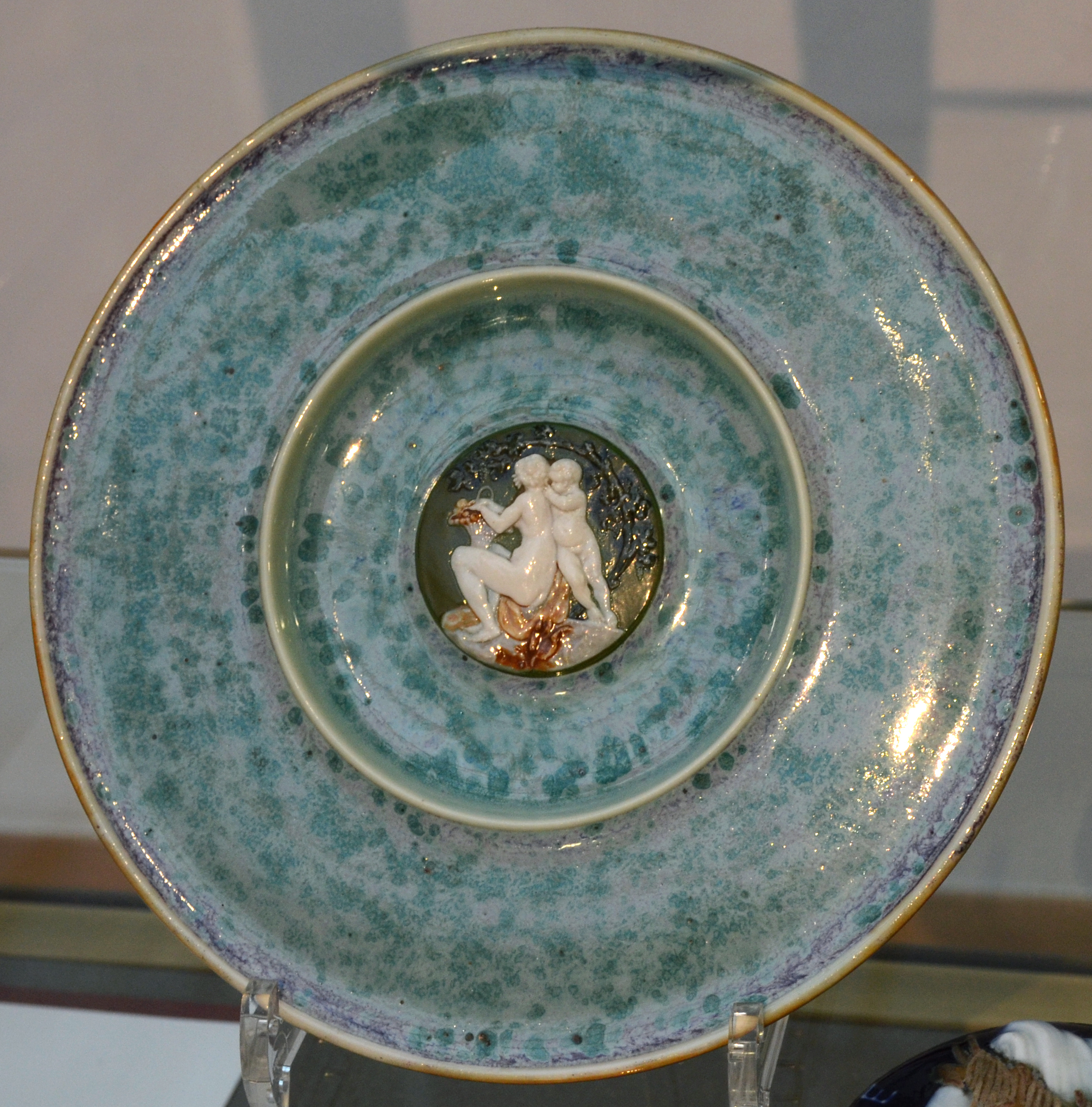
Dish with figures

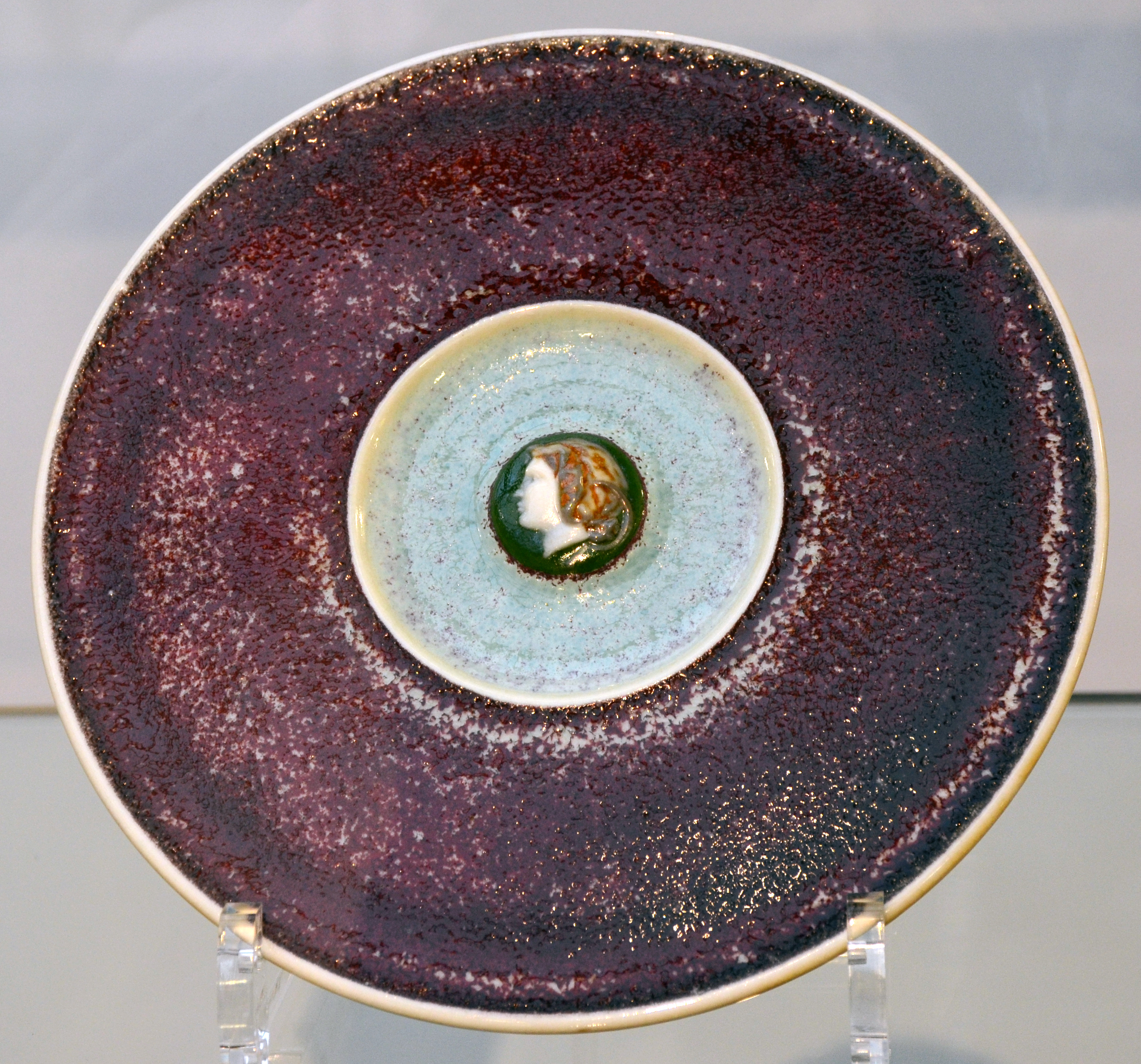
Dish with head

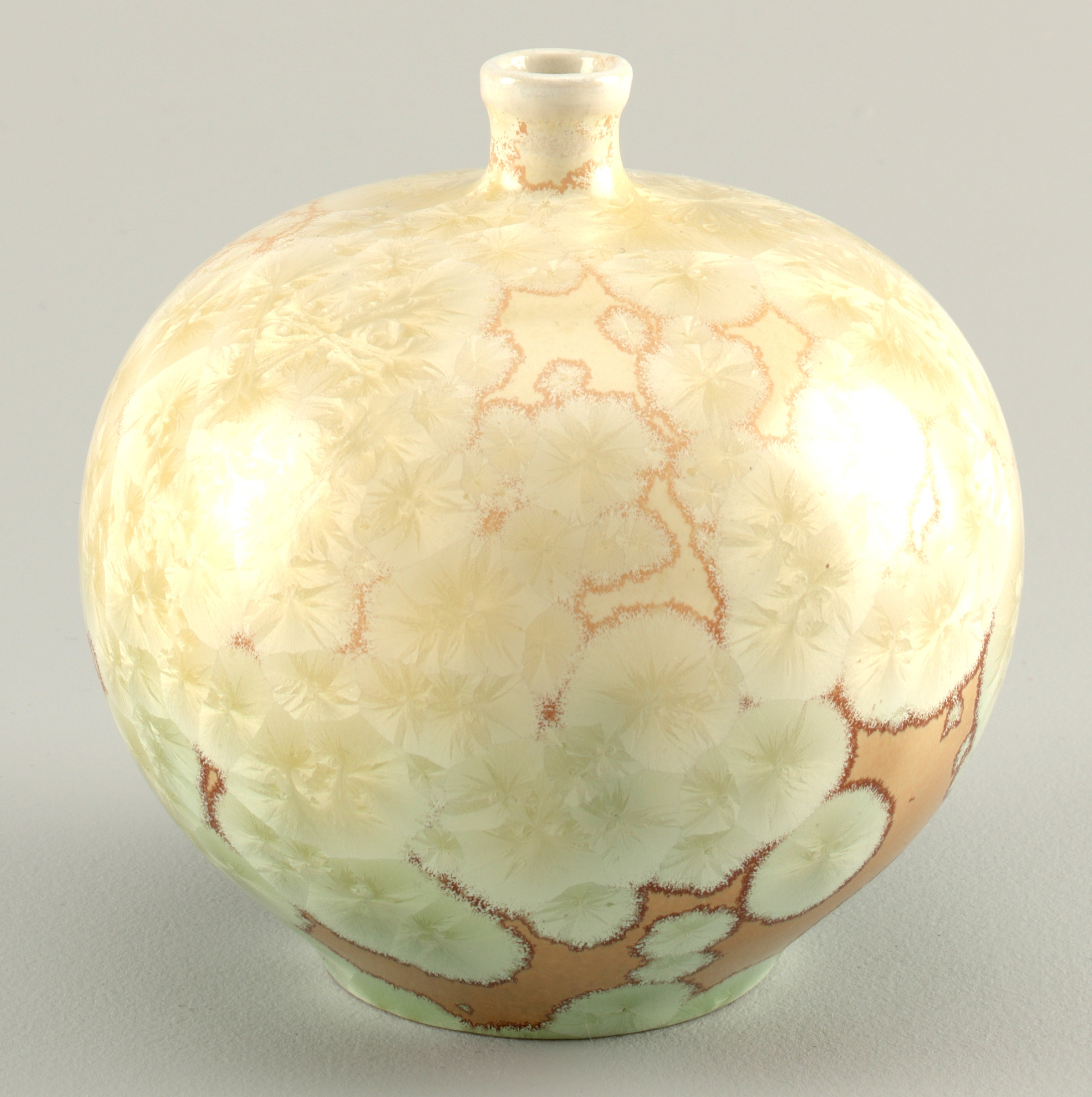
Vase, 1913 (USA)

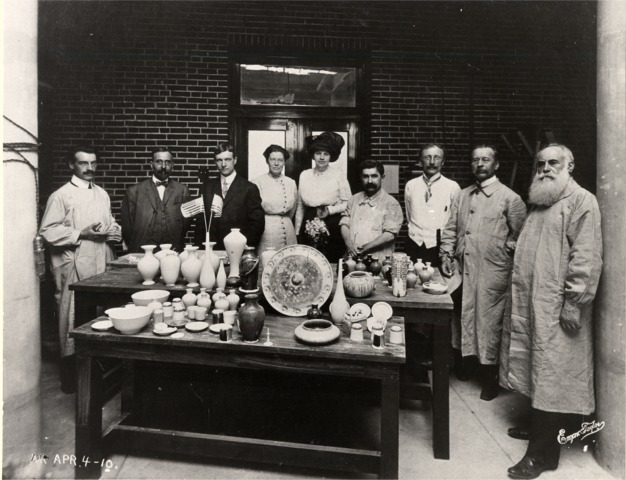
Doat (at far right), Frederick Hurten Rhead (far left), and others at the Art Academy of People's University (now the Lewis Center) in University City, Missouri, celebrating its first high-firing kiln in April 1910

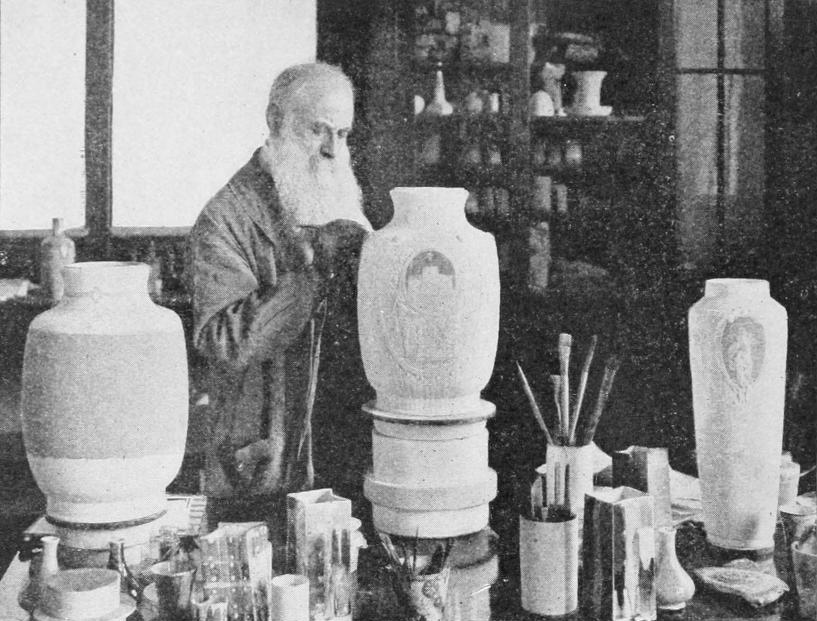
In his studio, published 1912

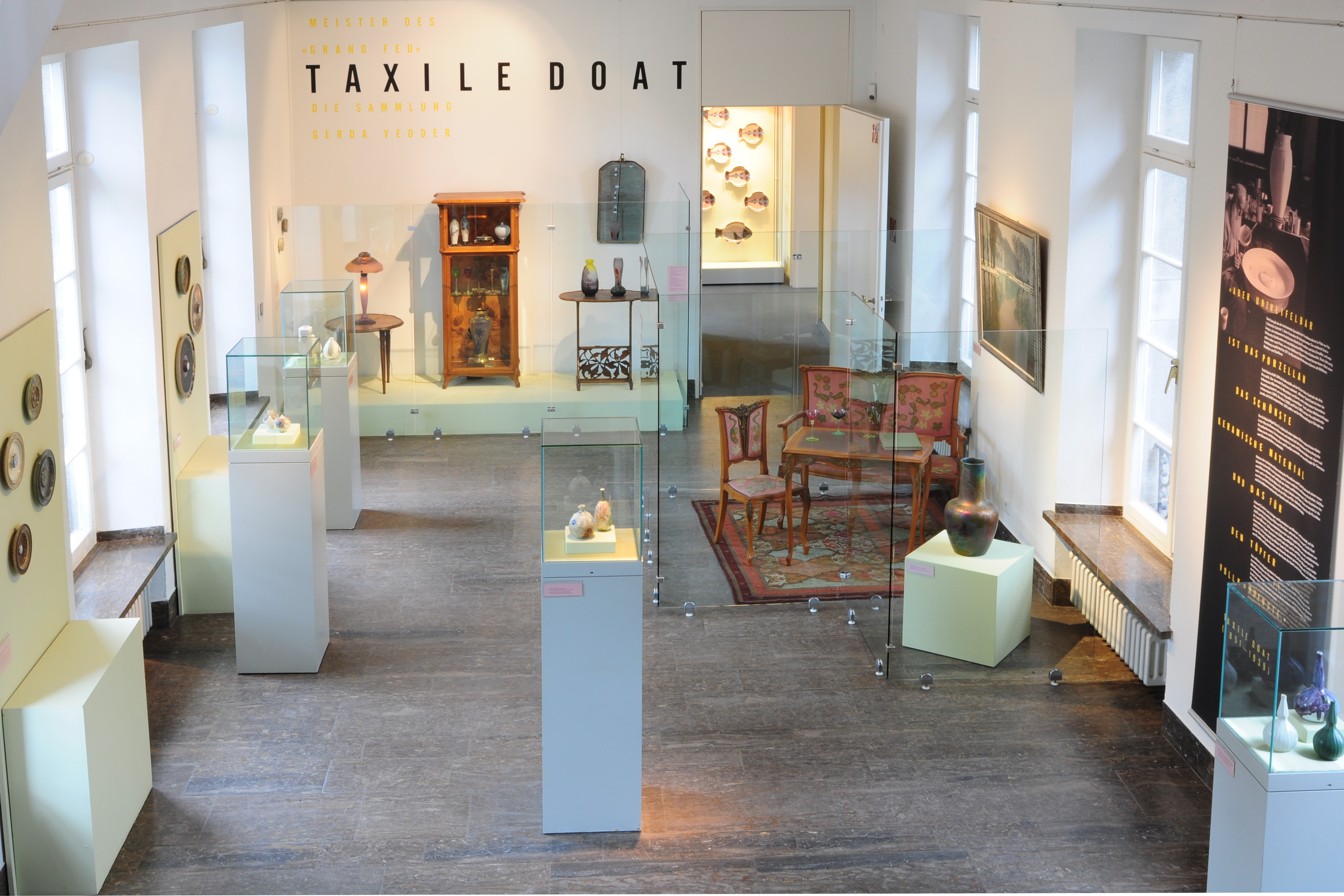
Exhibition on Doat, Hetjens Museum, Düsseldorf, 2014

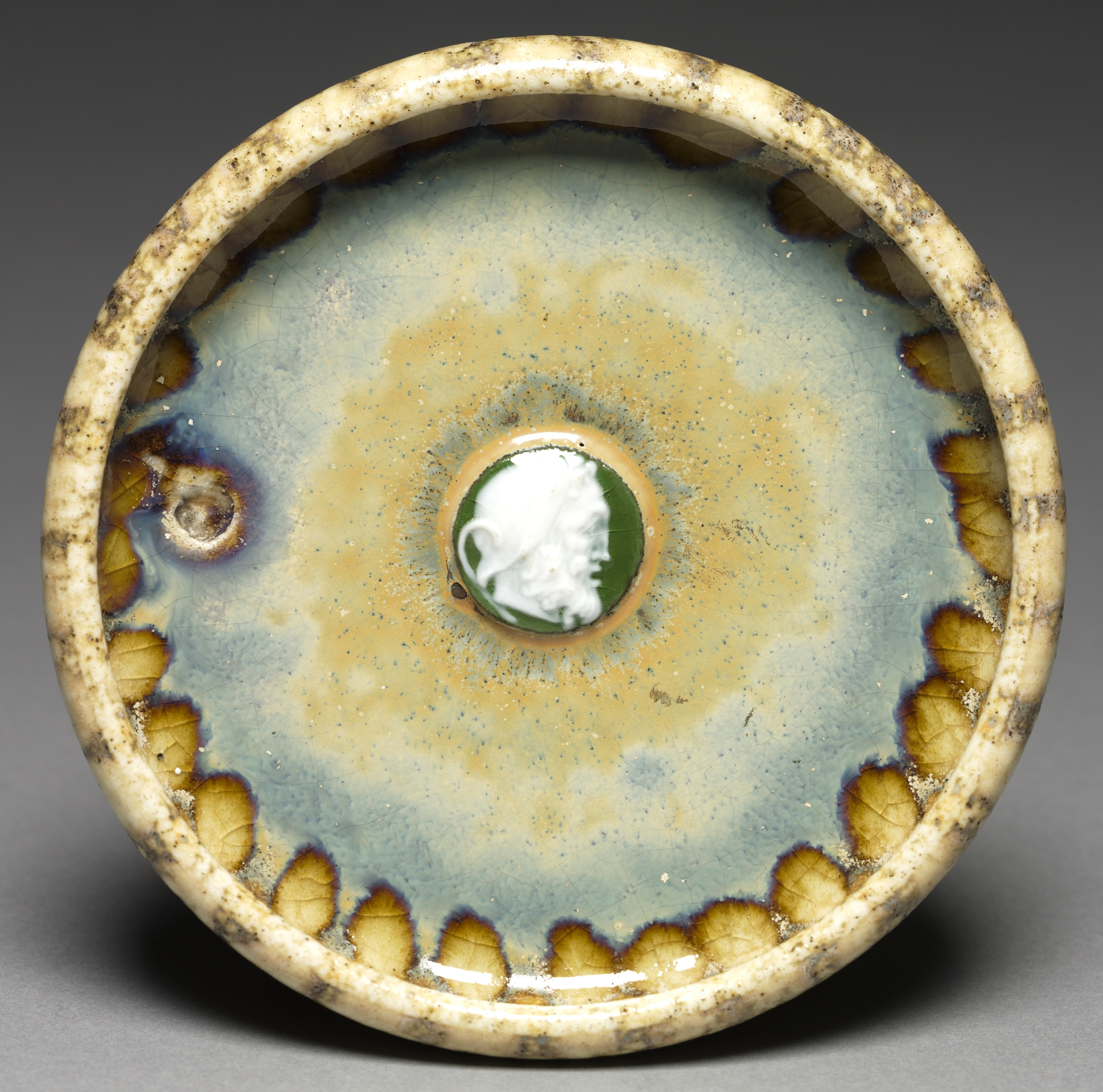
Dish with cameo head, porcelain and stoneware, 1890
