= Frederick Hurten Rhead =

American potter (1880–1942)

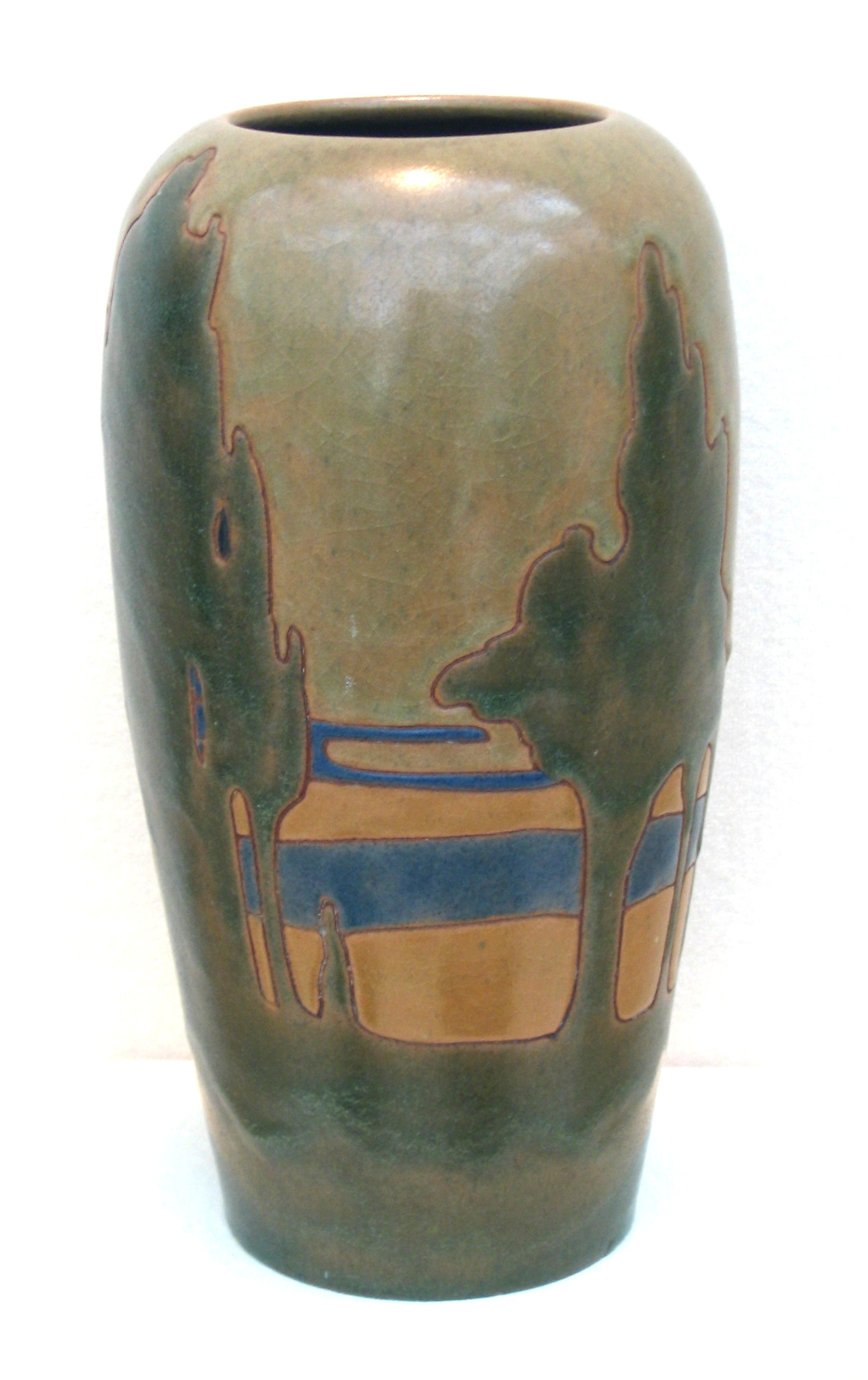
A Rhead vase. A similar vase sold for $516,000 on 10 March 2007 at the Rago Arts and Auction Center, a record amount for a piece of American art pottery.

Frederick Hurten Rhead (1880–1942) was a ceramicist and a major figure in the Arts and Crafts movement. A native of England, he worked as a potter in the United States for most of his career. In addition to teaching pottery techniques, Rhead was highly influential in both studio and commercial pottery. He worked for the Roseville Pottery, established his own Rhead Pottery (1913–1917), and in 1935 designed the highly successful Fiesta ware for Homer Laughlin China Company.

Today, Rhead's work is displayed in major art museums.

== Early life ==
Rhead was born in Hanley, Staffordshire, into a family of potters. His father Frederick Alfred Rhead began his career as an apprentice at Mintons Ltd, where he learned to be a pâte-sur-pâte artist. He went on to work in a number of other potteries, including a business of his own which failed. Young Frederick's mother Adolphine (née Hurten) also came from an artistic family. Frederick Hurten's siblings included Charlotte Rhead, a talented designer who remained in England; and Harry Rhead, who followed his brother to work in the United States.

== Education and early career ==
Rhead was educated in the Potteries District of Staffordshire, where he lived until he emigrated to the US. At that time the conurbation consisted of separate towns, which have since united as the city of Stoke-on-Trent. Rhead went to school in Hanley. He served an apprenticeship in Burslem under his father and attended classes at the Wedgwood Institute in the same town. After completing his education, Rhead taught art in Longton. He became art director of a pottery called Wardle and Co. in Hanley. His sister Charlotte also joined the firm.

== Career in USA ==
In 1902, Frederick Hurten Rhead emigrated to the United States, where his uncle Louis Rhead (1858–1926) was a successful graphic designer in New York.

Emigrants from Stoke-on-Trent, where ceramics was the dominant industry, tended to settle in such places as Trenton, New Jersey, or, as in Frederick Rhead's case, Ohio. Both areas had pottery industries to exploit the clay deposits. Rhead's first USA position was managing a small art pottery at Tiltonville, Ohio, which changed its name from Vance Faience to Avon Faience in 1902. Pieces from Rhead's time at this pottery rarely come on the market. Production at Tiltonville was being transferred to nearby Wheeling, and in 1904, Rhead left to work as a designer for the Weller pottery in Zanesville, Ohio, but he did not stay there long. In 1904, Rhead became art director at the Roseville Pottery in Zanesville. Roseville was a large pottery which produced some art pottery as well as more utilitarian lines. In 1908 the company reduced the amount of handcrafting in its production, and the following year Rhead moved to University City, Missouri, although his brother Harry stayed on at Roseville.

=== University City ===
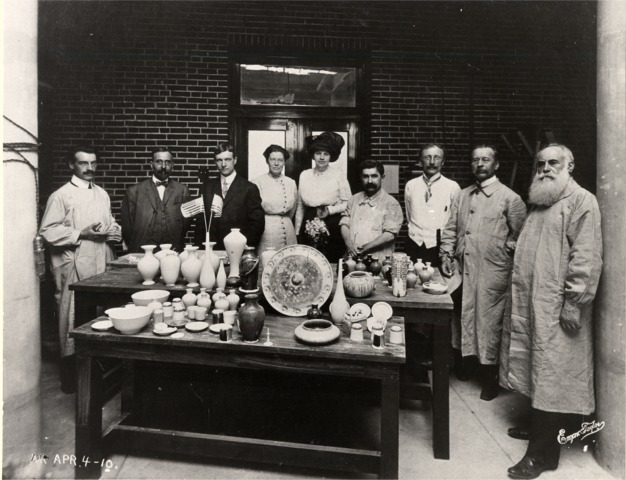
Frederick Hurten Rhead (at far left), Taxile Doat (far right), and others at the Art Academy of People's University (now the Lewis Center) in University City, Missouri, celebrating its first high-firing kiln in April 1910.

Rhead, along with American potter Adelaïde Alsop Robineau and French potter Taxile Doat, was recruited by Edward Gardner Lewis, the founder of University City, to teach at the People's University there. This institution specialized in what is now called distance learning and was then usually called correspondence school. Rhead created a pottery correspondence course, although some pottery students also resided at the Art Academy. After Lewis became bankrupt in 1911, he ceased supporting the pottery studio. Taxile Doat continued pottery production at University City for a few years, but the Rheads moved to California.

Apart from teaching, Rhead produced some vases and tiles at University City, sometimes working with his wife Agnes. In October 2012, a four-tile panel by Rhead sold for US$637,500 at auction in the US. It was bought on behalf of the Museum of the American Arts and Crafts Movement, currently under construction in St. Petersburg, Florida. The 20 3/4-inch-square panel, depicting a peacock, was made in 1910.

=== California ===
Rhead's first California position was in Marin County at the Arequipa tuberculosis sanatorium. The director had decided to offer pottery classes to the patients. The Arequipa Pottery, which opened in 1911, was a sideline for the sanatorium, but Rhead was ambitious in his plans. He sourced suitable clays, experimented with glazes and taught decorative techniques such as tubelining (a technique also associated with his sister Charlotte). Rhead's methods were not regarded by the management as sufficiently businesslike. In 1913 he was replaced at the Arequipa Pottery by Albert Solon, another potter from Staffordshire, who reduced production costs.

Rhead remained in California, starting his own pottery studio in Santa Barbara in late 1913 or early 1914. Operating until 1917, the Rhead Pottery produced ware which is now highly valued. In 2007 a Rhead vase from this period set the record, subsequently overtaken, as the most expensive American art pottery at auction.

=== Return to Ohio ===
In the later part of his career, Rhead worked in larger-scale, more commercial production. Rhead returned to Zanesville, where he worked for American Encaustic Tiling Company. The words encaustic tile refer to the 19th-century revival of a medieval technique for the production of floor tiles. During Rhead's time, the company combined production of some art tiles (for fireplaces, etc.) with large-scale production of more utilitarian ware. American Encaustic was reputed at one time to operate the largest tileworks in the world. It was forced to close in the 1930s, a victim of the Great Depression.

== Fiesta ware ==
In 1927 Rhead was hired as art director of the Homer Laughlin China Company in Newell, West Virginia. He continued in the position until his death in 1942.

In the 1930s, Rhead conceived and designed a line of glazed dinnerware called Fiesta. It was based on a spherical theme in Art Deco style. The pottery came in five colours. The concept was that the customer could acquire pieces of different colours to mix and match according to taste. Introduced to the public in January 1936, the line was an immediate success. The idea of mixed solid colours on dinnerware was not new but Rhead's version was more successful. Such a concept had previously been marketed by two California potteries, the Catalina Pottery of Santa Catalina Island in the early 1930s and the Bauer Pottery.

The Homer Laughlin Company expanded the line with new shapes, and eventually new glaze colours as well. It became the best-selling line of dinnerware in the US. Rhead designed a similar line called "Harlequin", which was sold in Woolworth's, an important customer of Homer Laughlin.

Frederick Hurten Rhead died in New York City in November 1942 from cancer.

== Legacy and honours ==
Rhead was active in two different fields: studio pottery and industrial ceramics, where there was sometimes less scope for artistic originality.

Rhead's pottery is displayed by major American museums, including the Metropolitan Museum of Art. His American work can command very high prices, although his English work remains much more modestly priced.

The mass-produced Fiesta designs may be his best known achievement, as the line has remained in production since 1936, although not continuously. After Rhead's death, the production of "Fiesta" ran into problems related to war-time conditions. The United States Government took control of all available uranium to develop the atomic bomb. An oxide of uranium was necessary to produce the vibrant orange-red glaze of Fiesta. Without that key color, and with the severe reduction in variety of open-stock items available, the appeal of the line suffered. Consumer interest in, and sales of, the line did remain strong for some time. Despite the introduction of a new palette of glaze colours, sales progressively declined over the following 27 years until the entire line was discontinued in January 1973.

After an absence of 13 years, the line was revived with an altered clay body and glaze composition. This second incarnation of Fiesta dinnerware was first marketed in early 1986 to capitalise on the 50th anniversary of the original line's introduction. In addition, popular taste was embracing vintage design.

Some vintage Fiesta casting moulds designed by Rhead were used in production of the new ware. Most shapes had to be slightly altered, or completely redesigned to meet the requirements of the new materials.

== Annotated references ==
- Bumpus, Bernard Collecting Rhead Pottery: Charlotte, Frederick, Frederick Hurten, 1999
- Bumpus, Bernard Rhead Artists and Potters 1870–1950 – catalogue of exhibition at the Geffrye Museum, 1986.

Bernard Bumpus (1921–2004) was the leading authority on the Rhead family, and knew a great deal about Frederick Hurten Rhead's background in England. In 1986 Bumpus curated an exhibition at the Geffrye Museum, London, called Rhead Artists and Potters. It toured other museums including the Potteries Museum & Art Gallery in Stoke-on-Trent. Bumpus hoped to take a version of the exhibition to the US, but, despite American interest in the Rhead family, he was not able to obtain the necessary funding.

- Dale, Sharon Frederick Hurten Rhead: an English Potter in America, 1986, Erie Art Museum

A detailed study with good illustrations. It was published in connection with an exhibition held in 1986. It is better on Rhead's American career than his English background.
