= Hilda Cowham =

English illustrator (1873–1964)

Hilda Gertrude Cowham
- Born: 29 July 1873; Westminster, London, England
- Died: 28 September 1964 (aged 91); Shalford, Surrey, England
- Known for: Illustration
- Spouse: Edgar Lander

Hilda Gertrude Cowham (29 July 1873 – 28 September 1964) was an English illustrator, famous for her work on children's books and ceramic nurseryware.

== Biography ==
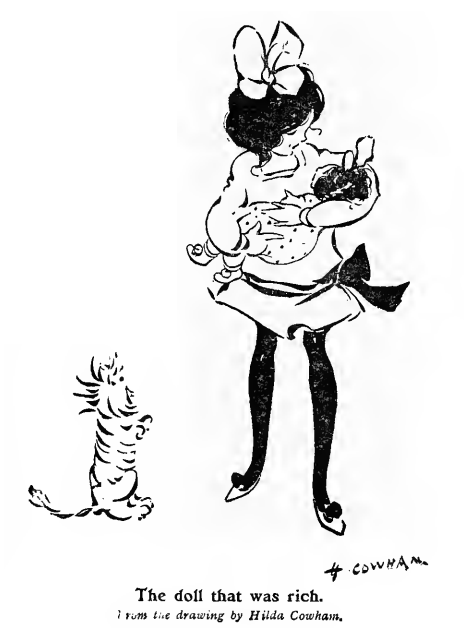
The Doll That Was Rich (1916)

Hilda Cowham was born at the Wesleyan Training College on Horseferry Road in Westminster on 29 July 1873. She was a student at Wimbledon School of Art (where she studied modelling with Alfred Drury), Lambeth School of Art, and the Royal College of Art. She was one of the first women illustrators to publish in Punch. Her work was also published in The Sketch, The Graphic and other magazines and periodicals.

She illustrated children's books, such as Fiddlesticks (1900), Peter Pickle and his dog Fido (1906), Curly Heads and Long Legs (1914), and Blacklegs and Others (1911). One of her characters, a "bush haired, black stockinged imp with big sash bow and infinitesimal petticoats", became famous as the "Cowham child" and was widely imitated. In the 1930s Cowham designed a number of posters for London Underground.

In the period 1924 to 1935, she and her friend Mabel Lucie Attwell were employed by Shelley Potteries Ltd to provide illustrations for baby's plate and nurseryware.

Cowham was married to Edgar Lander, also an artist; they had one son.

She died in Shalford, Surrey on 28 September 1964, and was cremated.
