= Museum of the American Arts and Crafts Movement =

Museum in Florida, US

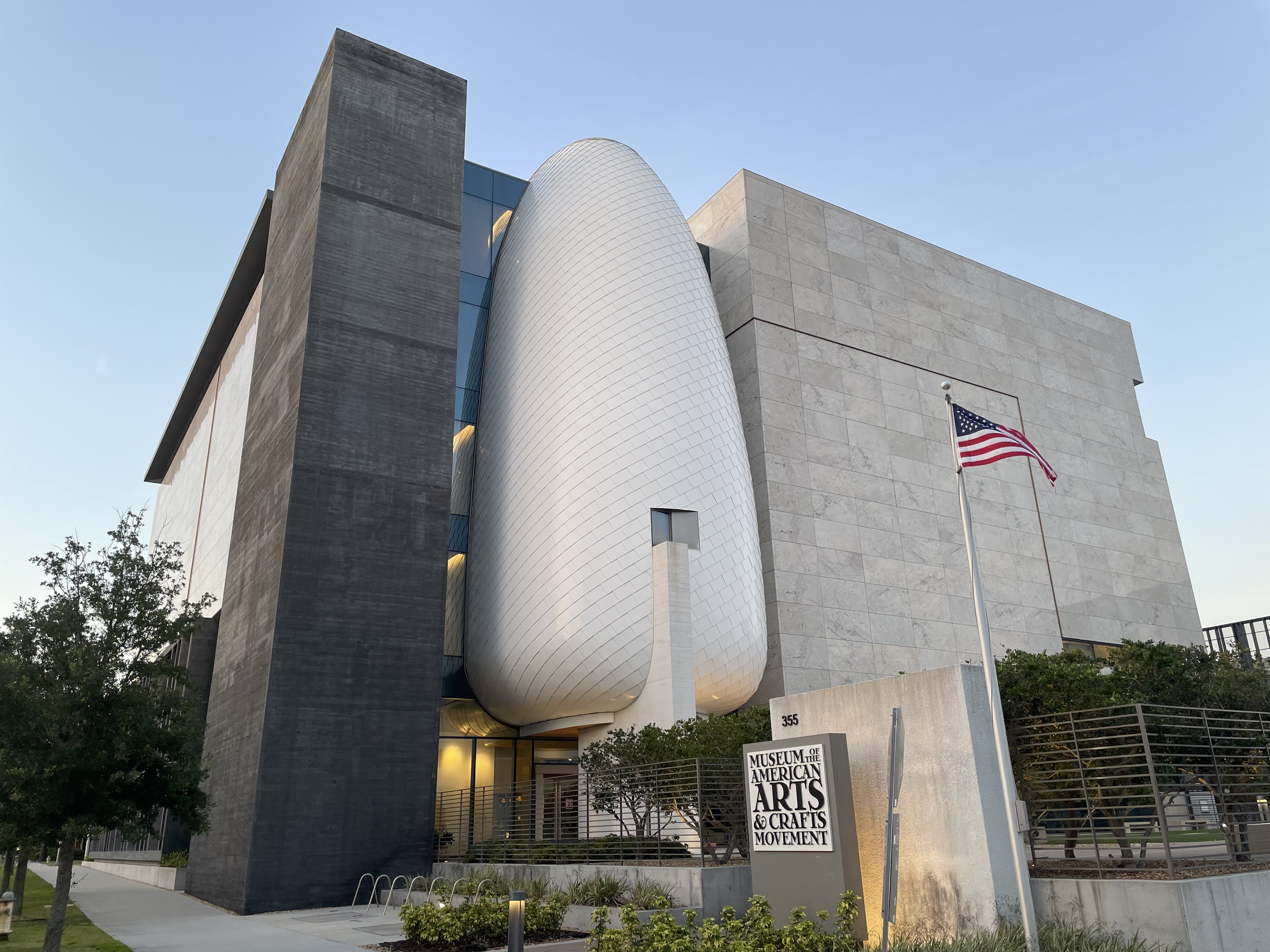
- Established: September 7, 2021
- Location: St. Petersburg, Florida, U.S.
- Coordinates: 27.776036°N 82.638488°W
- Type: Art museum
- Collections: Fine arts, furniture, jewelry, lighting, metalwork, photography, pottery, textiles, tiles, woodblocks, and period room installations from the American Arts and Crafts movement (c. 1880-1920)
- Collection size: 2,000+
- Founder: Rudy Ciccarello
- Owner: Two Red Roses Foundation
- Nearest parking: On site
- Website: www.museumaacm.org

The Museum of the American Arts and Crafts Movement (MAACM) is located in downtown St. Petersburg, Florida, and exhibits an extensive collection of fine and decorative arts from the American Arts and Crafts movement (c. 1880-1920).

The Museum, founded by art collector, entrepreneur, and philanthropist Rodolfo "Rudy" Ciccarello, opened to the public on September 7, 2021. The museum is funded by an endowment from the Two Red Roses Foundation, established in 2004 by Ciccarello and dedicated to the acquisition, restoration, preservation, and public exhibition of important examples from the American Arts and Crafts movement.

== History ==
Originally named The American Craftsman Museum, Ciccarello presented his plans for a permanent home for his personal collection of American Arts and Crafts furniture and artwork to the city of Tampa in 2012. The 75,000 square-foot (7,000 m^{2}) museum and adjoining restaurant was proposed for a site at the edge of Curtis Hixon Waterfront Park, along the Hillsborough River and across from the Tampa Museum of Art and Glazer Children's Museum. When he and the city were unable to agree on financial terms, Ciccarello chose to forgo government assistance in favor of a privately-funded facility.

Ciccarello, who founded a pharmaceutical distribution business, became interested in the Arts and Crafts movement in 1997 after seeing a reproduction of a bookcase in the style of Gustav Stickley, a furniture manufacturer and major influence on American Craftsman architecture. Later that year, Ciccarello purchased an original Stickley bookcase on auction in Boston, Massachusetts, marking the start of what would become the Museum of the American Arts and Crafts Movement's collection.

In recent years, Ciccarello has begun to collect the work of early 20th century photographers from the Pictorialism and Photo-Secession movements, including Alvin Langdon Coburn, Edward S. Curtis, and Alfred Stieglitz.

Kevin W. Tucker, the former Margot B. Perot Senior Curator of Decorative Arts and Design with the Dallas Museum of Art was appointed the inaugural Director of the MAACM in 2015.

== Building ==
Designed by Ciccarello and Tampa-based Alfonso Architects, the building's architecture and materials reflect the core tenets of the Arts and Crafts movement, including: close ties to the natural world, environmental unity, and "truth to materials."

At a construction cost of $90 million, the five-story, 137,000-square-foot (12,700 m^{2}) museum includes 40,000 square-feet of gallery space, a reference library, 100-seat auditorium, glass-working studio, gift shop, and café.

In 2025, the Museum announced plans for a 10,000 square-foot expansion, adding additional gallery space and redesigning the building's courtyard. Construction is underway and is projected to complete in late 2026.

== Exhibitions ==
The Museum's current exhibitions include: Masterpieces: Extraordinary Works from the Two Red Roses Foundation (2024-present) and Arthur Wesley Dow: His Beloved Ipswich - Photographs, Paintings, and Prints (2022-present).

Past exhibitions include: American Arts & Crafts Color Woodblock Prints (2022-2023), Designing the New: Charles Rennie Mackintosh and the Glasgow Style (2022), Lenses Embracing the Beautiful: Pictorial Photographs from the Two Red Roses Foundation (2021-2022), and Love, Labor, and Art: The Roycroft Enterprise (2021-2022).

== Permanent Collection ==
The Museum's permanent collection includes works by include Gustav Stickley, the Stickley Brothers, Charles Rohlfs, the Byrdcliffe Colony, the Roycrofters, Dirk Van Erp, William Grueby, the Saturday Evening Girls, Rookwood Pottery, Tiffany Studios, Newcomb Pottery, Marblehead, Frederick Hurten Rhead, Adelaide Alsop Robineau, Frederick Walrath, the Overbeck sisters, Margaret Patterson, and Arthur Wesley Dow. Photographers include Alfred Stieglitz, Edward Steichen, Gertrude Käsebier, and Alvin Langdon Coburn.

The Museum also features several period installations, including a complete wood-paneled room designed by Greene and Greene, a custom-tiled bathroom, a boathouse floor by Grueby Faience & Tile Company, and a 600-tile mural from Rookwood Pottery.
