= Adelaide Alsop Robineau =

American artist (1865–1929)

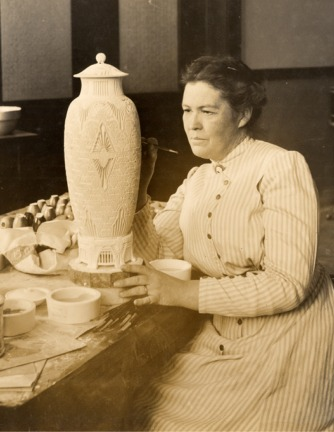
- Robineau at work on Scarab Vase, c. 1910
- Born: Adelaide Alsop; 1865; Middletown, Connecticut, U.S.
- Died: 1929 (aged 63–64); Syracuse, New York, U.S.
- Known for: studio pottery
- Notable work: Scarab Vase, 1910
- Movement: American art pottery
- Spouse: Samuel E. Robineau

Adelaide Alsop Robineau (1865–1929) was an American china painter and potter. She experimented with American clays to create a true high-fire porcelain, and explored forms, decorations, and glazes. She is considered one of the top ceramists of American art pottery in her era. Her most famous work, the Scarab Vase, took over 1000 hours to make. In 2000, Art & Antiquities magazine named it the most important piece of American ceramics of the last hundred years.

From 1899-1919, Adelaide and her husband Samuel E. Robineau published Keramic Studio, a periodical for potters and ceramic artists. For much of this time, Adelaide Robineau was the magazine's sole editor. She established a ceramic studio and taught china painting and pottery at her Four Winds Pottery School in Syracuse, New York. She also taught at Syracuse University (1920–1929) and the Art Academy of People's University.

== Early life and education ==
Adelaide Alsop was born in 1865 in Middletown, Connecticut. She developed an early interest in both drawing and the then–popular pursuit of china painting. As a young woman, she helped to support her family by teaching drawing at the boarding school where she had formerly been a student. During one summer break, she enrolled in the painter William Merritt Chase's summer school, her only experience of advanced training in painting and drawing. She later studied ceramics with Charles Binns at Alfred University and with Taxile Doat.

In 1899, she married Samuel E. Robineau, a French ceramics expert who was at one time editor of Old China magazine. The couple had three children.

== Pottery ==
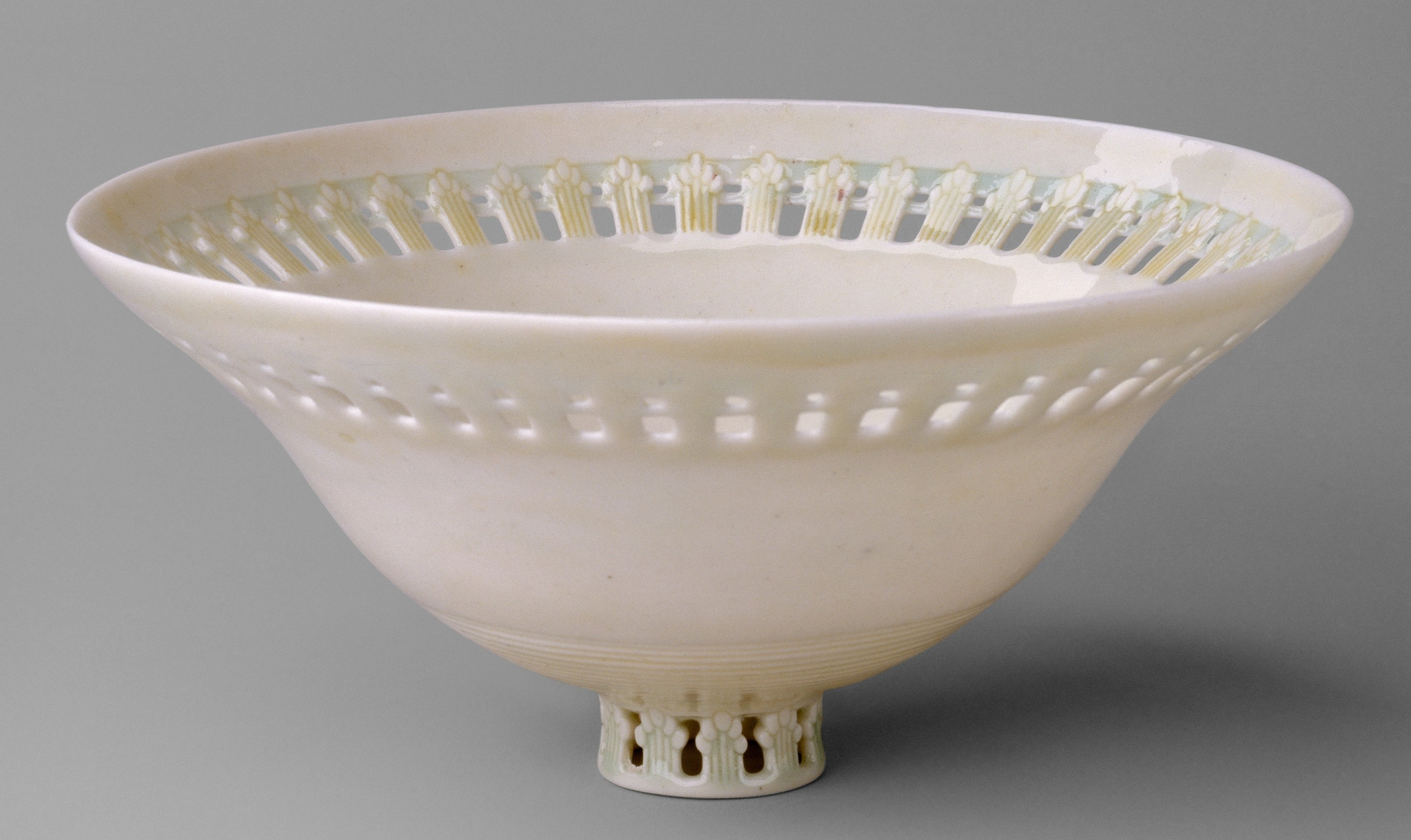
Porcelain openwork bowl, 1924

In 1899, Robineau and her husband launched Keramic Studio, a periodical for potters and ceramic artists that continued in print until 1919. Within a few years, Robineau became the magazine's sole editor. Around the same time, the couple moved to Syracuse, New York, where their house was designed by architect Katharine Budd. Robineau later built a ceramic studio next to the house. She taught china painting and pottery at her Four Winds Pottery School and sold her painted china, watercolors, and ceramics.

Robineau began seriously making ceramics around 1901, by which time she already had a reputation as a china painter. She became convinced that painting over the glaze — then a common technique — was the wrong approach and began to experiment with other procedures. She worked primarily in porcelain, experimenting with American clays to create a true high-fire porcelain. She also experimented with a wide range of forms, decorations, and glazes, with frequent use of multicolored, opalescent, and iridescent glazes. Her mature work shows Art Nouveau and Japonisme influences in the use of stylized botanical and animal elements. At a time when many noted china painters worked with blanks made by other people, she handled all phases of the process herself, from forming the pots to incising and painting them. Some of the detail work on her pieces was so fine that she employed crochet needles and dental tools to get the desired effect.

Many of Robineau's works are containers, including her most famous work, the Scarab Vase, a tall, incised porcelain vase that took over 1000 hours to make. In 2000, Art & Antiquities magazine named it the most important piece of American ceramics of the last hundred years.

Robineau taught at both Syracuse University (1920–1929) and the Art Academy of People's University, an institution founded by Edward Gardner Lewis in Missouri.

Before her death in 1929, she designed a cinerary urn that now holds the ashes of both Robineau and her husband in Syracuse, New York.

Her work is in the collections of the Metropolitan Museum of Art, Everson Museum of Art, Detroit Institute of Arts, Cranbrook Art Museum, and other institutions.

== Gallery ==
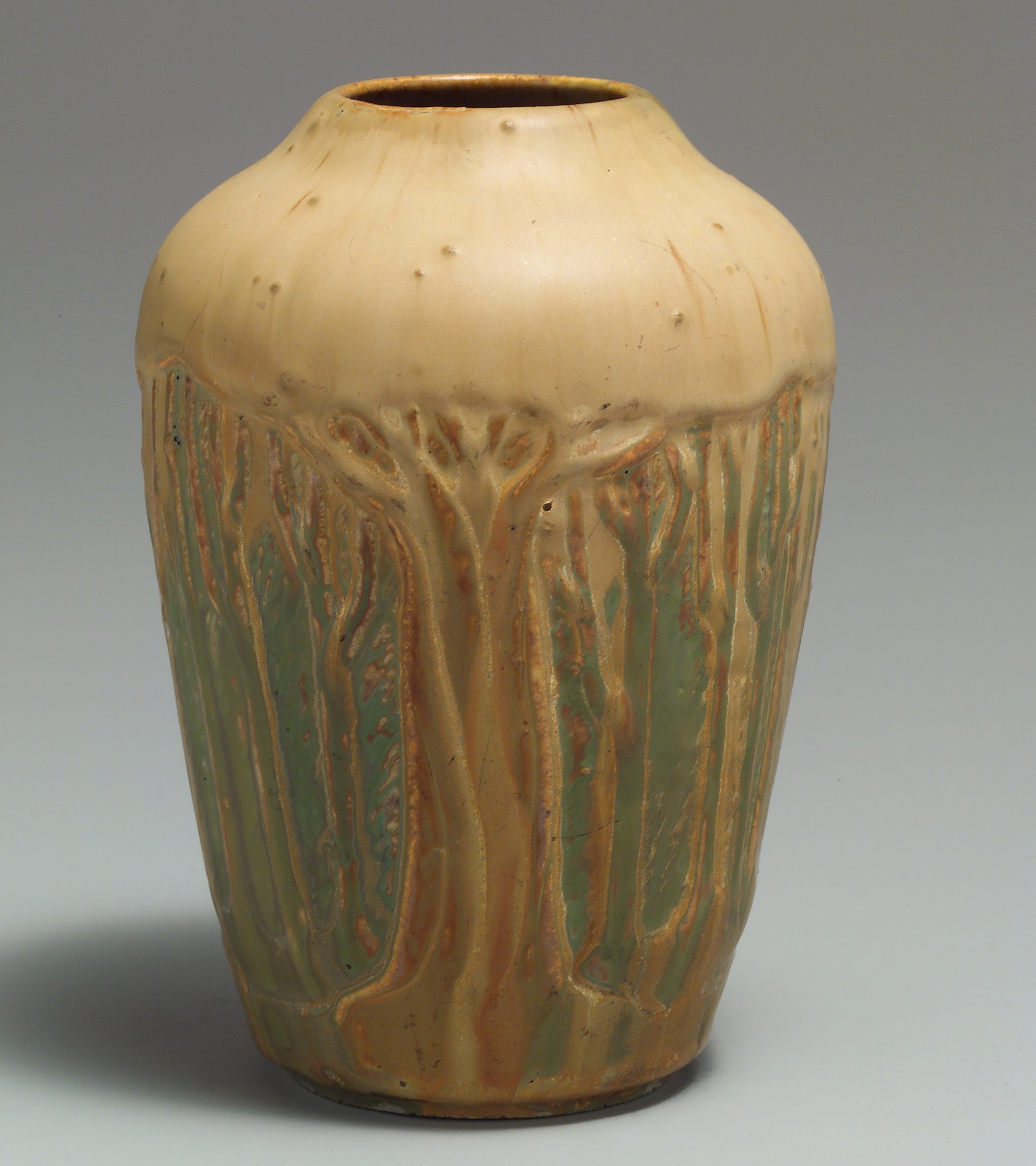
Porcelain vase, c. 1905

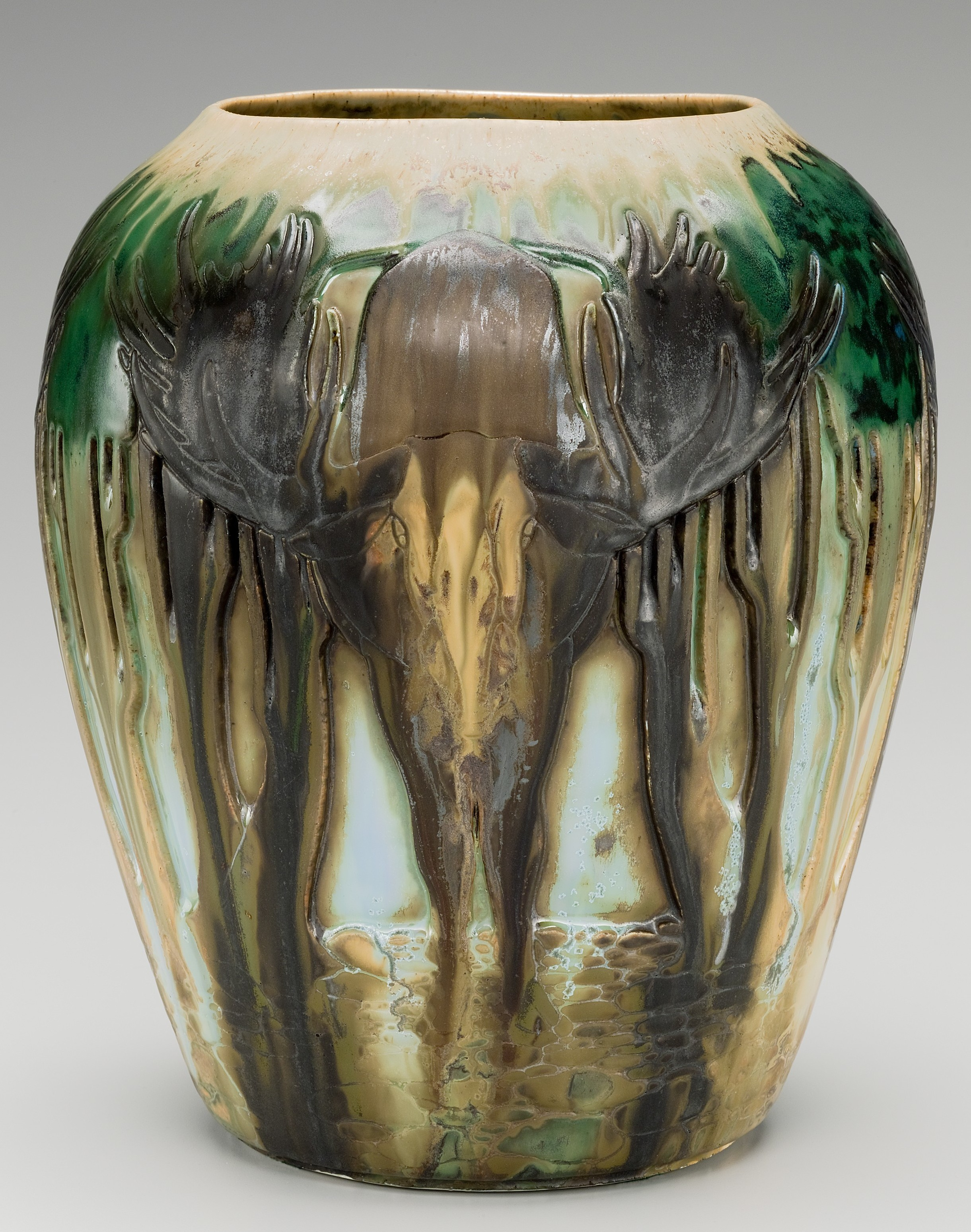
Vase with moose, c. 1907-08

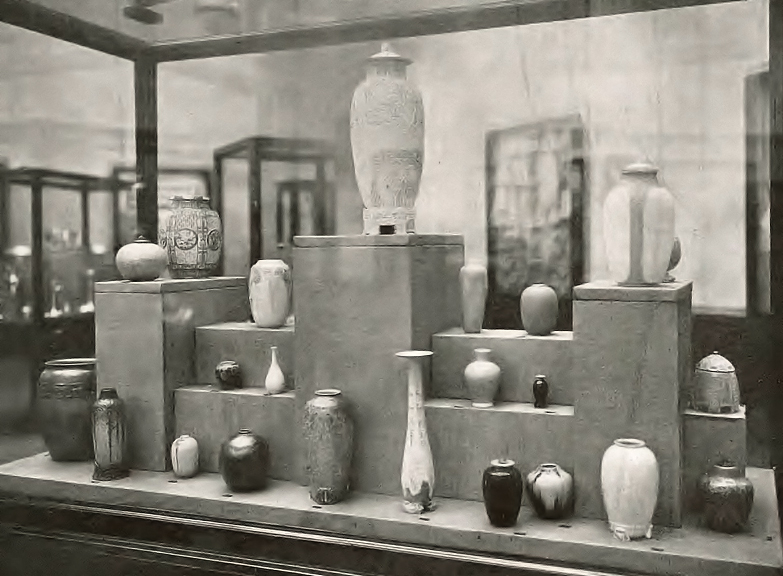
Group of porcelain vases at a 1913 Chicago Art Institute exhibition, with Scarab Vase at top center

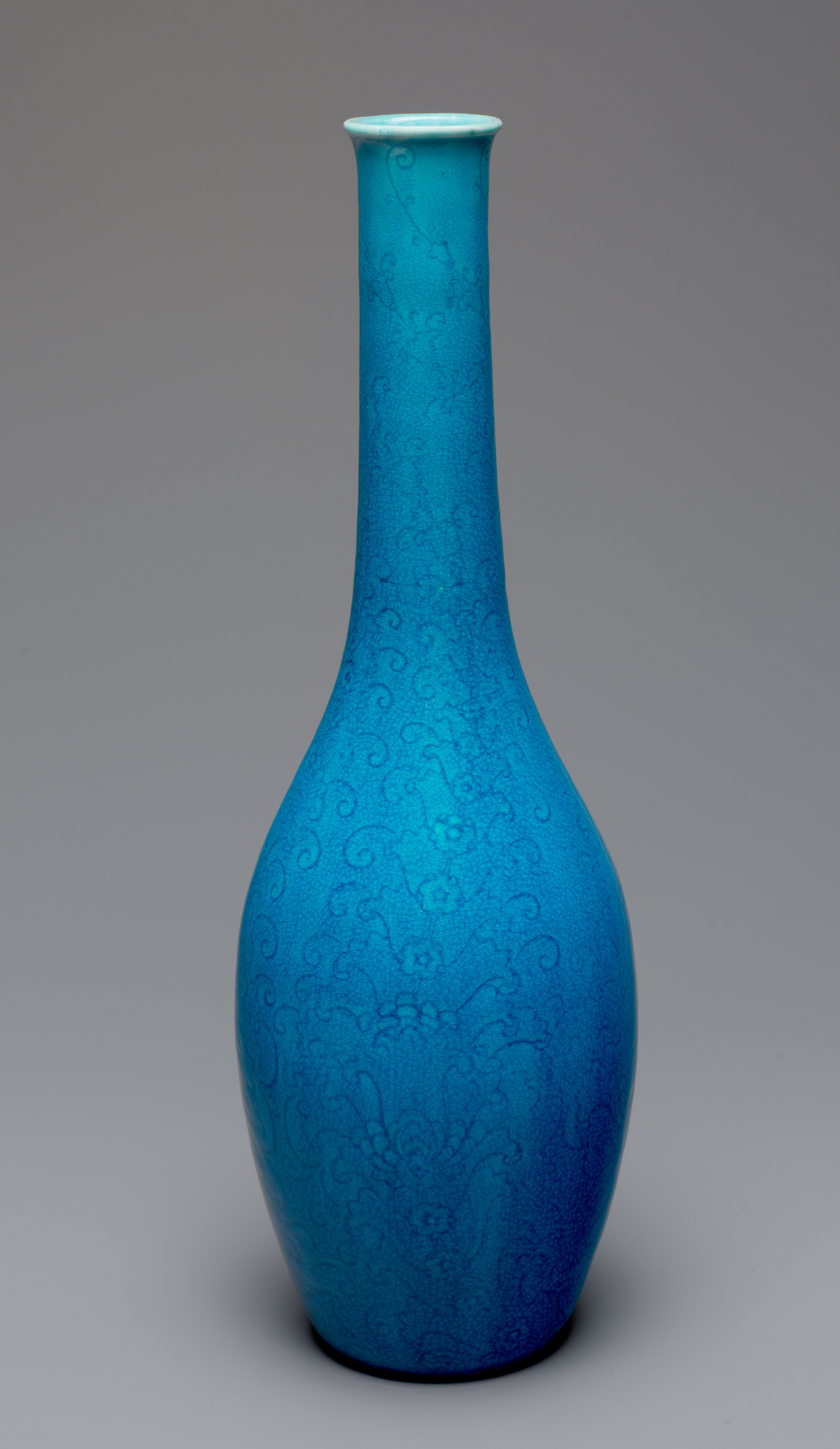
Bottle, 1926

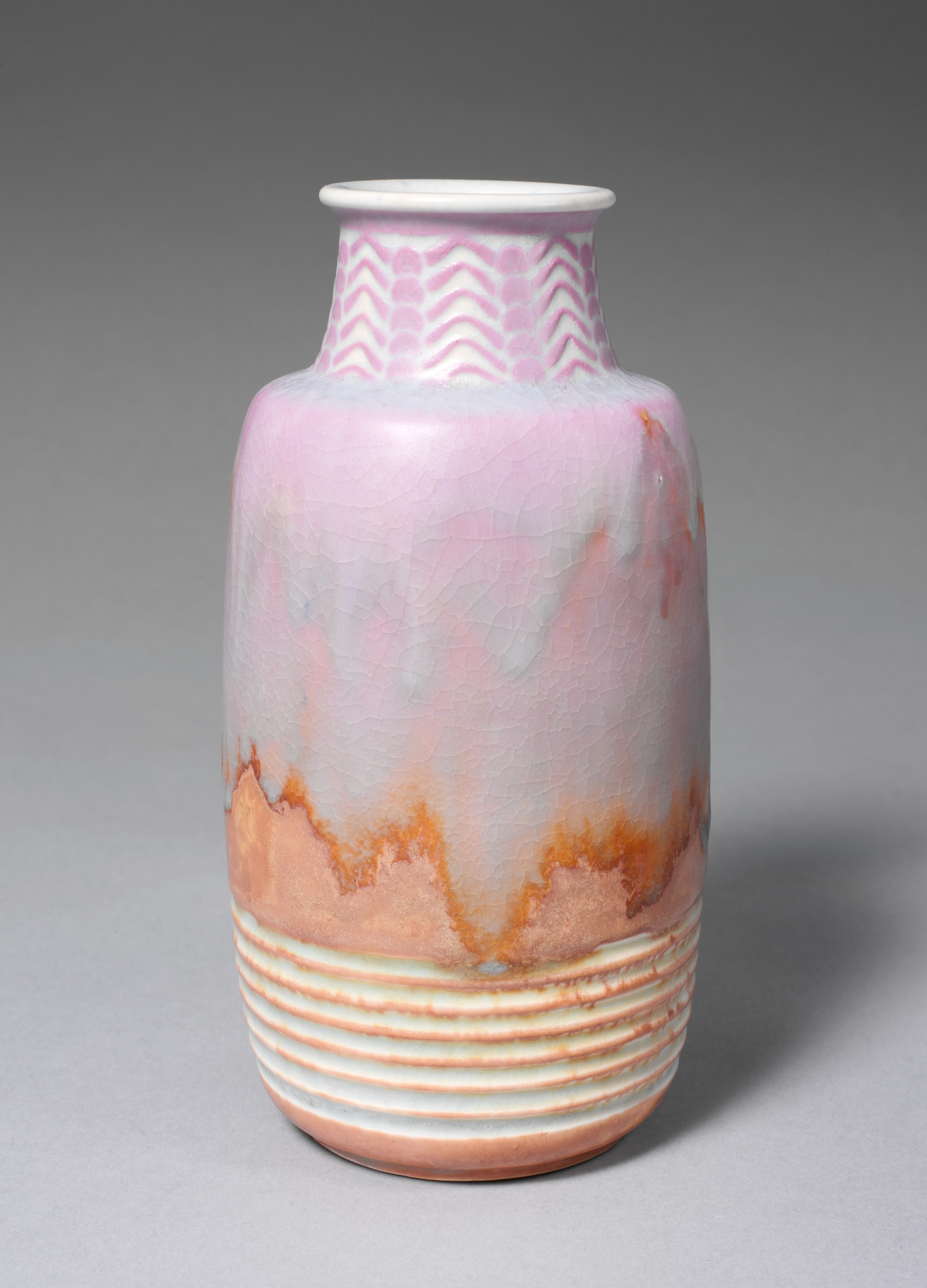
Vase, 1927

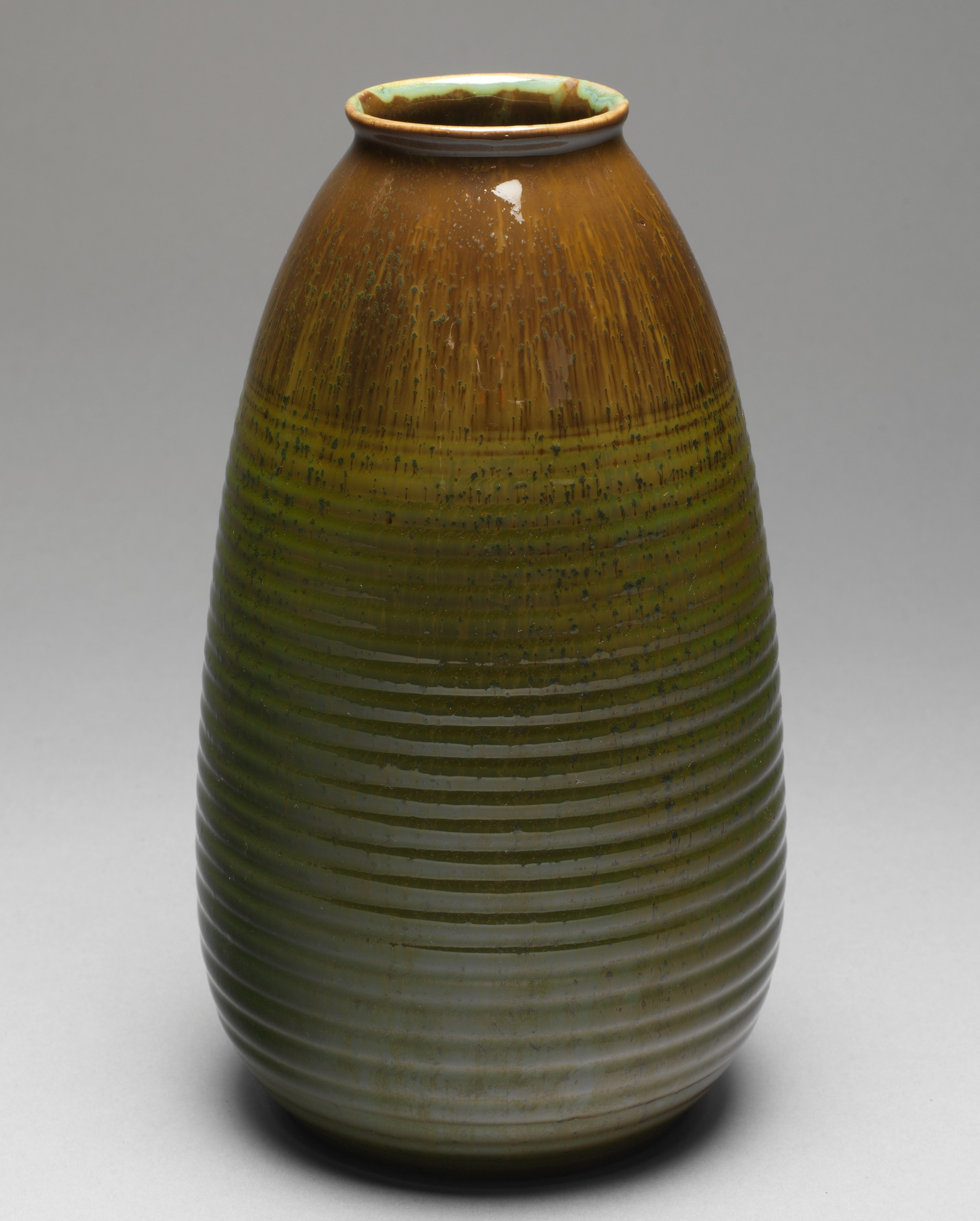
Porcelain vase, 1928
