= Frederick Alfred Rhead =

British potter and illustrator

Frederick Alfred Rhead (1856–1933) was a potter working in North Staffordshire, England. He is not to be confused with his son Frederick Hurten Rhead (1880–1942) who was also a potter, and who worked mainly in the USA. His other children included the pottery designer Charlotte Rhead.

Rhead's father, G.W. Rhead, worked in the pottery industry, and young Frederick was apprenticed at Mintons Ltd. He was one of a number of apprentices who in the 1870s learnt the art of pâte-sur-pâte decoration from Marc-Louis Solon, a French émigré who was the leading exponent of this ceramic technique. Rhead continued to work in pâte-sur-pâte after leaving Minton. He joined Wedgwood and went on to work at a number of potteries including a failed venture of his own. His most famous piece of ceramics is the "Gladstone Vase" which was presented to William Ewart Gladstone by the Liberals of Burslem in 1888. The vase is on public view, having been loaned to the Gladstone Pottery Museum in Longton, Staffordshire.

Besides working in three dimensions as a ceramic designer, Rhead worked in two dimensions as a graphic designer, although in the latter field he was somewhat overshadowed by his brother Louis Rhead who pursued a successful career in the USA. The three brothers Frederick, Louis and George Woolliscroft Rhead Jr collaborated on book illustration projects, for example an edition of The Pilgrim's Progress.

== Bibliography ==
- Bumpus, Bernard Collecting Rhead Pottery: Charlotte, Frederick, Frederick Hurten, 1999

Bernard Bumpus (1921–2004) was the leading authority on the Rhead family. In 1986 Bumpus curated an exhibition at the Geffrye Museum in London. This exhibition, Rhead Artists and Potters, toured several UK museums including the Potteries Museum & Art Gallery in Stoke-on-Trent. Bumpus hoped to take a version of the exhibition to the US, but, despite American interest in the Rhead family, this project foundered.

- Bunyan, John; foreword by Haweis, H.R. Rev. Pilgrim's Progress-from this world to that which is to come, Embellished with over one hundred and twenty designs done by three brothers: George Woolliscroft Rhead, Frederick Rhead, Louis Rhead, publisher The Century Co, New York, 1912.
- Defoe, Daniel, The Life and Strange Adventures of Robinson Crusoe, illustrated by Frederick and Louis Rhead, publisher R. H. Russell, New York, 1900.
- G W and F A Rhead, Staffordshire Pots and Potters, Hutchinson and Co., 1906.
