= Solon and Schemmel Tile Company =

Former tile pottery business in San Jose, California

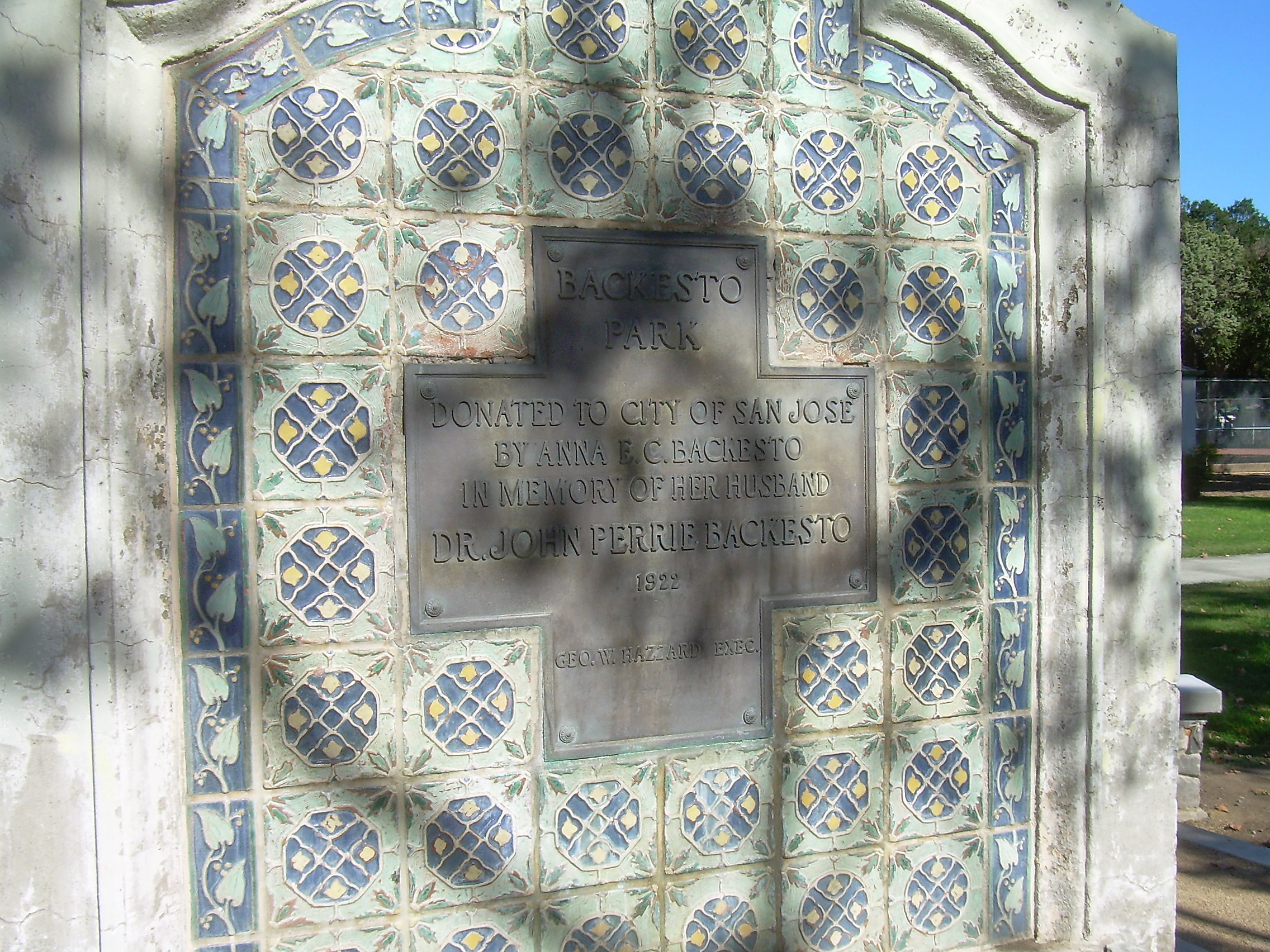
The oldest dated S&S tile installation (1922). Backesto Park Fountain in San Jose, California.

Solon and Schemmel Tile Company (S&S) was a tile pottery business in San Jose, California from 1920 – 1936. The company's tiles adorn Steinhart Aquarium in San Francisco and the Hearst Castle in San Simeon, California. Other projects included tiles for the Orpheum and Junior Orpheum theaters in Los Angeles, the Mark Hopkins Hotel, Central Classroom Building at San Jose State University, Y.M.C.A. buildings in San Diego and Honolulu, the Dollar Steamship Line building at Portland, Oregon, the Oakland and Berkeley war memorials. and the Frank P. Williams House in Sacramento. Their tiles were used by Helen Bell Bruton and her sister Margaret Bruton to create the Fleishhacker Zoo (currently San Francisco Zoo) Mother's House mosaics. The business was eventually subsumed into Stonelight Tile and is one of the only major California tile manufacturers from the 1920s to have survived to the present.

== History ==
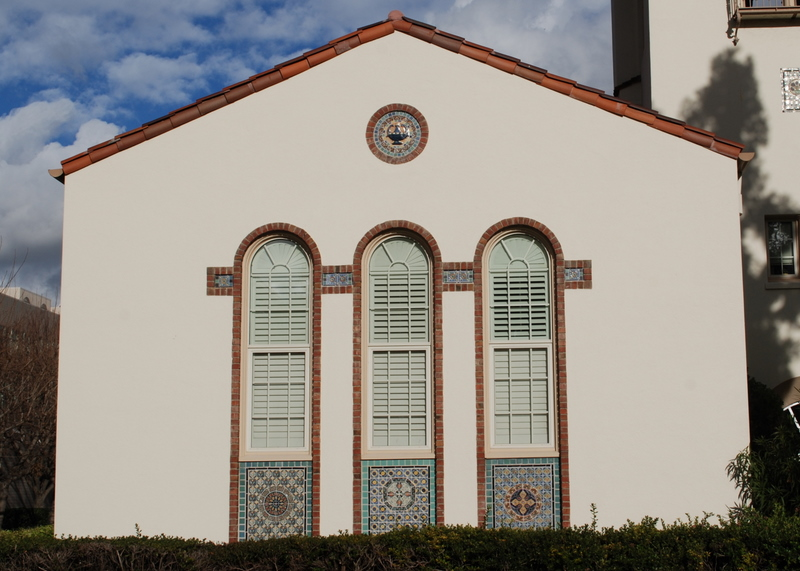
Tile work on the Central Classroom building at Albert Solon's Alma Mater, San Jose State University

Albert Solon (1887–1949) immigrated from England to the U.S. in 1912. He studied at San Jose Normal School (later San Jose State University). He was employed as the pottery director at Arequipa Sanatorium in Fairfax, a ceramic therapy program for tuberculosis patients, before moving to San Jose and teaching ceramics at the San Jose Normal School.

In 1920, he joined with Schemmel to found S&S tiles Solon designed the tiles and Schemmel headed the business. Both men lived in Willow Glen during the 1930s and 40s. Their work for Willow Glen sites included Willow Glen Theater (demolished)) and the façades of homes on Telfer Avenue, Kotenberg Avenue and Willow Glen Way.

Schemmel retired in 1936 and Solon joined up with Paul Larkin. They changed the company name to Solon & Larkin and worked together until Solon retired in 1947. Schemmel died in 1950. Four friends from UC-Berkeley took over the company in 1953 and changed the name from the Larkin Tile Company to Stonelight Tile. They owned the company until 1979. It was bought by David Anson.

== Solon's family ==
Albert Solon came from a family with a long history in ceramics. He was the grandson of Léon Arnoux, art director of Mintons Limited, and son of Marc-Louis-Emmanuel Solon, a French porcelain artist who became well known for his pâte-sur-pâte technique during his tenure at Mintons in Stoke-on-Trent, England. Albert's eldest brother, Leon Solon (1872–1957), worked as artistic director and designer at the American Encaustic Tiling Company in New York from 1912 to 1925, where Paul Solon (1883-?) also worked. Camille A. Solon (1877–1960), a muralist and ceramist, worked with architect Julia Morgan doing painting and tile work for the private libraries and indoor pools of William Randolph Hearst's mansions and estates in San Simeon. Gilbert Solon (1879–1929) worked at the Royal Worcester Porcelain Co. Ltd. in Worcester, England.

== See also ==
- California pottery
