= Camille Solon =

British muralist and ceramist

Camille Antoine Arnoux Solon (1877–1960) was a British muralist and ceramist of French descent. He worked in the United Kingdom before emigrating in his 30s to the United States, where he worked with architect Julia Morgan, painting murals and designing tile work for Hearst Castle, William Randolph Hearst's estate at San Simeon, California.

== Early life ==
Camille A. Solon was born on 27 March 1877 in Stoke-on-Trent, Staffordshire, the centre of England's pottery industry. He was one of nine children born to Marie Antoinette Laure Arnoux and Louis Marc Solon.

His mother was the daughter of Léon Arnoux, art director of Mintons Limited. The Arnoux family had been well established in the European pottery and ceramic industry for over 300 years, dating back to Toulouse in the late seventeenth century. His father had trained at Sèvres and joined Mintons in 1870 at the time of the Franco-Prussian War. He became the preeminent master of the pâte-sur-pâte technique of porcelain decoration.

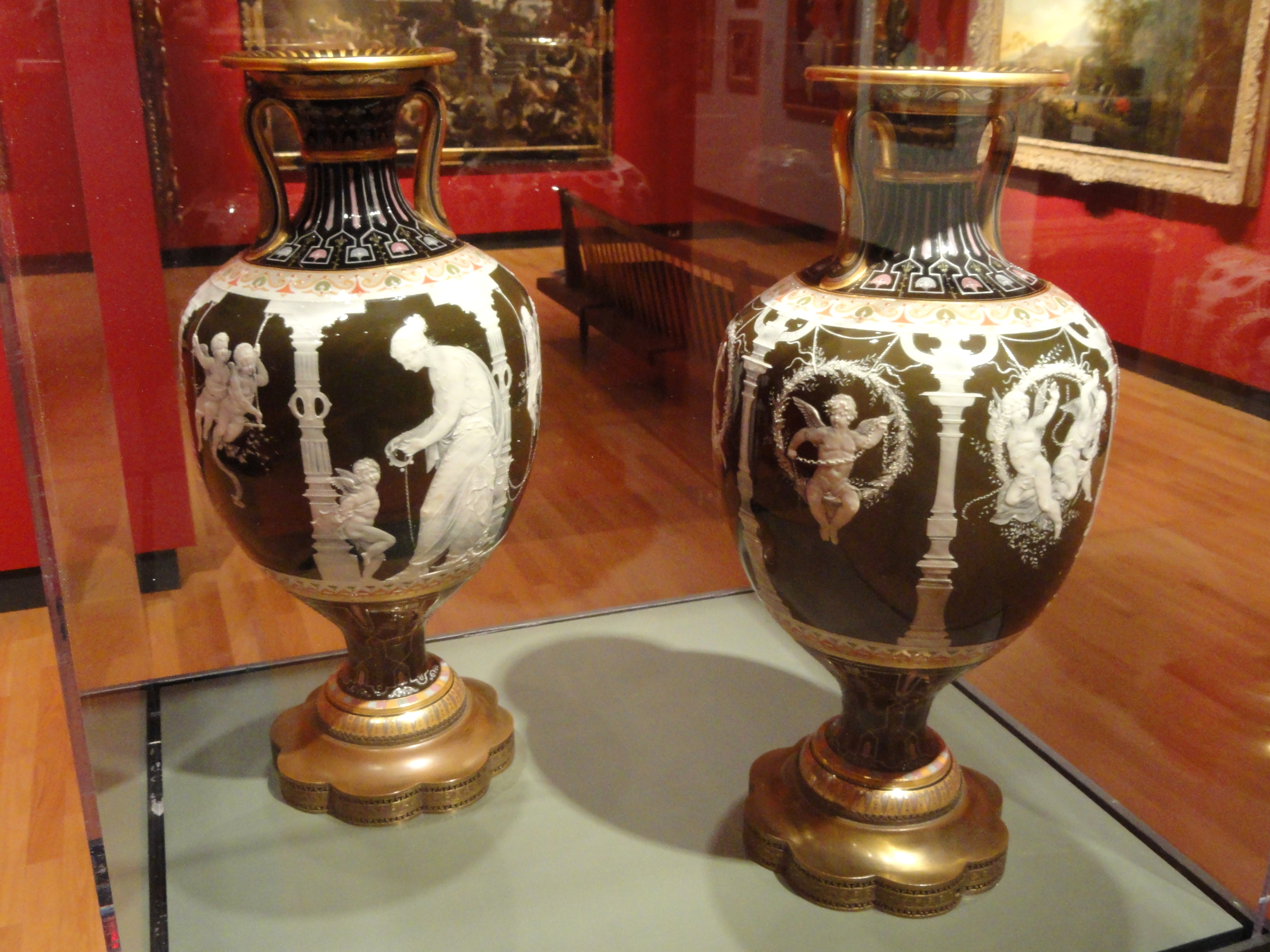
Minton vases designed by Camille Solon's father in the pâte-sur-pâte style, 1880, on display at Mount Holyoke College Art Museum

Several of Solon's siblings had artistic careers including the eldest Léon-Victor Solon. In 1887, at the age of ten, Solon enrolled at Cotton College, a Roman Catholic boarding school in a rural part of Staffordshire. He stayed there till 1892. He received tuition in art from his father and later studied at the Slade School, University College London.

== Career ==
=== United Kingdom ===
In the years leading up to World War I, Solon lived near Stoke-on-Trent in the village of Draycott in the Moors. The village had a railway station on the Stoke to Derby line and a small Catholic community.

Solon is listed as a resident of the village in the 1901 census. His occupation is given as "faience draughtsman". He was still living in the same parish at the time of the 1911 census, but at a different address, "The Studio", near the railway station. His occupation had also changed to "landscape painter".

=== United States ===
By 1913 when his father died, Camille Solon had brothers working in the United States. In 1914 Camille emigrated to California and joined his younger brother Albert, who was the pottery director at Arequipa Sanatorium near Fairfax. The sanatorium offered a ceramic therapy program for patients recovering from tuberculosis. Albert Solon later founded Solon and Schemmel Tile Company and Camille Solon likely worked at his brother's company early on.

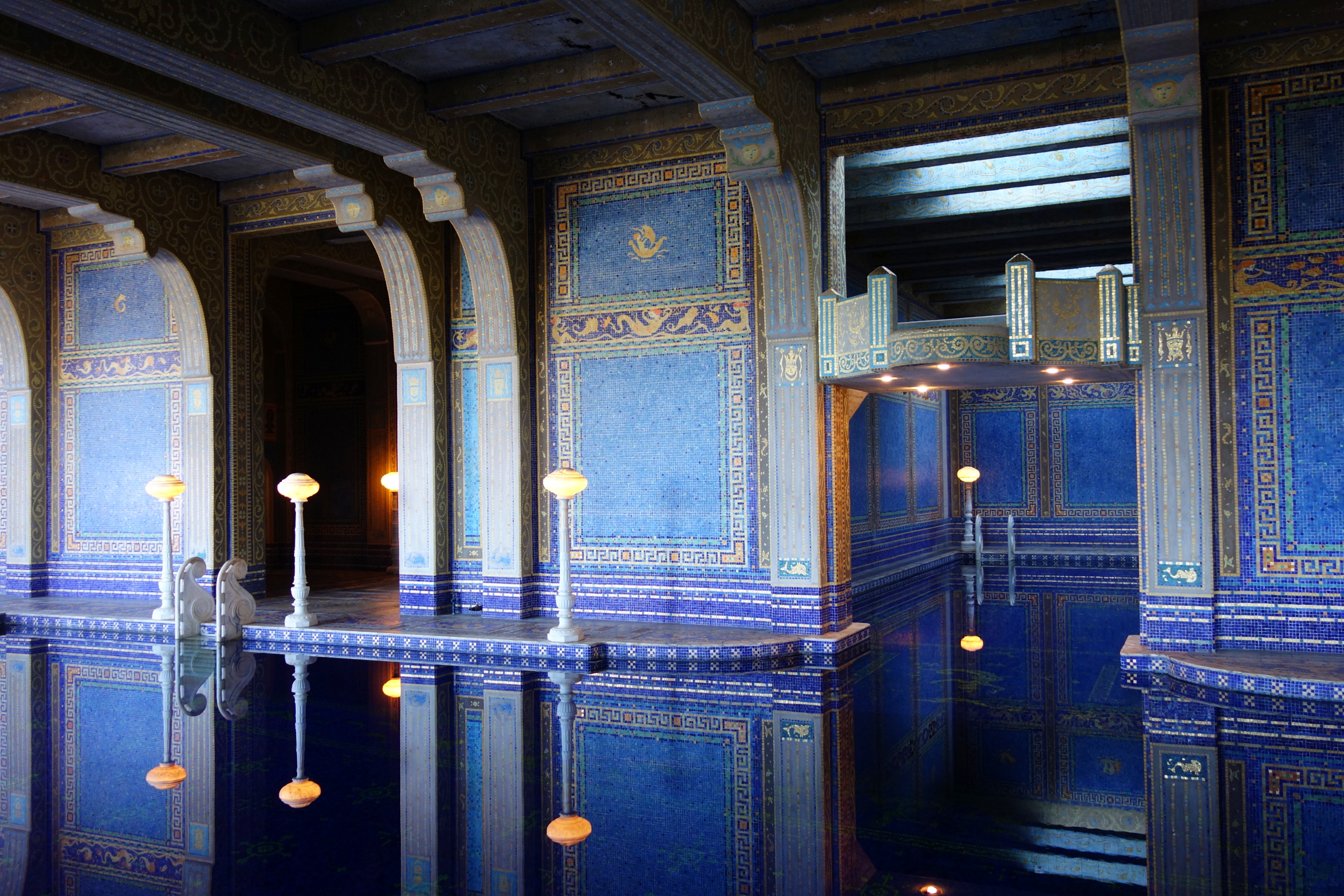
Roman Pool (Hearst Castle)

Albert's company, now known as Stonelight Tile, is one of only three major California tile manufacturers from the 1920s to have survived to the present.

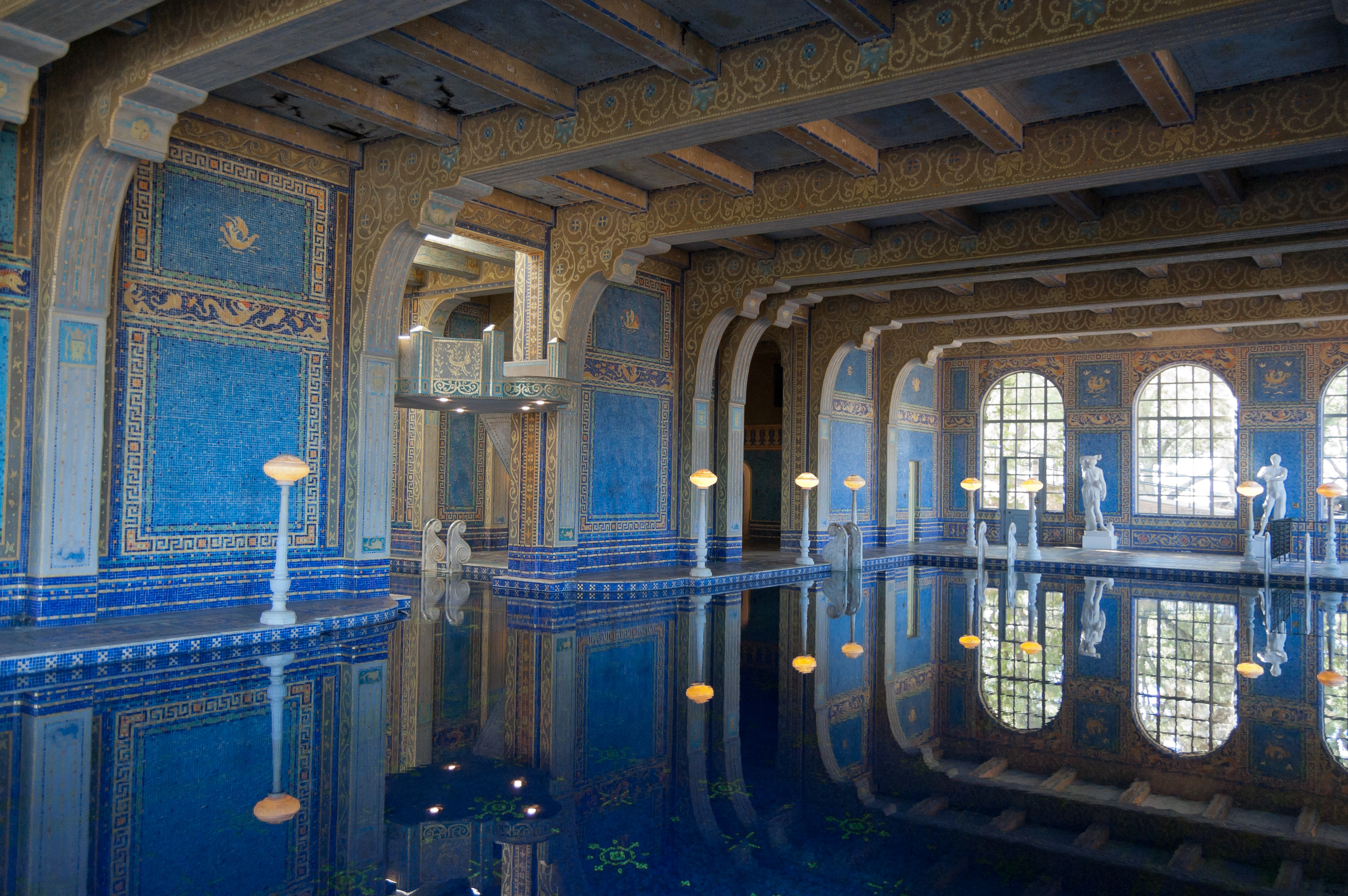
Hearst Castle Roman Pool

From 1925-1940 Solon was a designer and art director for William Randolph Hearst at San Simeon. Solon designed the glass tile mosaics, used in the indoor Roman Pool at Hearst Castle. The mosaics that cover the walls, ceiling, and pool are made up of one-inch square smalti tiles (glass and fused gold). The inspiration for the designs came from the 5th Century Mausoleum of Galla Placidia where the mosaics are likewise made from glass tesserae. Solon also designed and painted the murals in the Gothic Suite of Casa Grande's private 3rd floor.

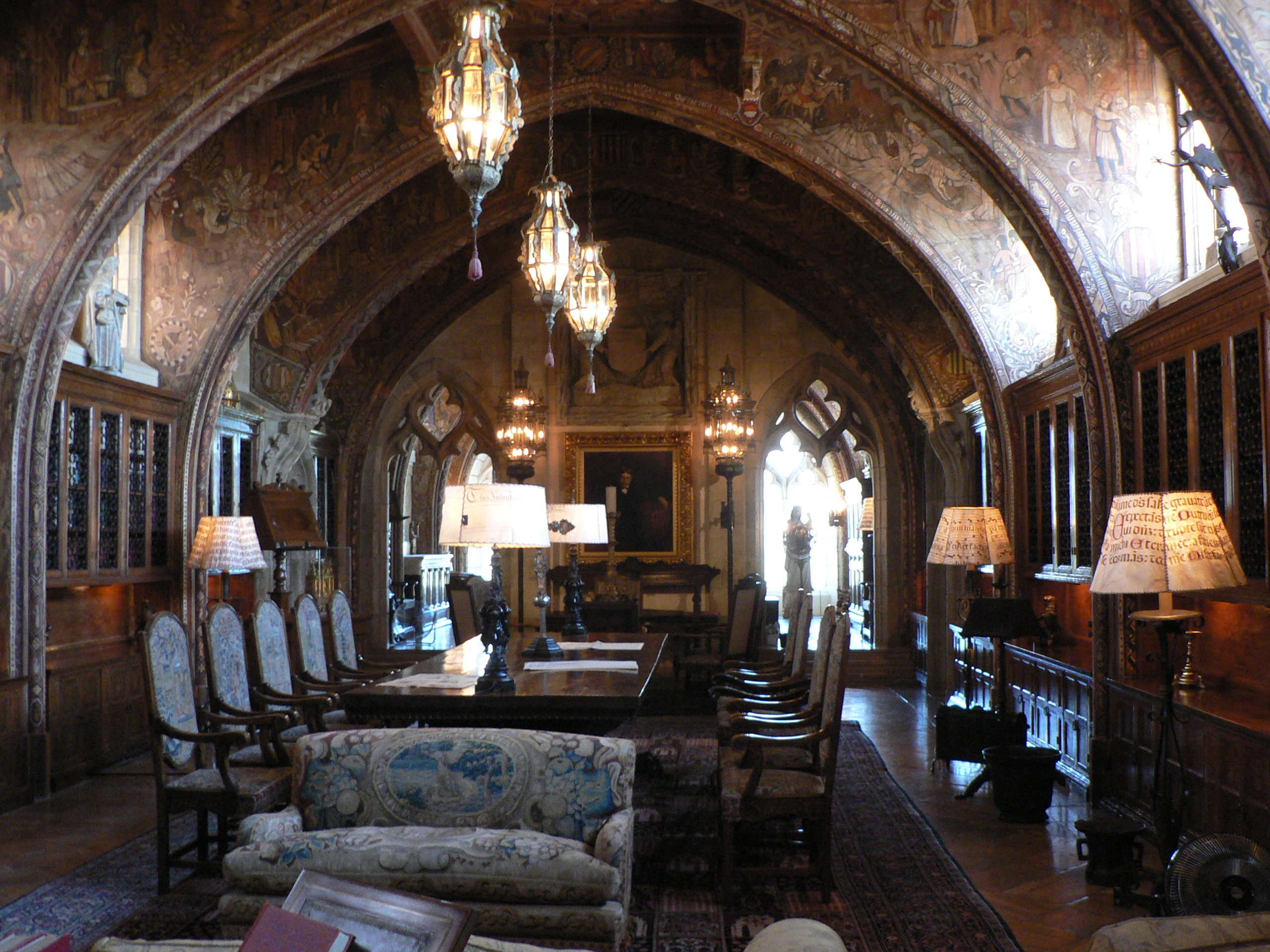
Hearst Castle's Gothic Suite designed and painted by Camille Solon

In the 1940s, he worked with Julia Morgan to design murals and decorative details for the Chapel of the Chimes crematorium in Oakland. He also designed, “The Creation,” an interior mural in the Temple of Religion and Tower of Peace building at the 1939 Golden Gate International Exposition in San Francisco.

== Personal life ==
In 1920, Solon married Sylvia Wallace, a fellow British immigrant. Prior to moving to California and marrying Solon, she had taught at Draycott in the Moors, where she appears on the 1911 census.

As he aged, Solon suffered from failing eyesight and used a beloved German Shepherd guide dog to aid him. Solon died in Marin County on 8 January 1960 and was buried at Mount Olivet Catholic Cemetery in San Rafael.

== Legacy ==
A couple of his landscapes are held by the Potteries Museum & Art Gallery in Stoke-on-Trent. California Polytechnic State University has sketches including Welsh and English landscapes as well as Californian ones.
