= Léon-Victor Solon =

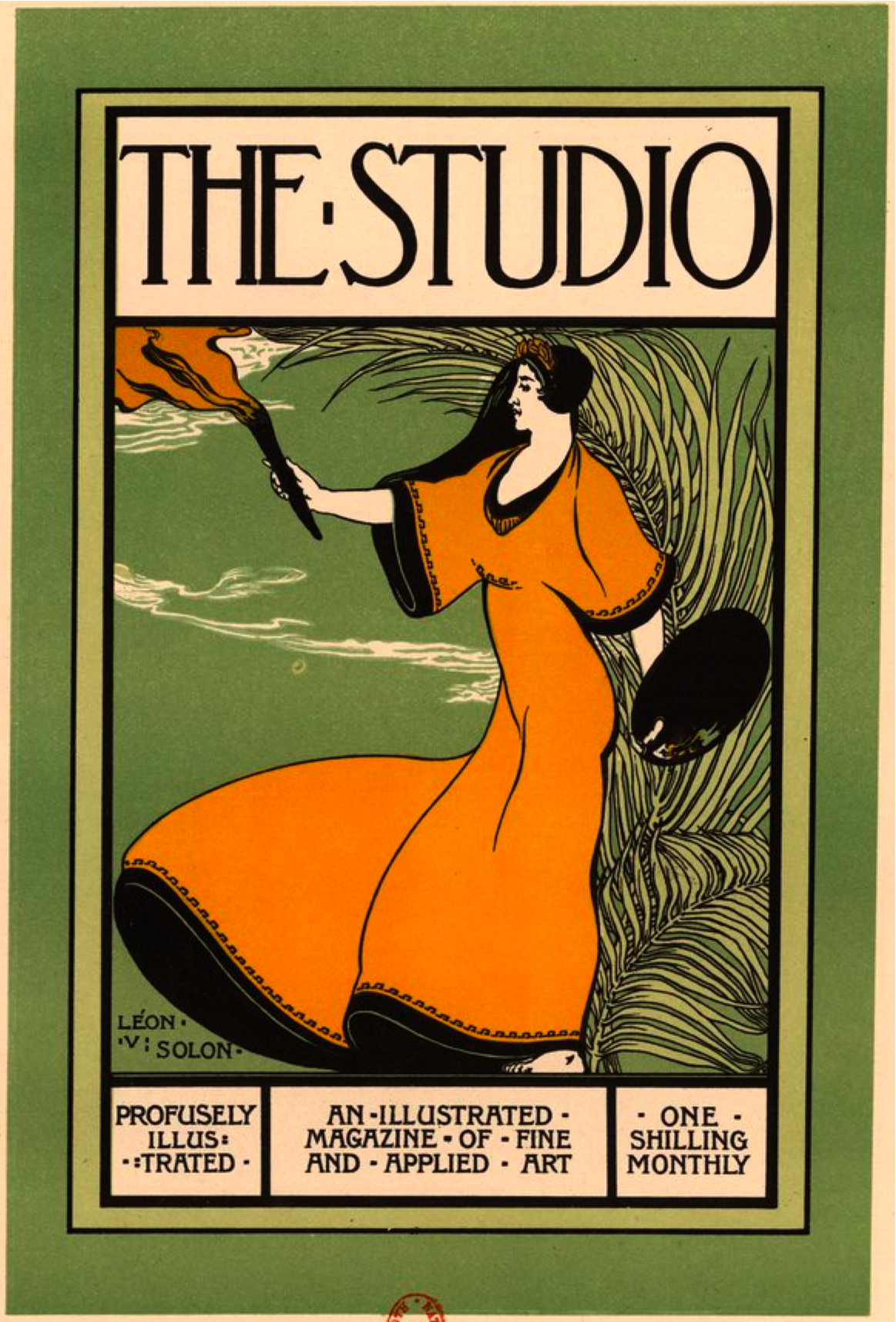
Poster by Léon-Victor Solon advertising The Studio magazine.

Léon-Victor Solon (17 April 1873 – 27 December 1957), son of ceramist Marc-Louis Solon, was an English painter, ceramist, and graphic artist. He was a purveyor of the Art Nouveau and Art Deco styles and an important Modern Style (British Art Nouveau style) figure.

== Personal life ==
Solon was the eldest son of Marc-Louis Solon, employee of the factory Mintons in Stoke-on-Trent, and Laure Arnoux, daughter of the artistic director there, Léon Arnoux. He was the brother of fellow artists Camille Solon and Albert Solon of Solon and Schemmel Tile Company.

His grave is located in Lakeland, Florida.

== Career ==
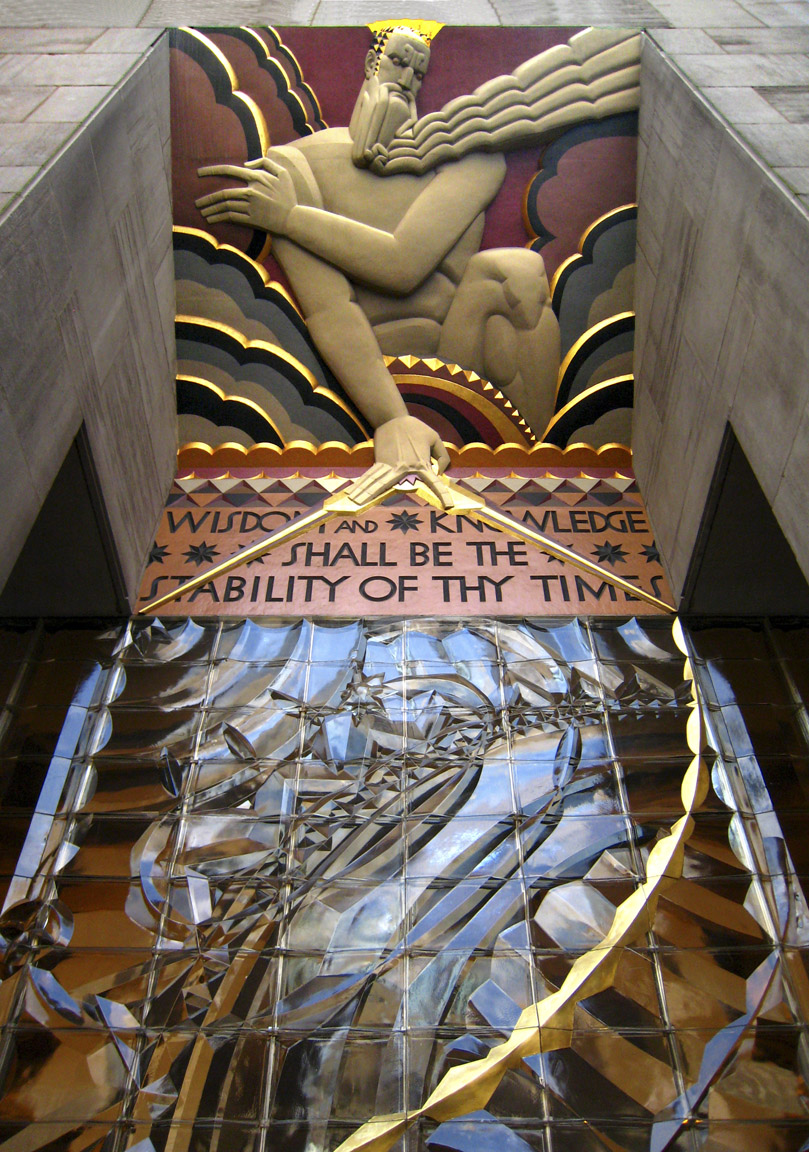
Wisdom at 30 Rockefeller Plaza. Verse from Isaiah 33:6. Sculptor Lee Lawrie and Colorist Leon V. Solon

Solon was artistic director of Mintons between 1900 and 1909, and made an important contribution to the development of Art Nouveau in the Minton ceramic collections. In 1901, he was joined by John William Wadsworth (1879–1955) and both incorporated motifs borrowed from the Viennese secessionist movement. He specialized in tube-lined vases and plaques marketed as "secessionist ware".

While based in Staffordshire, he worked not only in ceramics, but also in other local industries: he produced textile designs for the Wardle family of silk dyers and printers based in Leek (Thomas Wardle & Co. and Bernard Wardle & Co.); he also designed doublures for bookbinder G.T. Bagguley, of Newcastle-under-Lyme, who patented the Sutherland binding technique in 1895.

Solon emigrated to the United States in 1909 and in 1912 he became the artistic director of the American Encaustic Tiling Company based in Zanesville (Ohio), and specialized in the production of tile with slip decoration.

Leon V. Solon designed the color scheme for Rockefeller Center and was responsible for the polychroming of the famous sculptural decorations on the exterior of Rockefeller Center. Solon first colored Lee Lawrie's Wisdom, Sound, and Light sculpture at the entrance of 30 Rockefeller Plaza and due to the quality of his work he was then hired to be the colorist for the entire public art project at Rockefeller Center.

He is also one of the artists associated with the creation of the pediment of the Philadelphia Museum of Art. In describing his polychrome work on the pediment, Solon stated, “Greek principle [of coloring] was absolutely adhered to; this consists in restricting color to decorative features and developing color elaboration in inverse relation to structural significance. ...the main aim was to produce a distinctive color quality upon each member or feature, to prevent unrelated items associating in effect through similarity of coloring.”

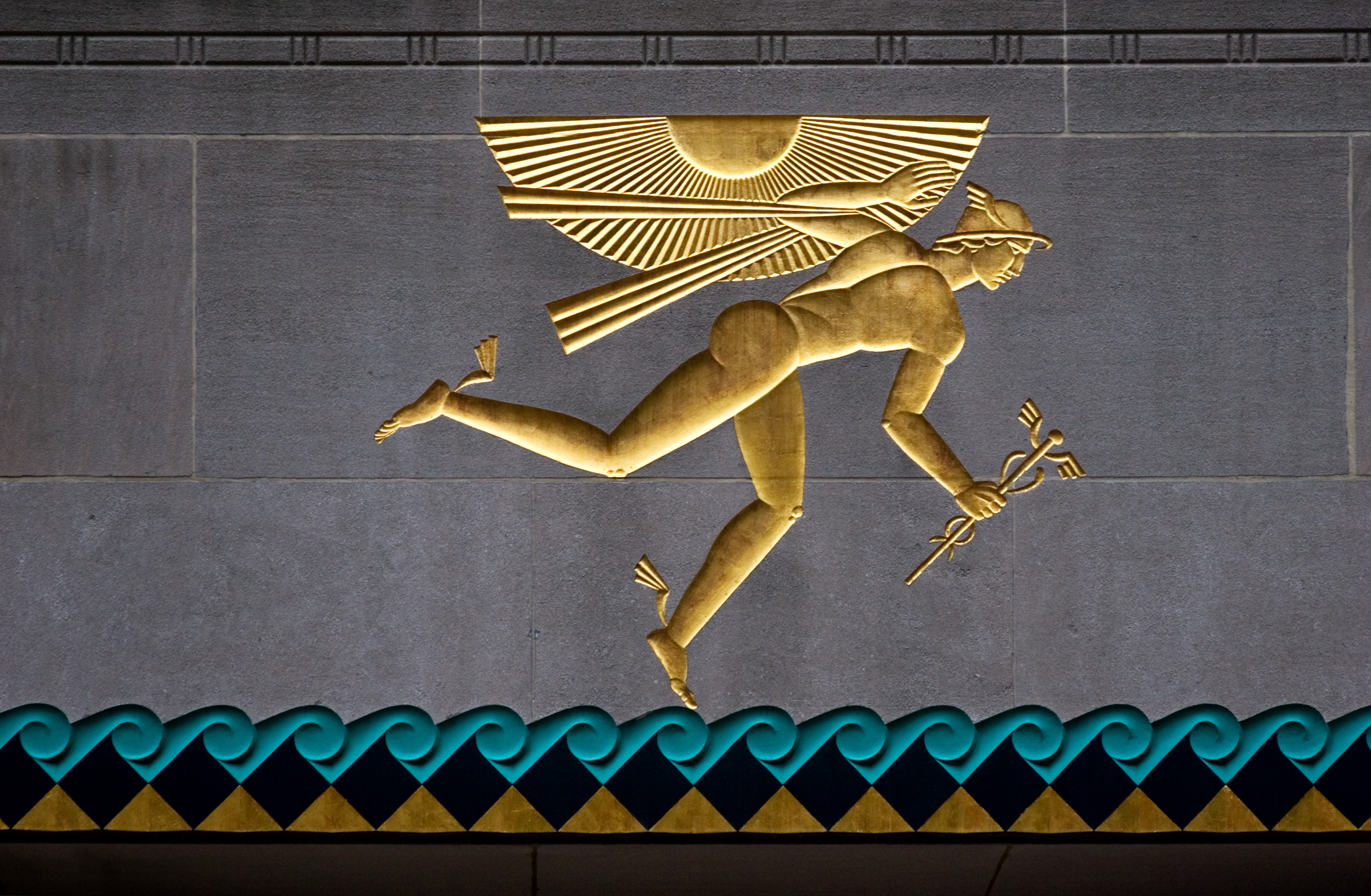
"Winged Mercury" - Rockefeller center

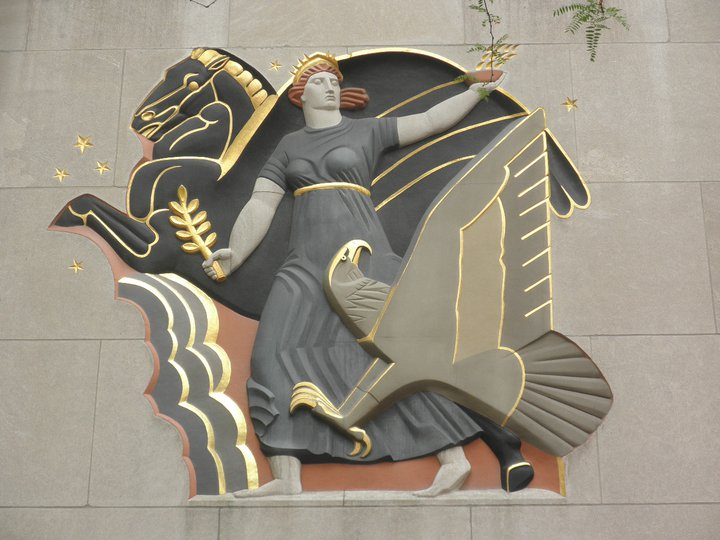
"Progress" - Rockefeller Center

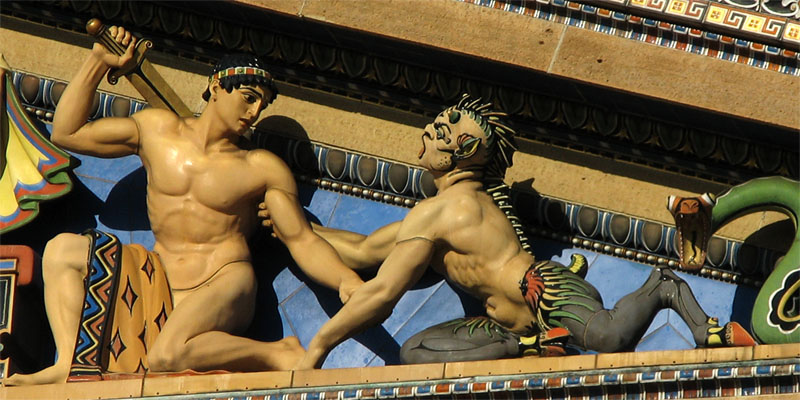
Pediment detail - Philadelphia Museum of Art

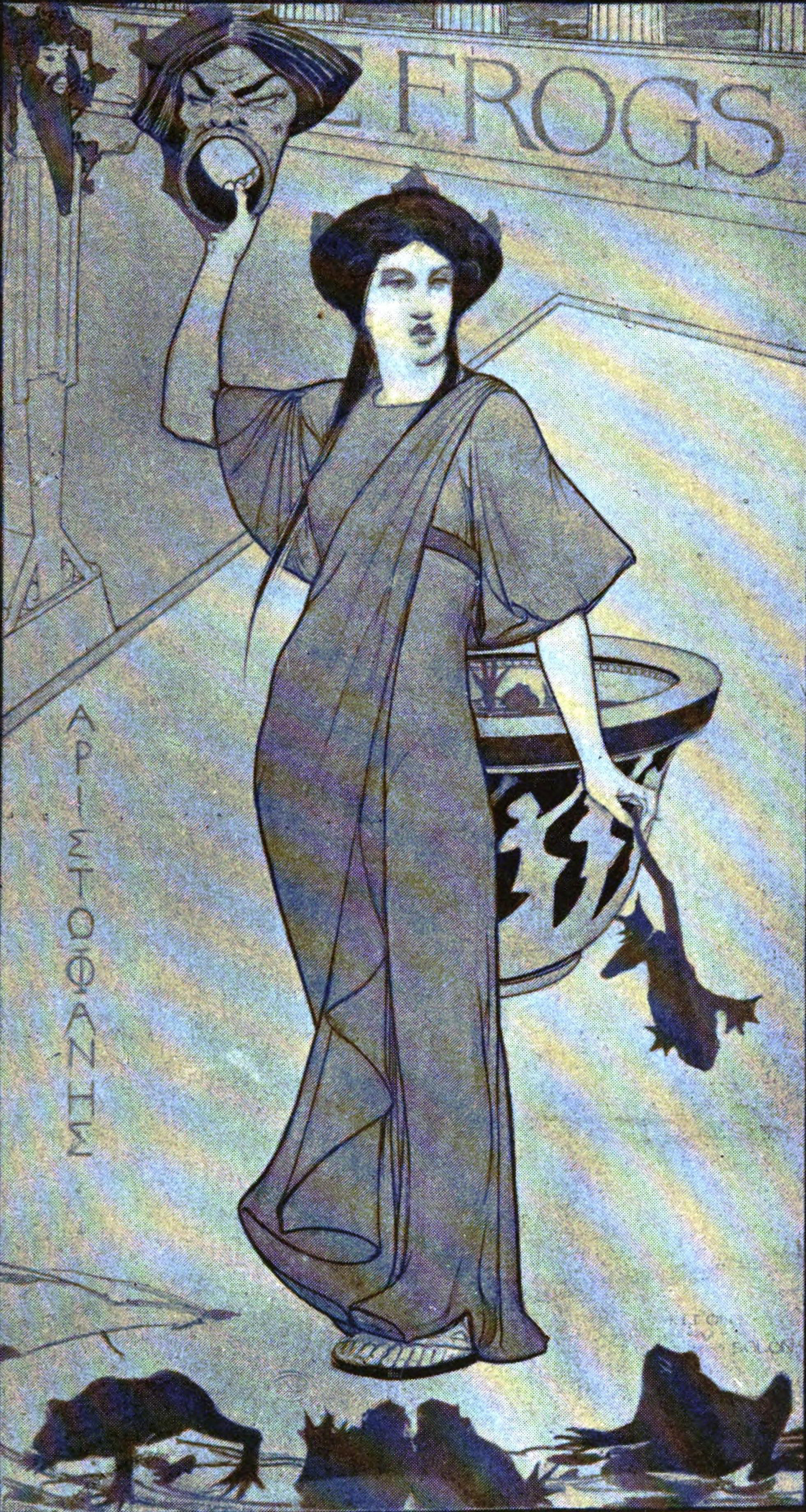
Poster by Leon Solon

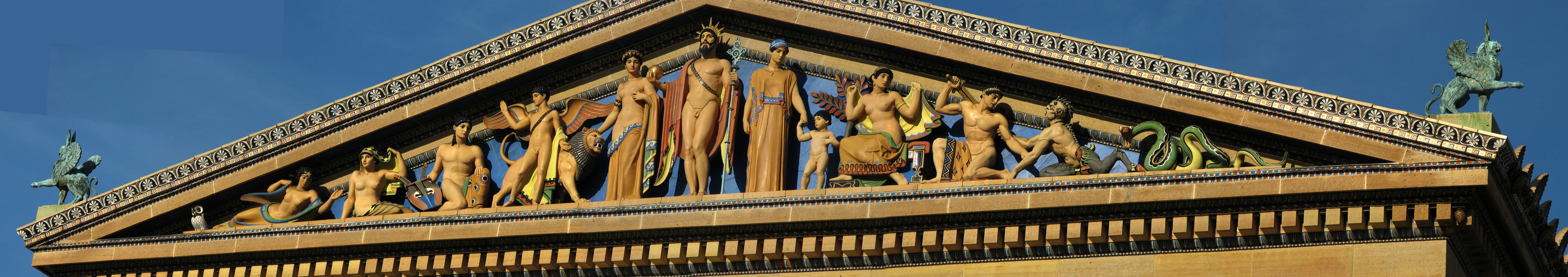
Western Civilization pediment, Philadelphia Museum of Art, C. Paul Jennewein, sculptor, Leon V. Solon, colorist

== Selected publications ==
- Polychromy: Architectural and Structural, Theory and Practice. The Architectural Record, New York, 1924.
