= Marc-Louis Solon =

French porcelain artist (1835–1913)

Marc-Louis E. Solon
- Born: 1835; Montauban, France
- Died: 23 June 1913 (aged 78); Stoke-on-Trent, England
- Occupation: Porcelain artist
- Known for: Pâte-sur-pâte

Marc-Louis-Emmanuel Solon (1835 – 23 June 1913), pseudonym Miles, was a French porcelain artist. After beginning his career at the Sèvres Pottery, he moved to Stoke-on-Trent in 1870 to work at Mintons Ltd, where he became the leading exponent of the technique of ceramic decoration called pâte-sur-pâte. His work commanded high prices in the late Victorian period.

Solon was born in Montauban, Tarn-et-Garonne. After moving to England at the time of the Franco-Prussian War he lived there for the rest of his life.

== Family ==
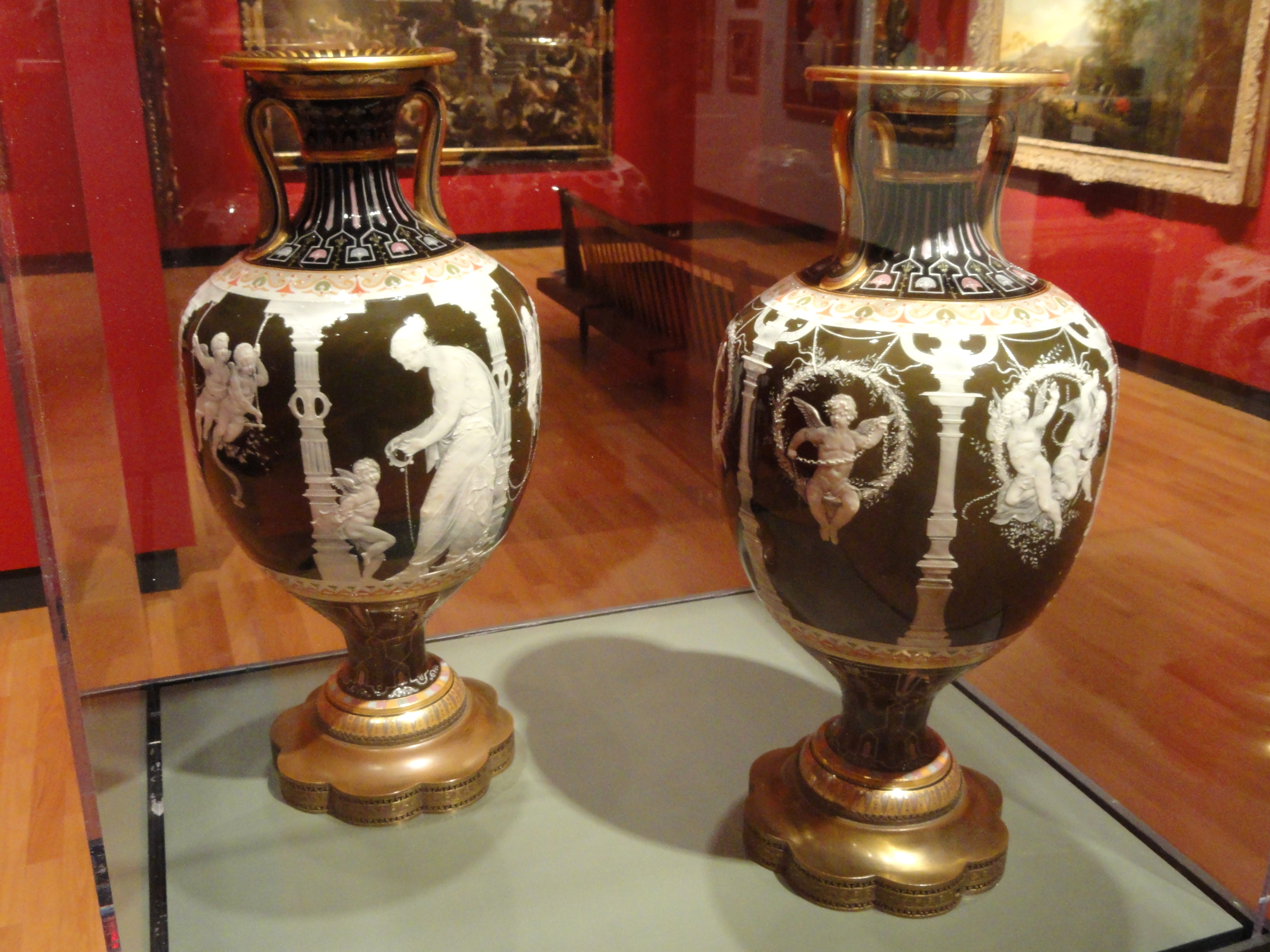
Mintons vases designed by Marc-Louis-Emmanuel Solon in the pâte-sur-pâte style, 1880

Solon married Laure, the daughter of Minton's art director, Léon Arnoux, and the Solons raised a large family in The Villas near the Mintons factory. Their eldest son, Léon-Victor Solon (1872–1957), joined Minton in the 1890s and became art director (1900–1909). Leon made an important contribution to Art Nouveau ceramics at Minton before moving to the United States. Other notable sons include Camille Solon and Albert Solon of Solon and Schemmel Tile Company.

== Art ==
Despite some family resistance to his becoming an artist, he studied at the École des Beaux-Arts and with Horace Lecoq de Boisbaudran. Some of Solon's work came to the attention of the art director of the Sèvres Pottery. Solon was employed at Sèvres from 1862–70 as a ceramic artist and designer and was where he learned and began to perfect the technique of pâte-sur-pâte. His styles were derived from Classical Greece, the Renaissance, 17th- and 18th-century paintings, and Victorian postcards while his subjects often included portraits, female figures, putti (cherubs), small animals, and birds. His early work was produced under the pseudonym Miles, said to be based on his initials M L E S. A number of these earlier pieces are housed in the Victoria and Albert Museum and in the collection of the former Minton Museum.

Solon moved from France to England in 1870 to flee from the Franco-Prussian War. He found employment at Mintons Ltd, and settled at Nº1, The Villas, Stoke-on-Trent. Mintons had a history of employing foreign artists, starting with their first Frenchman in 1848, the art director Léon Arnoux, followed by other French artists such as the sculptor Albert-Ernest Carrier-Belleuse. While working at Mintons Solon became the leading expert in the pâte-sur-pâte technique. Mintons experienced more demand for pâte-sur-pâte ceramics than Solon could fulfill on his own so he trained a number of apprentices including Frederick Alfred Rhead and Alboin Birks. There ensued a golden age of pâte-sur-pâte in Stoke-on-Trent that stretched into the early years of the 20th century.

One of Solon's vases, believed to be his largest, is on display at Osborne House.

He died at Stoke-on-Trent on 23 June 1913.

== Gallery ==
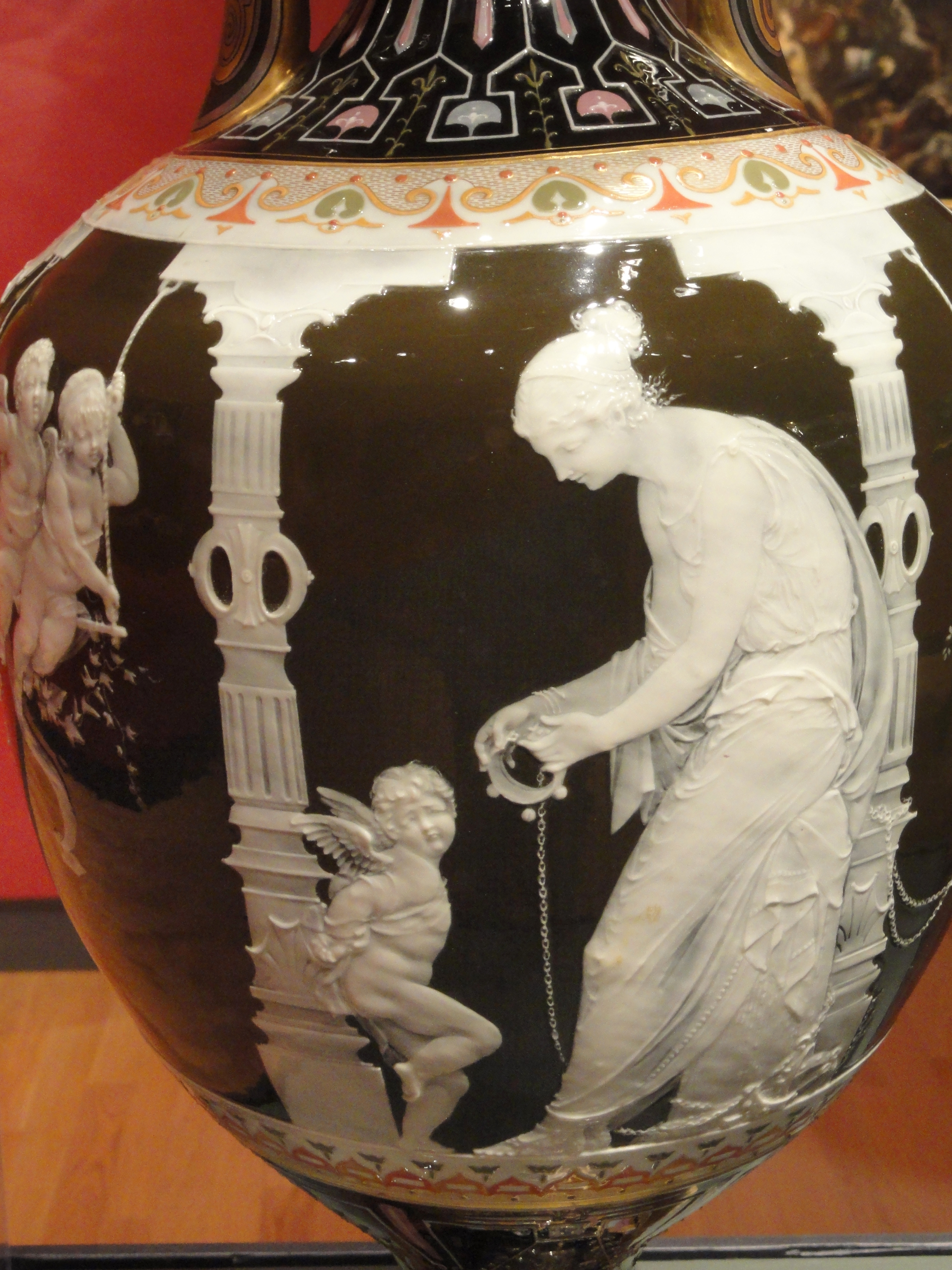
Marc-Louis-Emmanuel Solon at Mount Holyoke College Art Museum

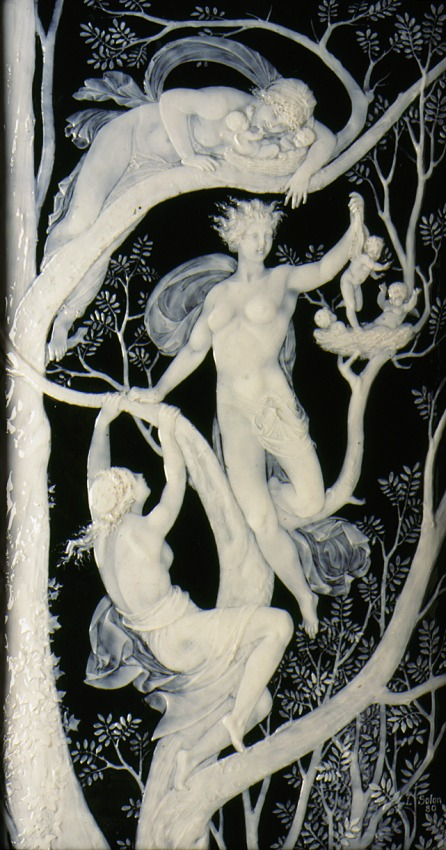
Plaque with Tree Spirits, 1880, at Los Angeles County Museum of Art

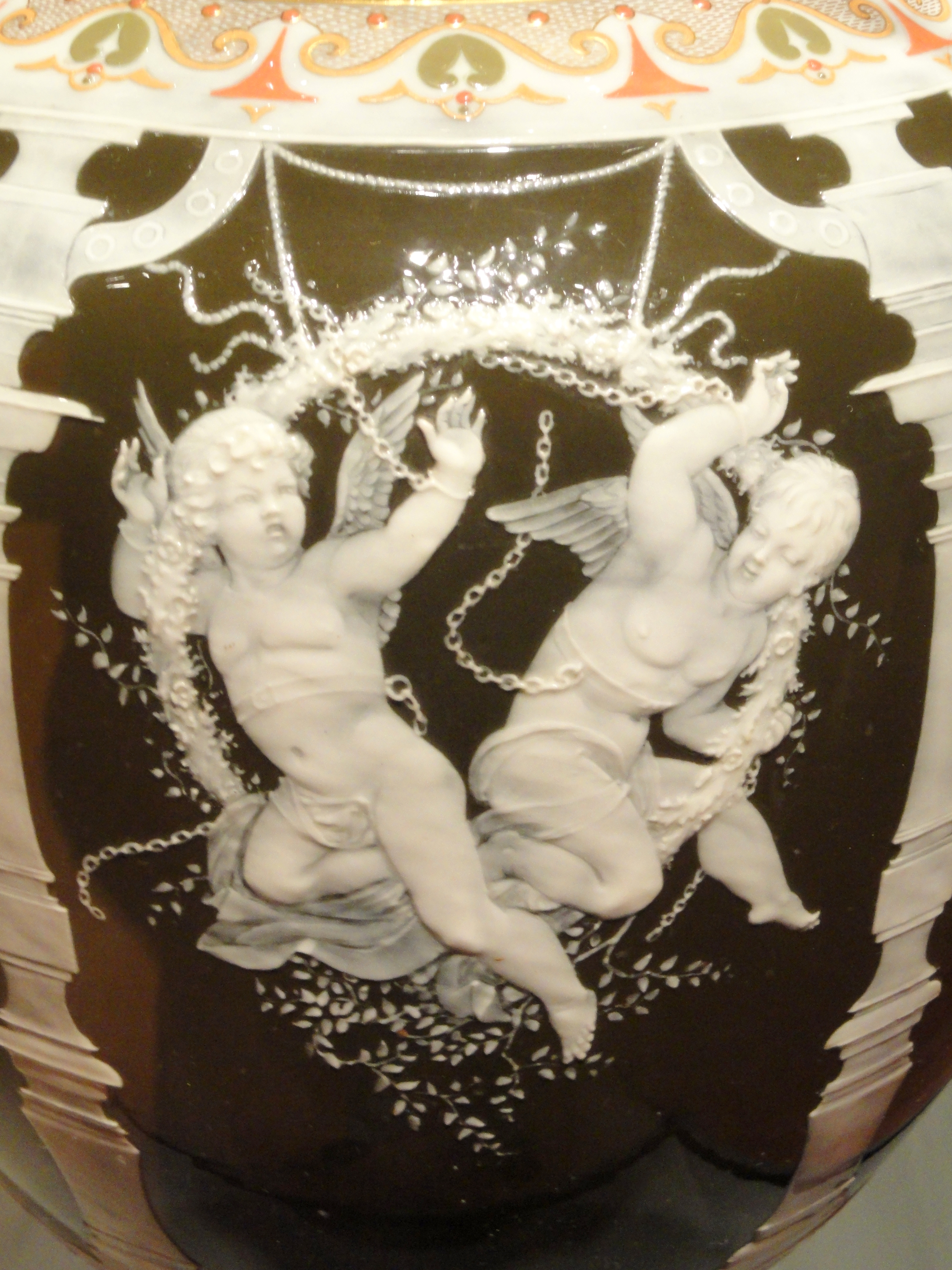
Marc-Louis-Emmanuel Solon at Mount Holyoke College Art Museum

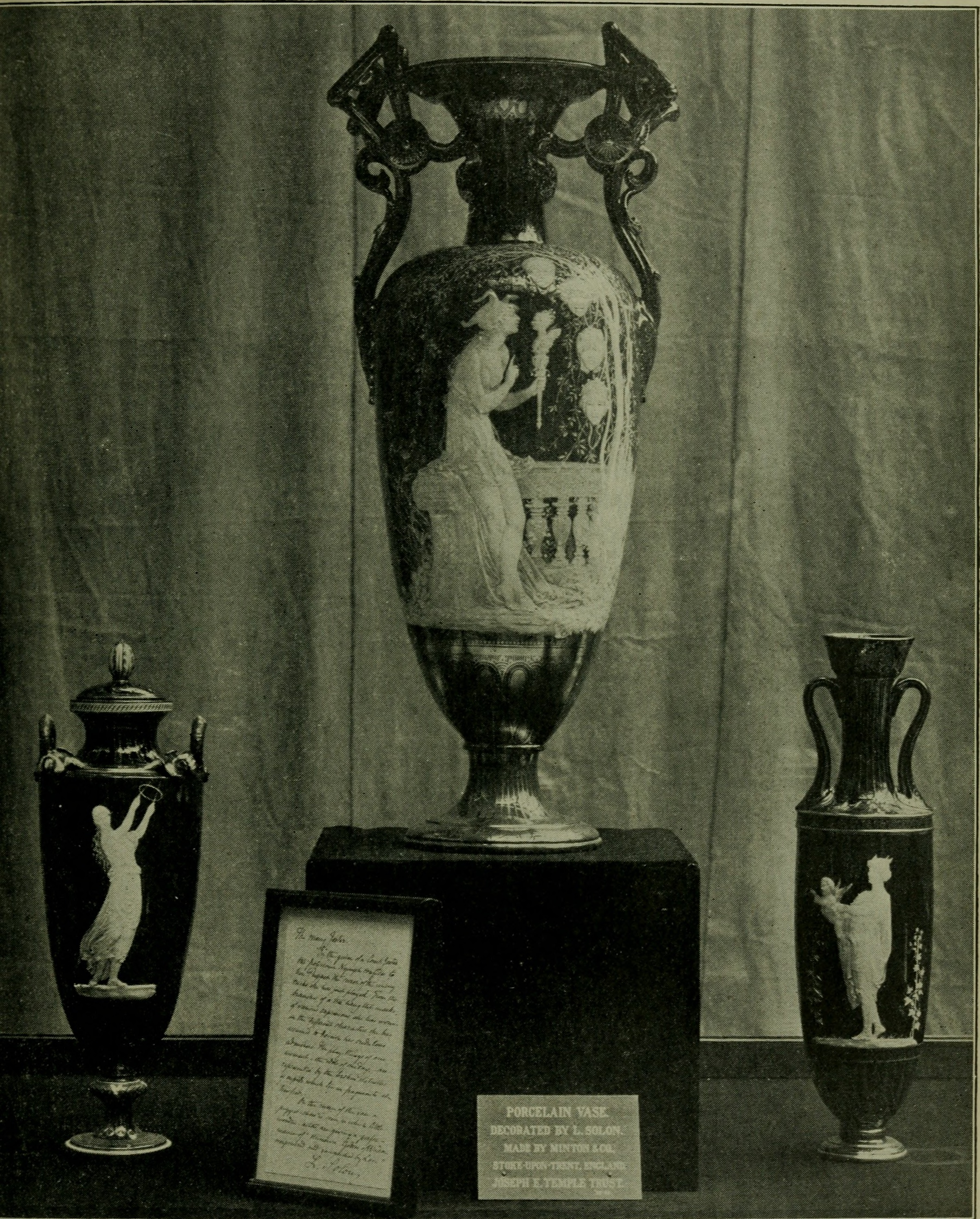
1900 Annual Report of the Philadelphia Museum of Art

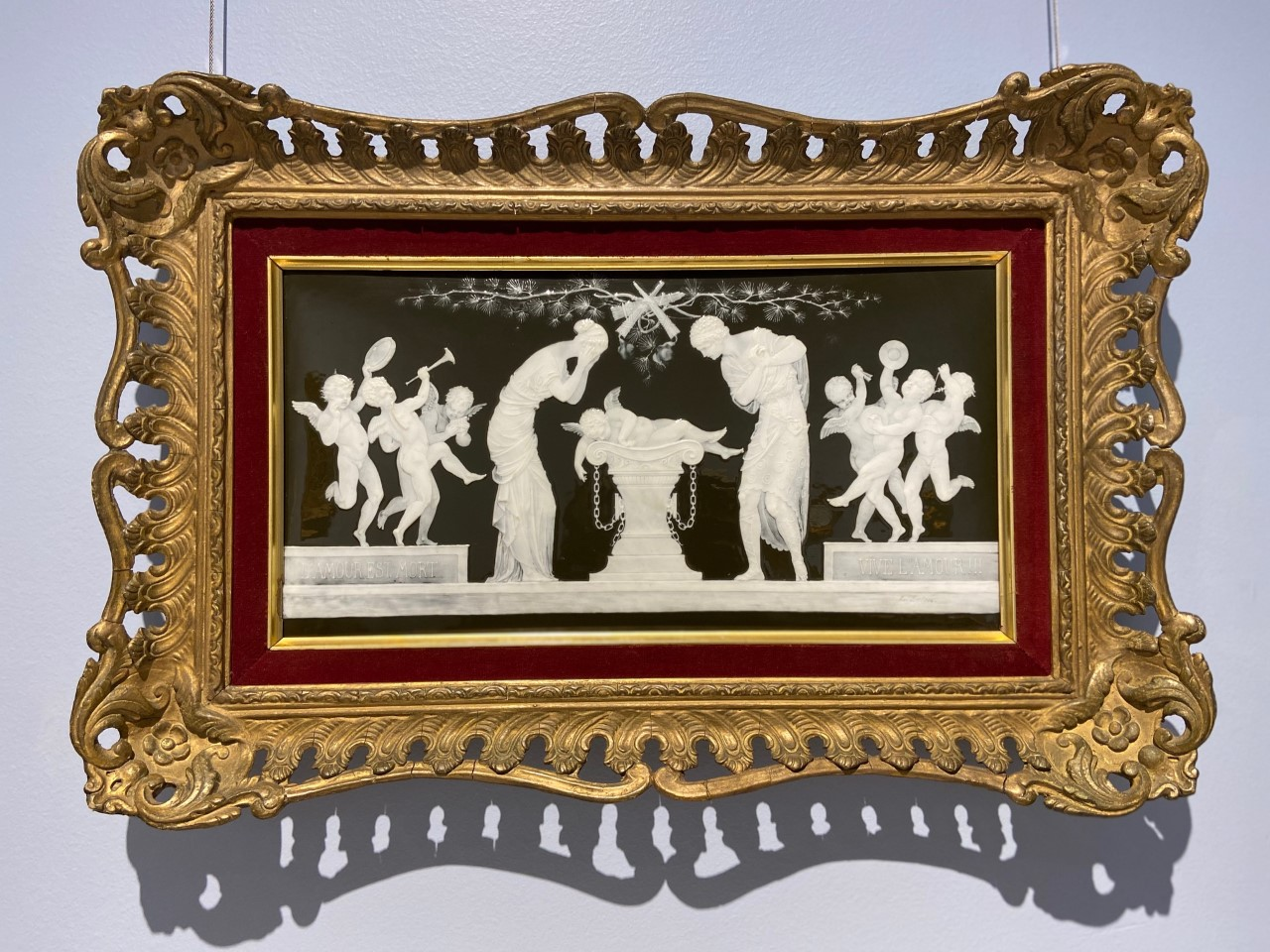
Minton Porcelain Plaque designed by Marc-Louis Solon. Circa 1880.

== Literary interests ==
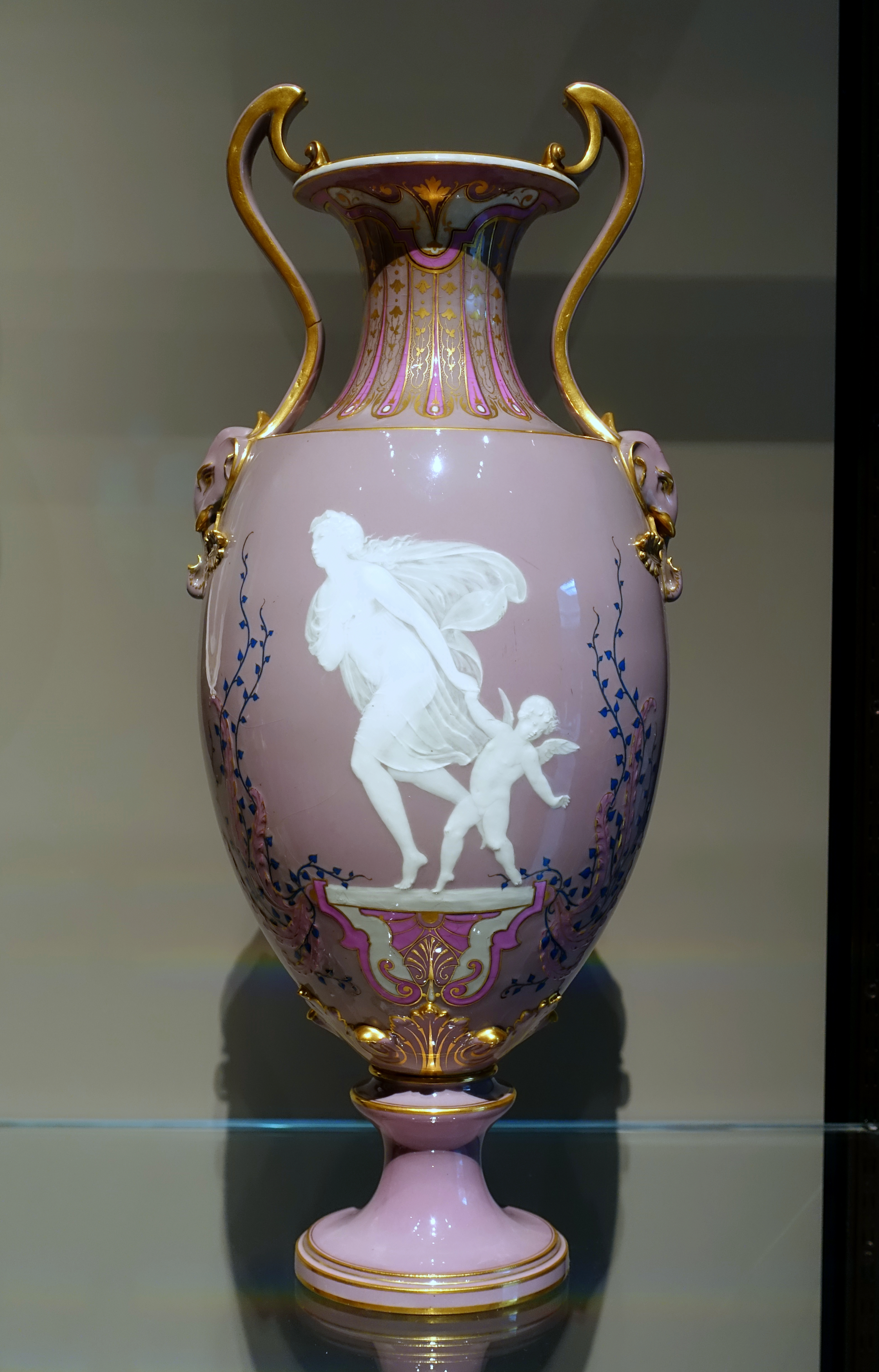
Vase by Marc-Louis Emanuel Solon, Sèvres Porcelain Factory, 1869, at Wadsworth Atheneum - Hartford, CT

During his early years in Staffordshire Solon collected local pottery. He used the collection as the basis of his 1883 publication, The Art of the Old English Potter, a book about pottery produced before Josiah Wedgwood transformed the industry.

Other publications include:

- A History and Description of the old French Faïence (London, 1903)
- A History and Description of Italian Maiolica (London, 1907)
- Ceramic Literature (London, 1910)
- Pottery Worship. The Fallen Idols. A series of detached papers dealing with subjects usually neglected in the general histories of the Ceramic Art; read before the members of the North Staffordshire Literary and Philosophical Society by M.L. Solon. Reprinted by permission of the Executors of the Author (London 1928)

He also collected books about ceramics and after his death, his library was acquired by the local technical college with funds provided by the Carnegie United Kingdom Trust.
