= John William Wadsworth =

British ceramicist

John William Wadsworth (1879–1955) was a British ceramicist.

Wadsworth came from Macclesfield where he studied art before winning a scholarship to the Royal College of Art in London. He was recruited in 1900 by Mintons, then one of the leading pottery companies in Stoke-on-Trent. The company needed to expand its sales and to this end Wadsworth collaborated closely with the art director Léon-Victor Solon on Art Nouveau designs. Art Nouveau ceramics were in vogue in the first decade of the 20th century, but these designs have been seen as continental rather than British in style. Mintons marketed them as "secessionist ware" in reference to the Vienna Secession art movement. The ware is typically tubelined.

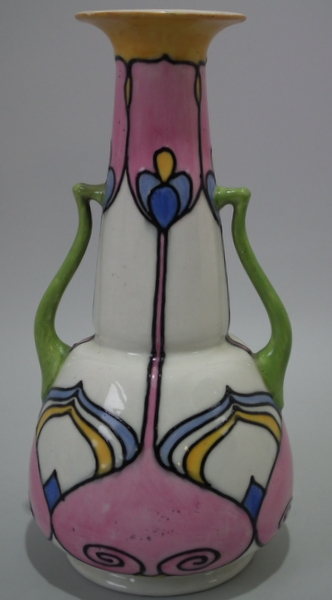

He moved to the Royal Worcester Porcelain Company as Art Director in 1915.

== Legacy ==
John Wadsworth was the father of the potter Philip Wadsworth, born in Stoke-on-Trent in 1910. After Philip Wadsworth's death, there was a sale of work by father and son at the London auctioneers Phillips (8 April 1992).

Art work by Wadsworth is preserved in the Minton Archive, although it is sometimes difficult to distinguish his designs from those of Solon.
