= Arequipa Pottery =

Type of pottery producer in Marin County, California, U.S.

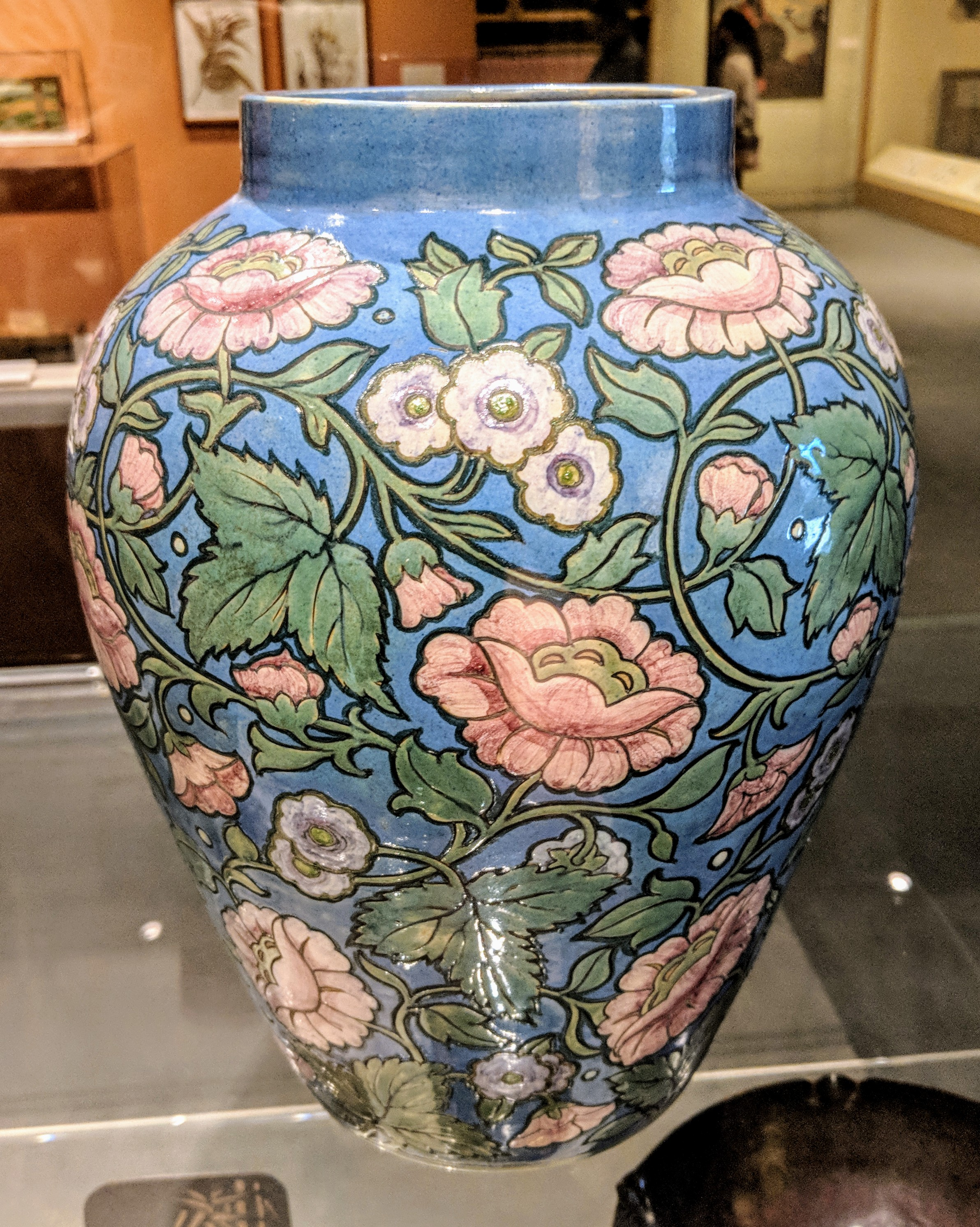
A vase by Arequipa Pottery on display at the Oakland Museum of California

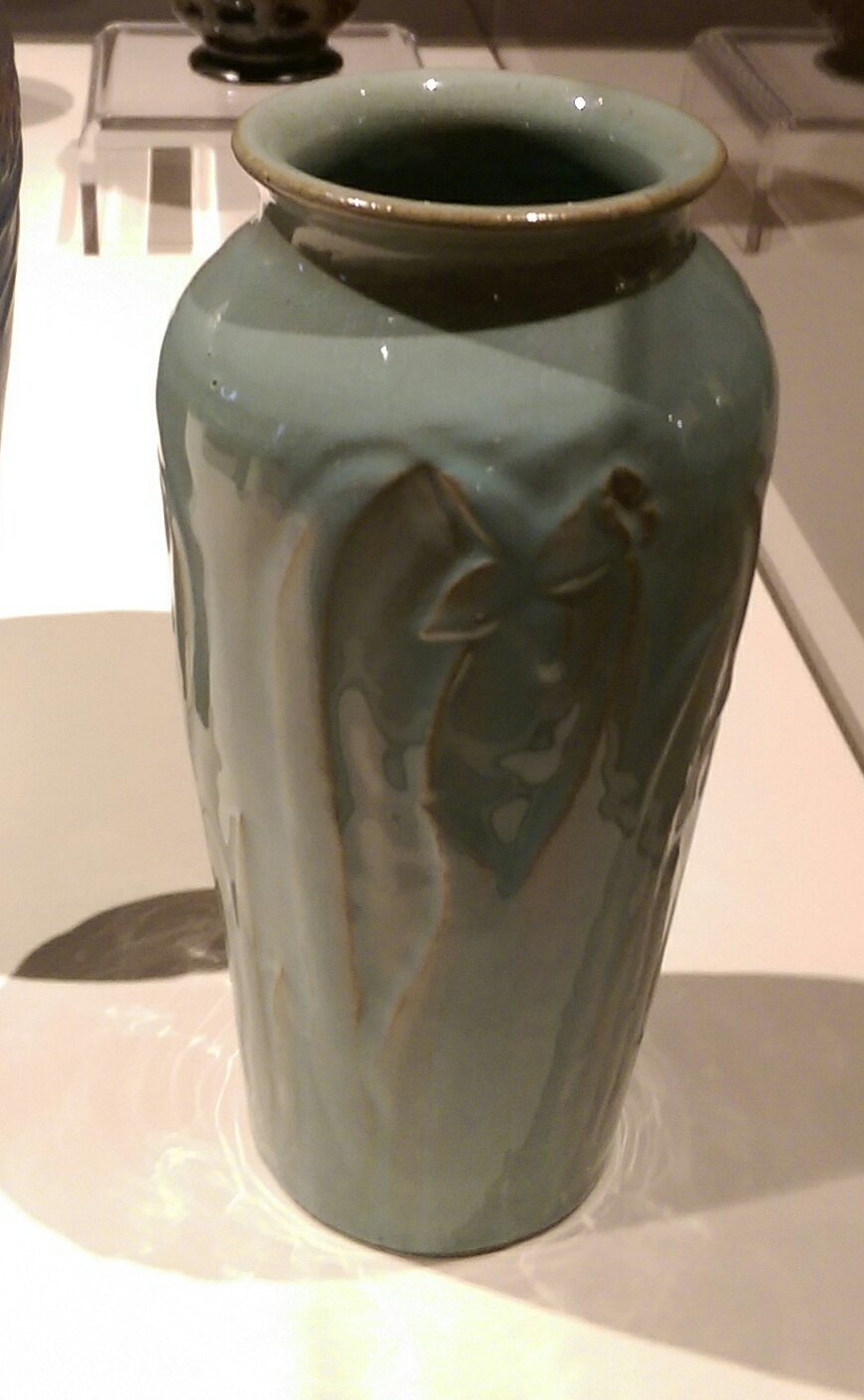
A daffodil vase by Arequipa Pottery on display at the Crocker Art Museum in Sacramento, California

Arequipa Pottery was an art pottery attached to a sanatorium in Marin County, California in the United States. Using local clay, it produced arts and crafts-style ware from 1911 until 1918. Arequipa Pottery aimed to be viable, but it differed from other pottery businesses because its output was part of a therapy process for women recovering from tuberculosis in the San Francisco Bay Area.

== Founder: Dr. Philip King Brown ==
Arequipa Pottery was established by Dr. Philip King Brown as part of the rehabilitative therapy program at a tuberculosis sanatorium located outside of Fairfax, California. The pottery was active from 1911 through 1918.

Following the 1906 San Francisco earthquake, dust-and ash-filled air contributed to a tuberculosis epidemic in San Francisco. The incidence of the disease was much higher among women than men. The Arequipa Sanatorium, directed by Brown, was opened to serve women in the first stages of tuberculosis. At the time, the only known treatment was rest and good nutrition, in the hopes that the lungs could recover and heal.

Brown got his first taste of running a sanatorium when he inherited a large house left to him by a wealthy relative located in Santa Barbara, California. The name of this facility was Miradero, established to rehabilitate "nervous cases." At that time, treatment for tuberculosis, or TB, in a sanatorium was costly and there were few alternatives where working-class women could go to recover from this illness. Brown was active with the San Francisco Tuberculosis Polyclinic, which was a facility where people learned about the prevention and treatment of tuberculosis. This experience motivated Brown's desire to establish a facility which was affordable for working-class women.

== Arts and Crafts Movement ==
The Arts and Crafts movement flourished from 1860 - 1910. The movement encouraged production of hand crafted goods. The production and growth of American art pottery began in the 1870s with a group of women in Cincinnati, Ohio. The most famous pottery artists were Maria Longworth Nichols Storer (1849-1932) and Mary Louise McLaughlin (1847-1939). China painting was an activity considered appropriate for middle and upper-class women during this time and influenced the decision to using ceramics as the choice of craft work to be produced at Arequipa. With the help of local artists and members of the area's philanthropic community, Brown introduced therapeutic handcrafts to the women. The Arts and Crafts Movement believed that crafts could provide great satisfaction. In addition, the director wanted to combat idleness, avoid the stigma of charity, and produce revenue. The idea of ceramics as a form of occupational therapy had been pioneered by a sanatorium at Marblehead, Massachusetts in 1904.

== Establishing the sanatorium ==
Brown's mother was Dr. Charlotte Blake Brown, a renowned physician in the early history of San Francisco. Dr. Brown received his medical degree from Harvard University in 1893. Brown then returned to California, established his practice and also was a teacher. In 1900, he married Helen Hillyer, who was mentored by Phoebe Apperson Hearst. As a result of this mentorship, Ms. Hillyer and the Hearst family remained friends for the rest of their lives.

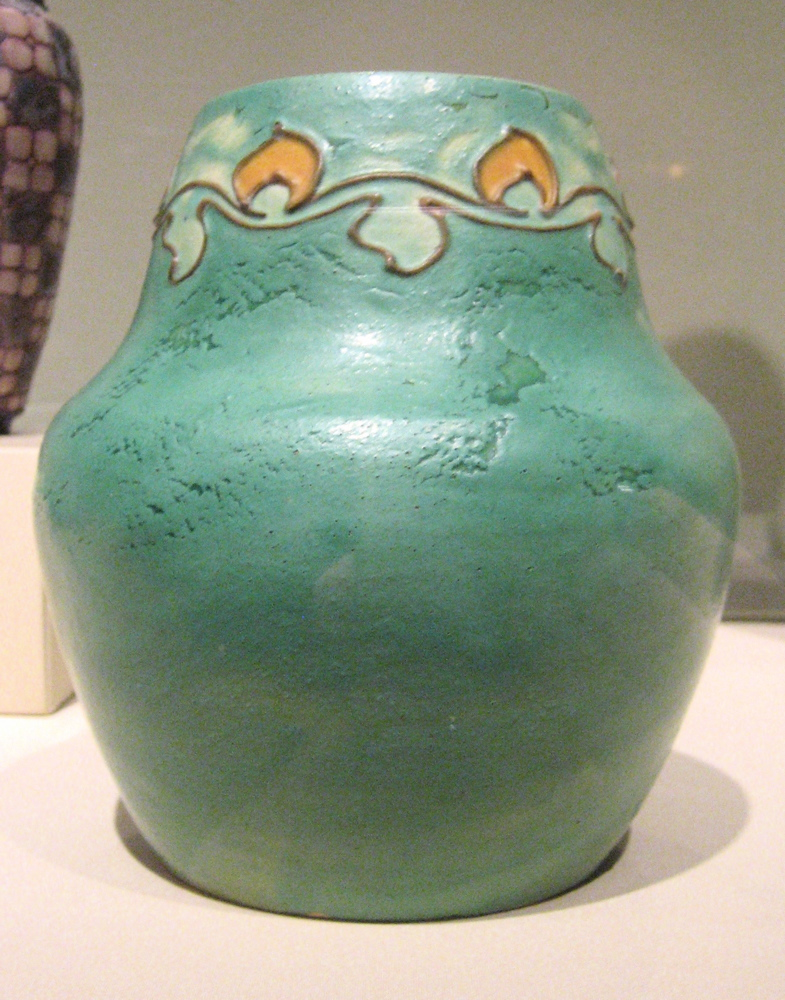
An Arequipa vase on display at LACMA. It has slip-trailed decoration featuring an ivy leaf design.

In 1909 Henry Bothin, a philanthropist and business magnate who obtained is wealth through real estate, learned about Brown's desire to establish an affordable sanatorium and contacted him about building a clinic on some land he owned in Fairfax, California. In 1905 Bothin donated land in Fairfax to the Telegraph Hill Neighborhood House, a community center and clinic located in San Francisco. The property in Fairfax, called Hill Farm, provided a place where mothers and children convalesce from their ill health. Bothin offered a piece of land to Brown which was located below Hill Farm. It is of interest to note that this land was once owned by Phoebe Hearst. Brown accepted the offer from Bothin, and construction for the sanatorium began in April 1911 and officially opened on September 9, 1911. The official name of this institution was Arequipa Sanatorium and it was designed by well-known San Francisco architect John Bakewell. The name "Arequipa" - based on the name of the homonym city of Arequipa in Peru - is from a Peruvian aboriginal language which would allegedly mean "Place of rest", though this interpretation was actually based on some popular etymology.

== Pottery ==
Most of the clay used by the pottery was dug locally by boys who did the heavy work. The patients spent a limited number of hours per day finishing and decorating the pots. Production was directed by a succession of ceramists: Frederick Hurten Rhead, Albert Solon, and Fred Wilde. All three were from the UK and showed interest in teaching ceramics. As pottery designers, they had their own ideas with staff turnover resulting in dramatic variations in style. The patients added surface decorations, either in the form of designs painted on the surface or patterns carved into the damp clay.

Rhead, who headed the pottery from 1911 until 1913, trained as a potter in Staffordshire. Prior to moving to California, he had worked for Edward Gardner Lewis at University City, Missouri where his activities included running a pottery correspondence course. Rhead introduced slip trailing, a technique which became the signature form of decoration of Arequipa pottery. The most common design under Rhead's tenure was a band of stylized ivy leaves.

The management of the sanatorium became unhappy with his approach to the pottery as a business. After he had gone, there was some criticism of the pots being produced, but Rhead's artistic talent does not appear to have really been questioned, the problem was the business model. In July 1913 Rhead was replaced as director of the pottery by Albert Solon, Solon, like Rhead, was from Staffordshire where Rhead's father had served his apprenticeship under Solon's father. Solon implemented cuts in running costs, but found a place for his brother Camille, a talented artist who had studied at the Slade School of Fine Art. In 1915, at the Panama–Pacific International Exposition in San Francisco, the Arequipa Tuberculosis Sanatorium exhibited its ceramic works in the fair's Palace of Education, where discharged patients demonstrated pottery-making and sold examples of the product.

Albert Solon left in 1916 to take up a position at San Jose Normal School. Arequipa's 1916 Annual Report referred to the appointment of his successor. "In Mr. Wilde we shall have not only a skilled technician and experienced potter but a man who comes to us largely because of his interest in our peculiar problem of supplying a remunerative and educational occupation for convalescent girls." Wilde expanded the range of tiles produced. However, wartime conditions created problems for the Arequipa pottery which ceased operation in 1918. It was revived for a few years before closing definitively.

As TB came under the control of antibiotic treatment, the sanatorium was converted to a hospital. Standards of care kept changing, and there was little need for it. After being closed in 1957, the hospital and sanatorium facility were offered for use as a Girl Scout camp in 1960. Eventually the property was donated to the local council, which raised funds for new facilities, such as a swimming pool. Other changes have been made so the property serves current needs.

The Oakland Museum of California has the largest existing holding of pottery and tiles from Arequipa, with more than 100 pieces in its collections. The products of the Arequipa Pottery have become highly prized among collectors.
