= Pâte-sur-pâte =

Method of porcelain decoration

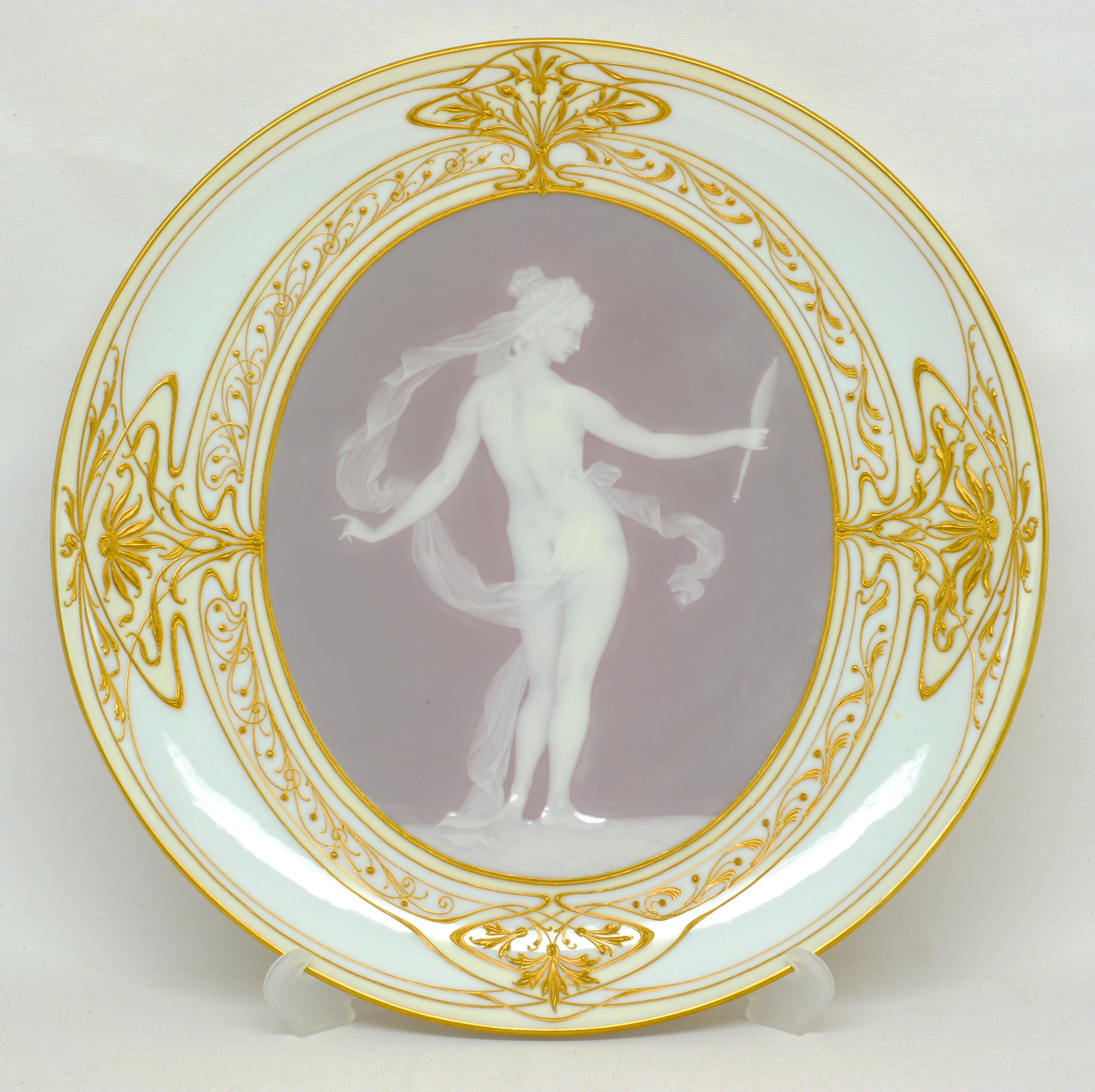
Berlin porcelain plate.

Pâte-sur-pâte is a French term meaning "paste on paste". It is a method of porcelain decoration in which a relief design is created on an unfired, unglazed body, usually with a coloured body, by applying successive layers of (usually) white porcelain slip (liquid clay) with a brush. Once the main shape is built up, it is carved away to give fine detail, before the piece is fired. The work is very painstaking and may take weeks of adding extra layers and allowing them to harden before the next is applied.

The usual colour scheme is a white relief on a contrasting coloured background, which in England was often Parian ware. The effect is somewhat similar to other types of relief decoration, in particular sprigging. However, unlike Jasperware, for example, a mould is not normally used, and the ceramic artist is able to achieve translucency. The method also gives results resembling cameos in stone or cameo glass.

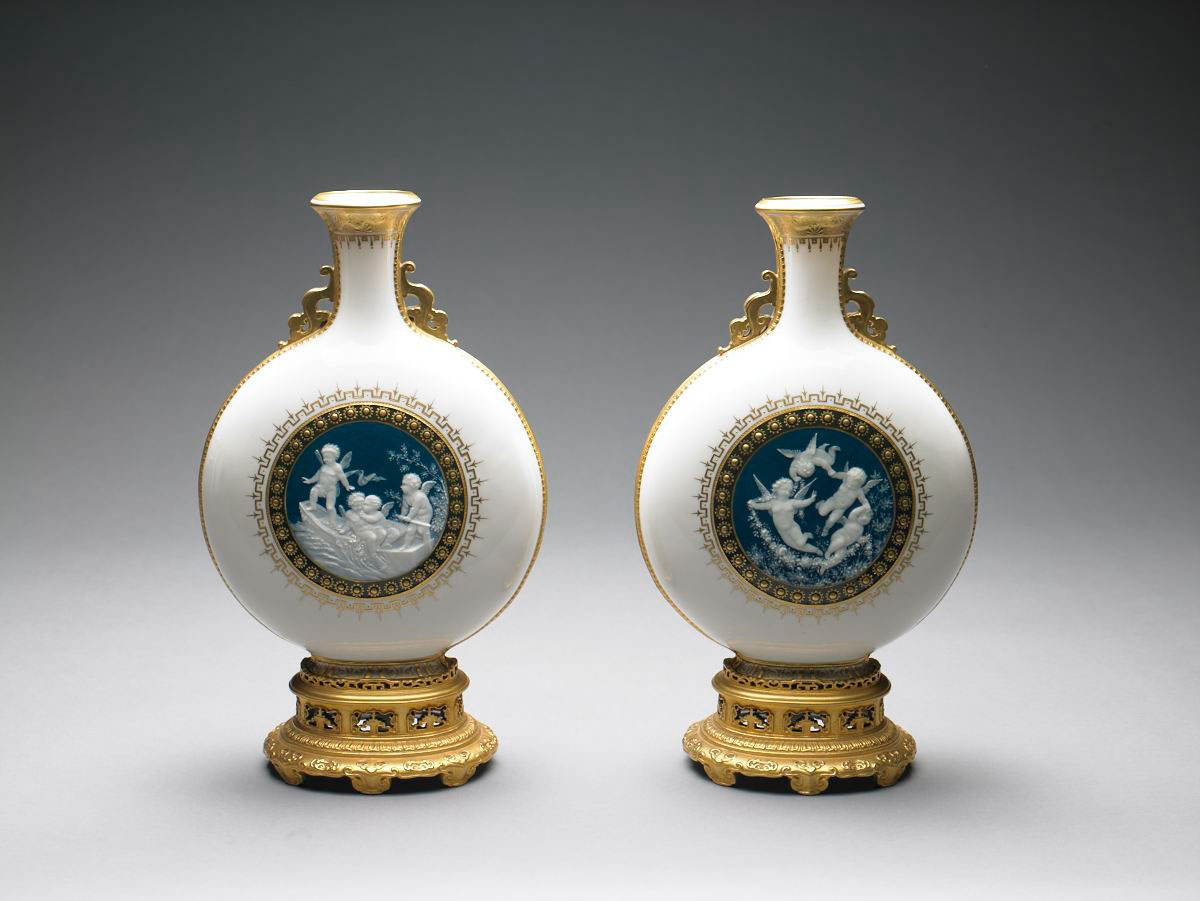
Pâte-sur-pâte decoration by Henry Hollins, a former apprentice of Solon, on a pair of vases from Mintons, c. 1882. Birmingham Museum of Art

The development of pâte-sur-pâte dates back to 1850 in France, and an accident that occurred at the Manufacture nationale de Sèvres. The company was trying to reproduce a decorative technique from a Chinese vase, but misinterpreting the vase, the experiment took them along a different path from the Chinese potter. They perfected what became known as pâte-sur-pâte.

Marc-Louis Solon took the style to England, and others to Germany and Austria. The period within 15 years either side of 1900 was the heyday of the technique. Many pieces made in the State, formerly Imperial Porcelain Factory in Leningrad after World War II are said to use it, but are perhaps sprigged, then hand-finished. Bronislav Bystrushkin designed many, mostly using the classic Jasperware "Wedgwood blue" and white.

== Nineteenth century ==
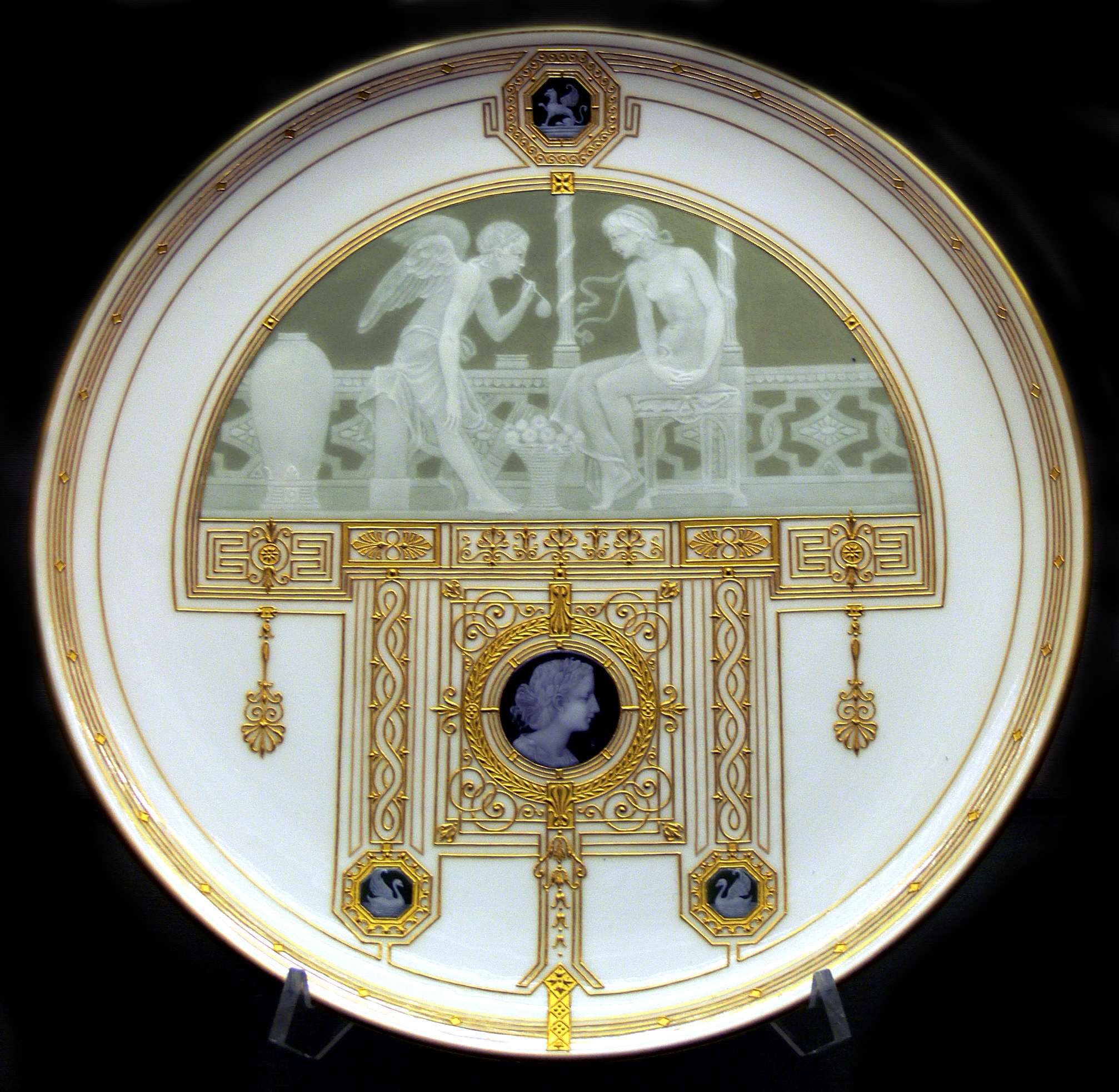
Berlin porcelain plate, 1900.

Another notable maker was Marc-Louis Solon, who perfected the technique and was for most of his working life the leading exponent of the technique. Solon was born in France in 1835 and from an early age developed a considerable talent for art. Some of Solon's work later fell to the attention of the art director of Sèvres and he was soon after employed as a ceramic artist and designer. He was tasked along with H Regnault and Gelly to work upon the pâte-sur-pâte process which was still only at the trial stage. Sèvres reached a high level of refinement of their pottery. Praising the facilities of the day, Solon commented that "We were never limited as to time and cost", a luxury in any industry. Solon also began to produce pieces of pâte-sur-pâte in his own time under the name Miles, said to be based on his initials M L S. There are a number of these in the Victoria and Albert Museum's collection, as well as in the collection of the former Minton Museum.

The Franco-Prussian War of 1870 led Solon to flee his native country and seek refuge in England, where he established contact with Colin Minton Campbell of Mintons Ltd, Staffordshire. Mintons had a history of employing foreign artists. Its first Frenchman arrived in 1848, the art director Léon Arnoux, followed by other French makers such as the sculptor Albert-Ernest Carrier-Belleuse, so Solon was joining a small continental community when he settled in Staffordshire and married Arnoux's daughter. The Solons brought up a large family at The Villas near the Mintons factory. To meet the demand for pâte-sur-pâte he was assigned English apprentices including Frederick Alfred Rhead. There ensued a golden age of pâte-sur-pâte in Stoke-on-Trent stretching into the early years of the 20th century.

== Pâte-sur-pâte in the twentieth century ==
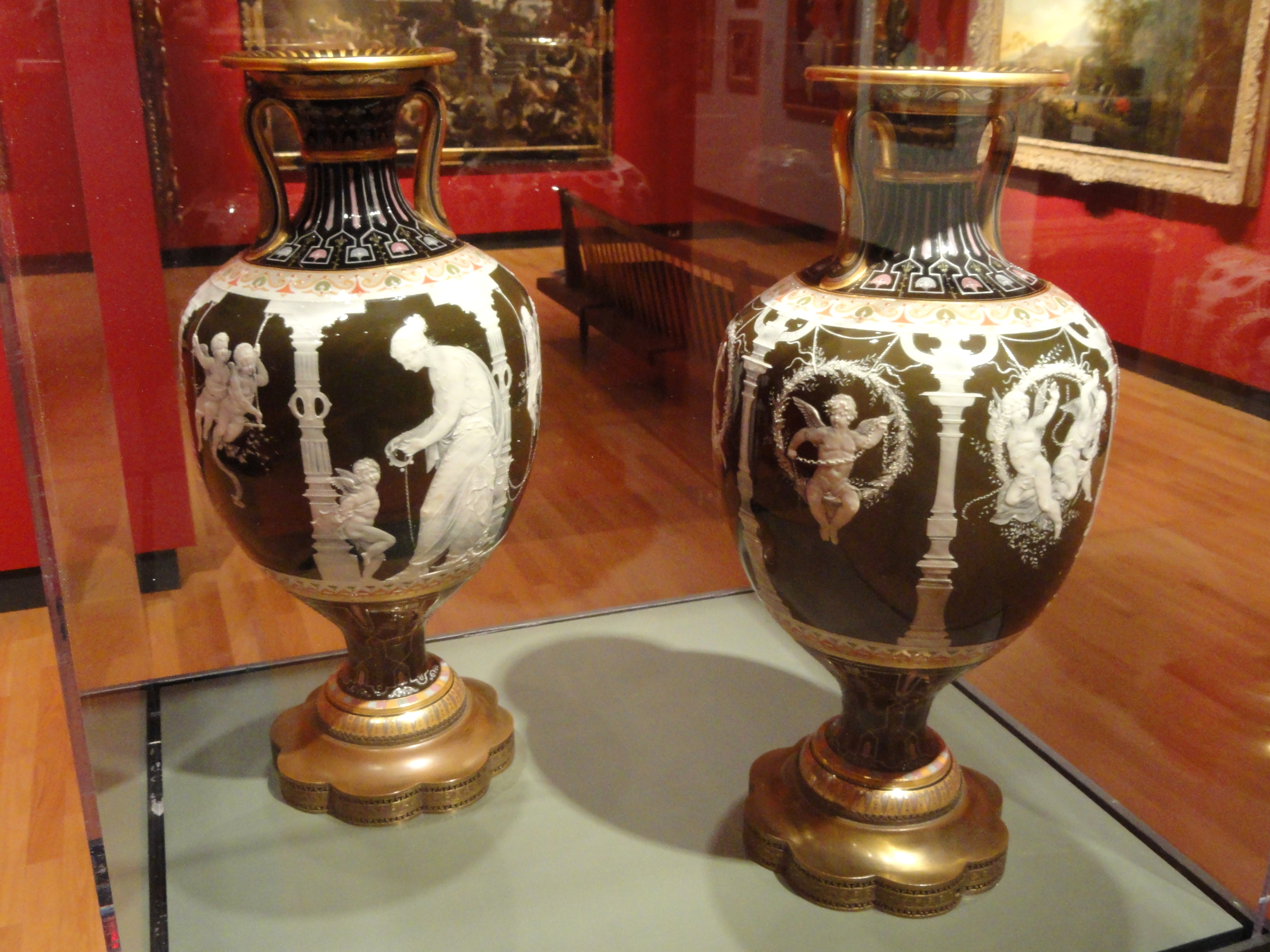
Mintons vases designed by Solon in the pâte-sur-pâte style, 1880, on display at Mount Holyoke College Art Museum

Minton remained the main producer of pâté-sur-pâté in the twentieth century, despite competition from other firms. However, Minton faced financial problems at the beginning of the twentieth century and pâté-sur-pâté became less important to the firm's output. After Solon retired, his son Leon Solon was art director at Minton, but he was associated with tube-lined Art Nouveau designs rather than pâte-sur-pâte.

With Solon's death in 1913 and the advent of the First World War, an era had ended for pâte-sur-pâte. After the War its popularity declined like other nineteenth-century fashions. However, there was still some demand, and Minton continued to produce pâté-sur-pâté until the outbreak of the Second World War, when the production of decorated ceramics was severely curtailed. After the Second World War, business improved at Minton and the firm considered resuming production of pâte-sur-pâte, for which there was still some demand. However, with the death of Solon's apprentices, the scarcity of suitable artists posed a problem. It was not until 1992 that Minton used the technique once more in order to mark the firm's bicentenary. The result was a small number of vases, produced to some degree of success, these later vases being reproductions of earlier pieces by Alboin Birks, a gifted apprentice of Solon, who used moulds to speed production and combat costs.

Although tableware continues to be produced under the Minton brand-name, there is no longer a Minton factory. The Victorian buildings were replaced in the 1950s and these were in turn demolished when much pottery production moved overseas at the end of the twentieth century.

== American production ==
The French potter Taxile Doat was responsible for some production in the US at University City, Missouri in the early twentieth century. He was recruited by Edward Gardner Lewis for an Art Academy and Porcelain Works which was part of the People's University.

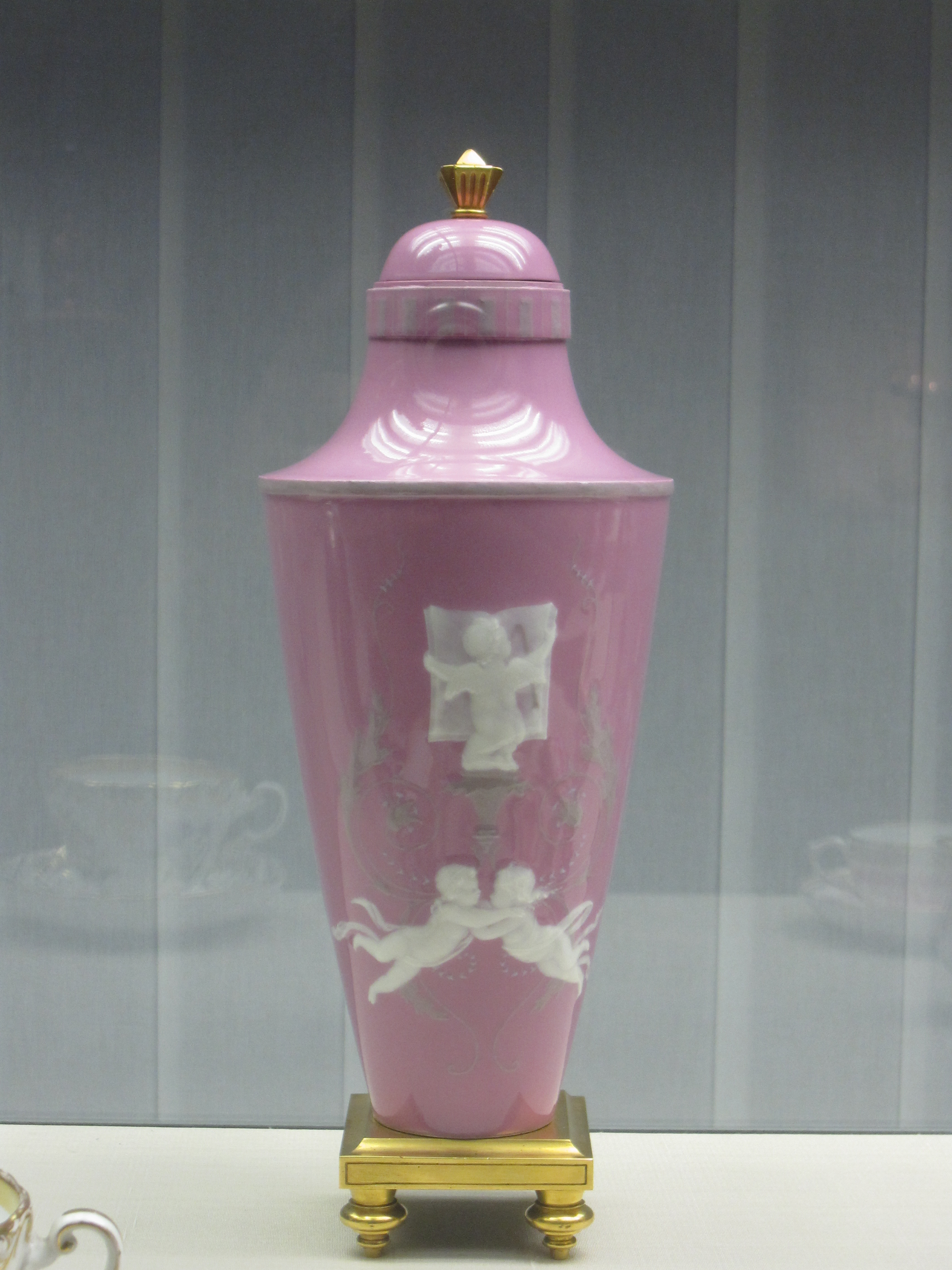
Sèvres porcelain vase, c. 1865

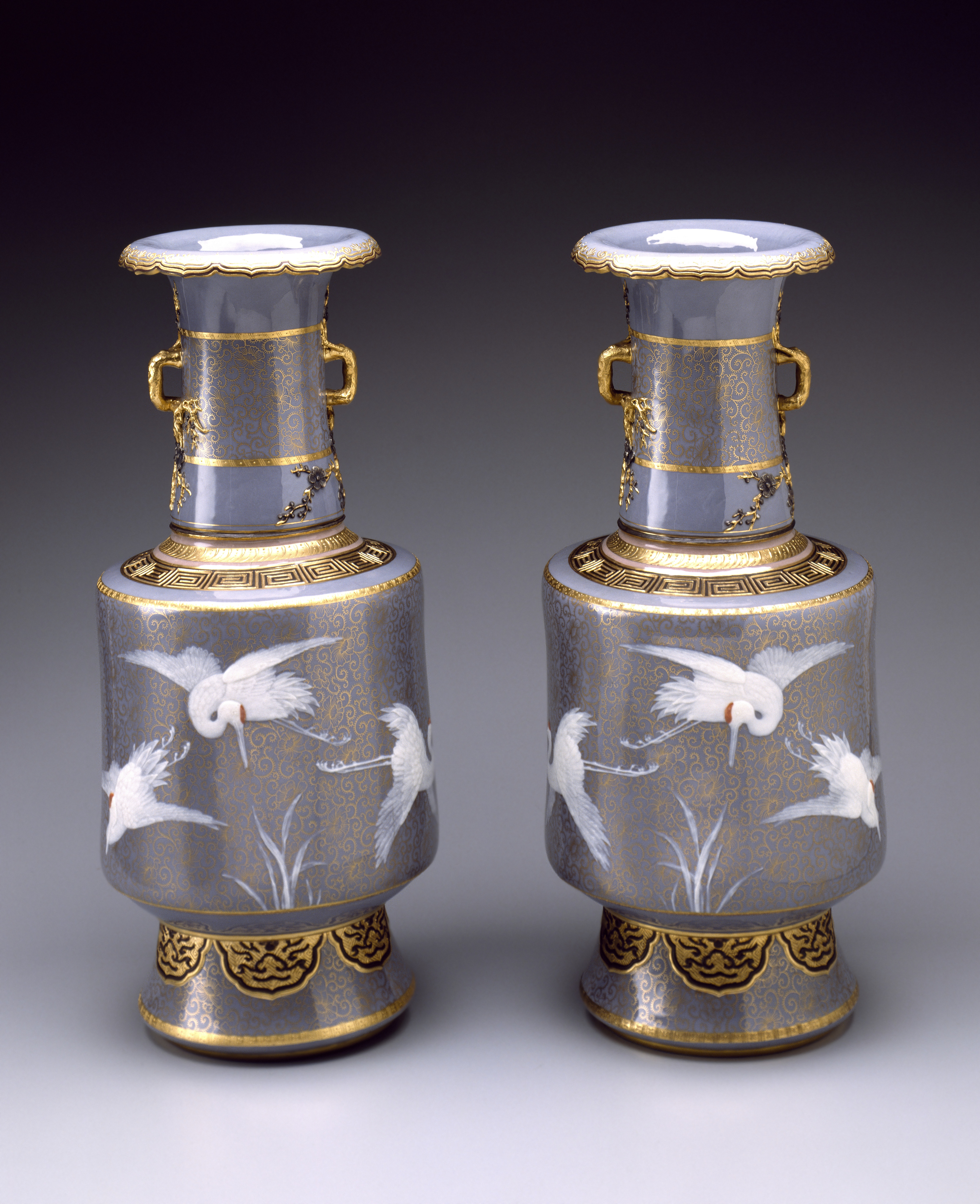
Mintons vases with cranes, 1871-1875

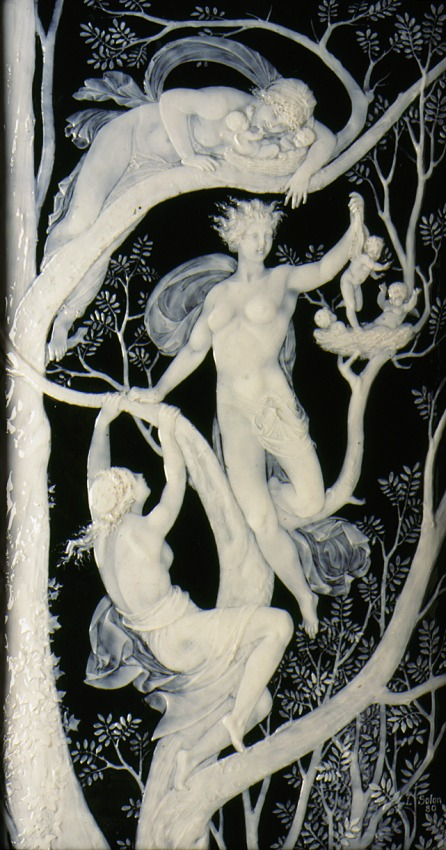
Solon plaque of Tree Spirits, 1880; made by Mintons for Tiffany & Co

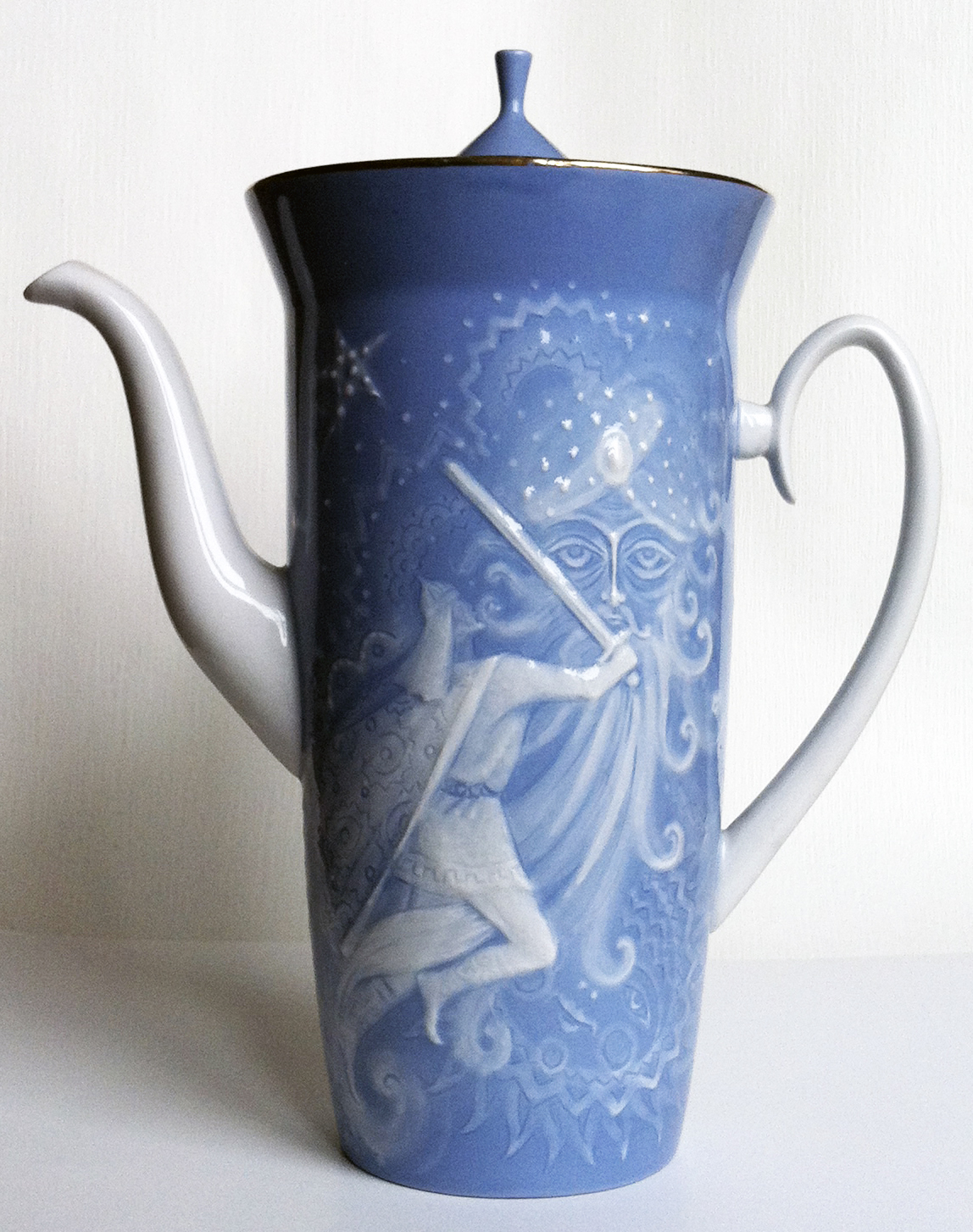
Leningrad coffee pot, with Ruslan and Ludmila, c. 1969

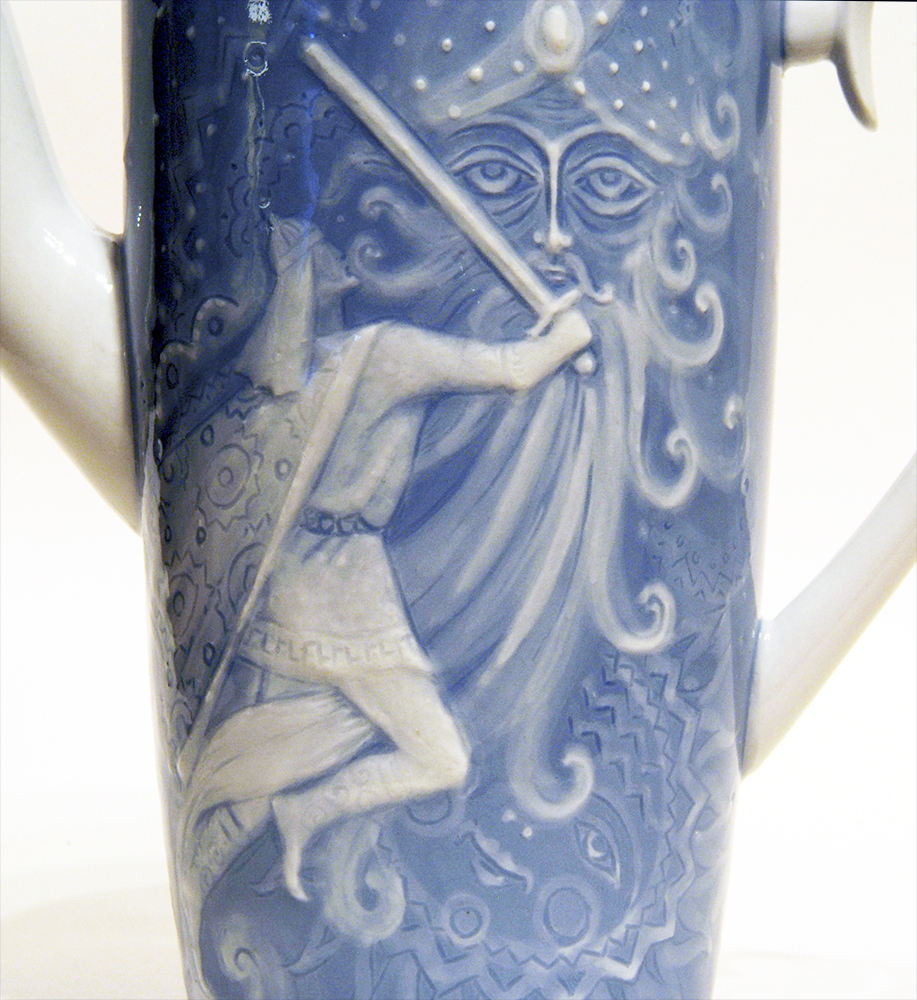
Detail of last
