= Hannah and Florence Barlow =

Pottery artists

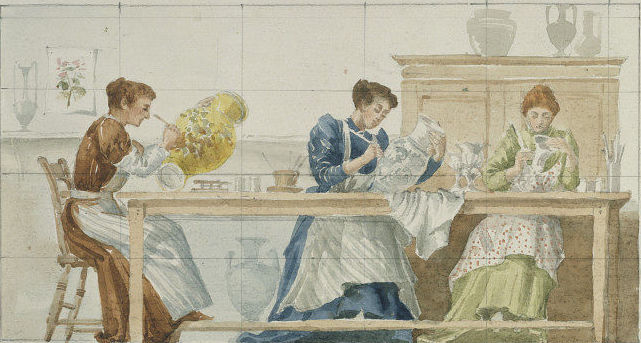
The sisters, plus another, painting in the Doulton studio, c. 1893. Probably Florence at right and Hannah centre.

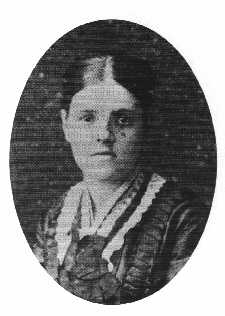
Hannah Barlow, 1867

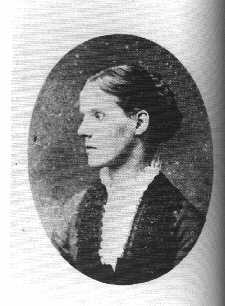
Florence Barlow, c. 1877

The sisters Hannah Bolton Barlow (born 2 November 1851 in Church End House, Little Hadham, Bishop's Stortford, Hertfordshire, England; died 15 November 1916) and Florence Elizabeth Barlow (born Bishop's Stortford) were artists who painted pottery for Doulton & Co. at their newly established art pottery studio in Lambeth, London. Doulton's Lambeth studio allowed the decorators to sign or monogram their work, which allows many pieces to be attributed to individuals, though often more than one person worked on a piece.

Their parents were bank manager Benjamin Barlow (1813–1866) and his wife Hannah (1816–1882). They had seven siblings, two of whom also worked for Doulton, Arthur (1845–1879) who died young and Lucy, who worked in the lesser role of a relief border decorator.

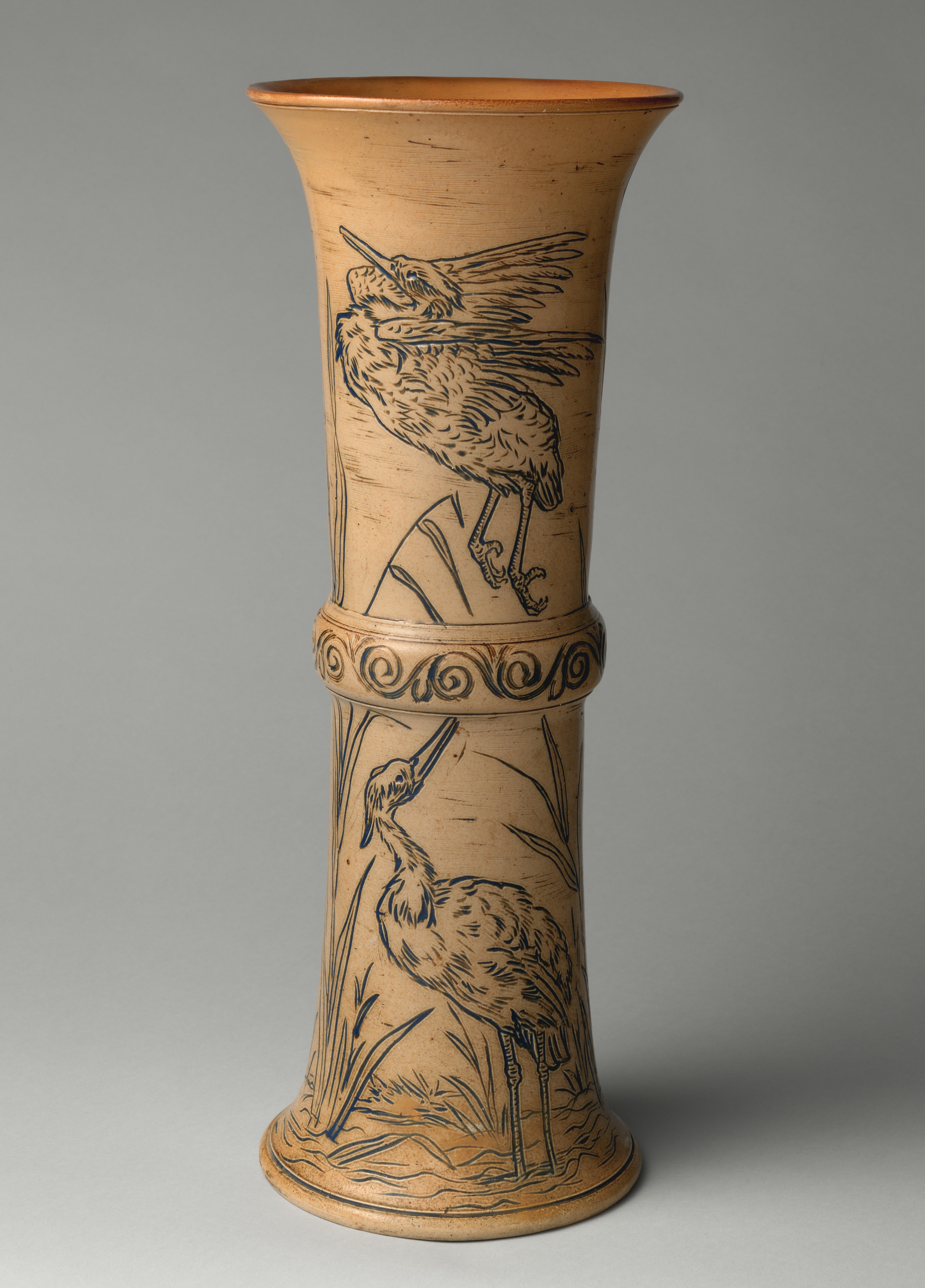
Doulton & Co., incised Lambeth stoneware by Hannah Barlow, 1874

Hannah, after studying at Lambeth School of Art, worked for Doulton from 1871, becoming the first female artist to work there. Florence followed, from 1873 to 1909. By mutual agreement, Florence specialised in painting flowers and birds, and Hannah in horses and other animals, which were often incised with a blade, the lines being then coloured and often paint added elsewhere. They sometimes worked together on individual pieces.

Hannah died on 15 November 1916 at 46 Binfield Road, Clapham, London. She was buried in Norwood cemetery on 20 November. Her sketchbooks are in the Sir Henry Doulton Gallery, Stoke-on-Trent.

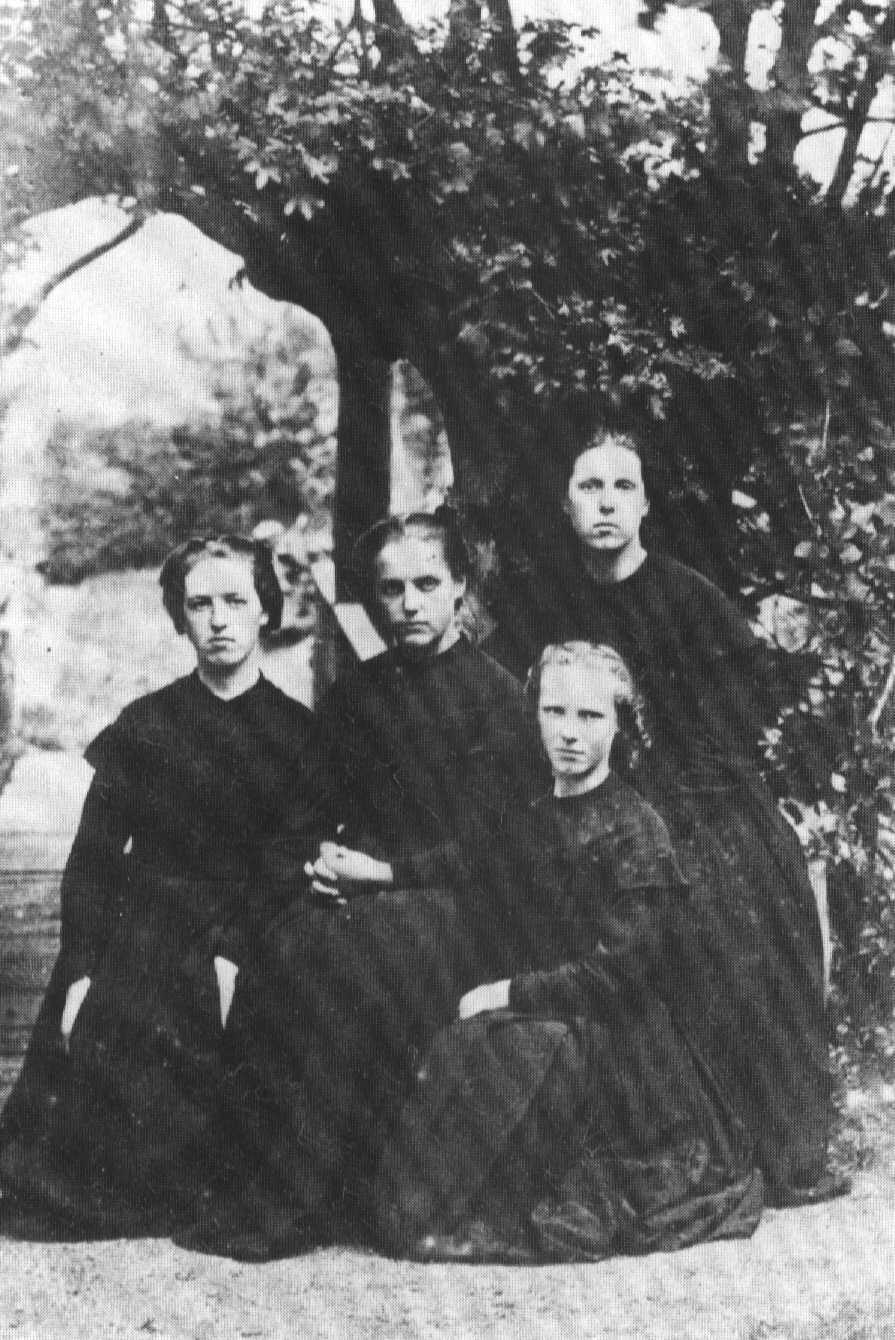
Alice, Frances, Lucy and Florence Barlow, 1867

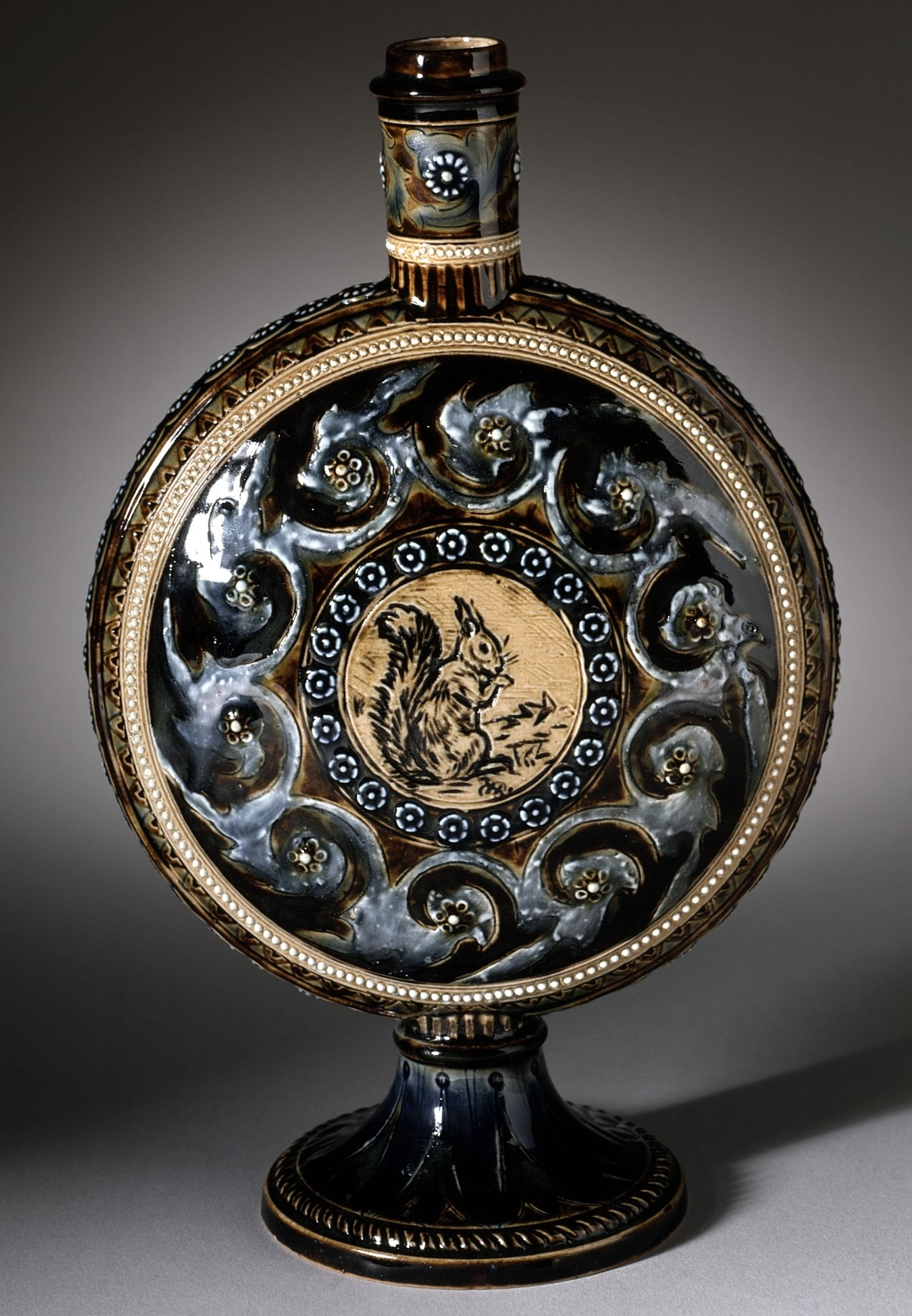
Doulton flask, Arthur B. and Hannah Barlow, 1875, salt-glazed stoneware

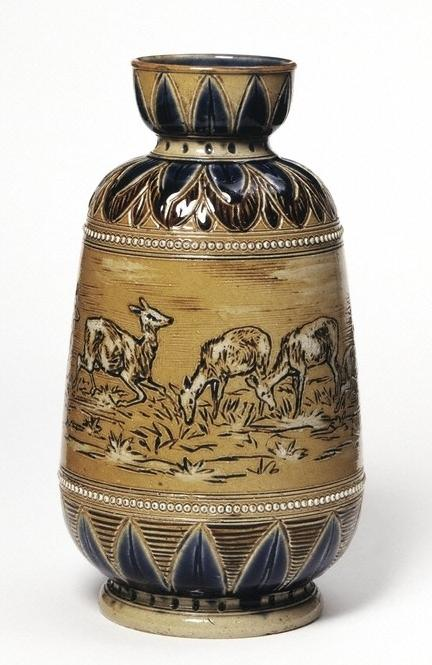
Incised and painted Doulton vase by Hannah Barlow, now in the V&A Museum

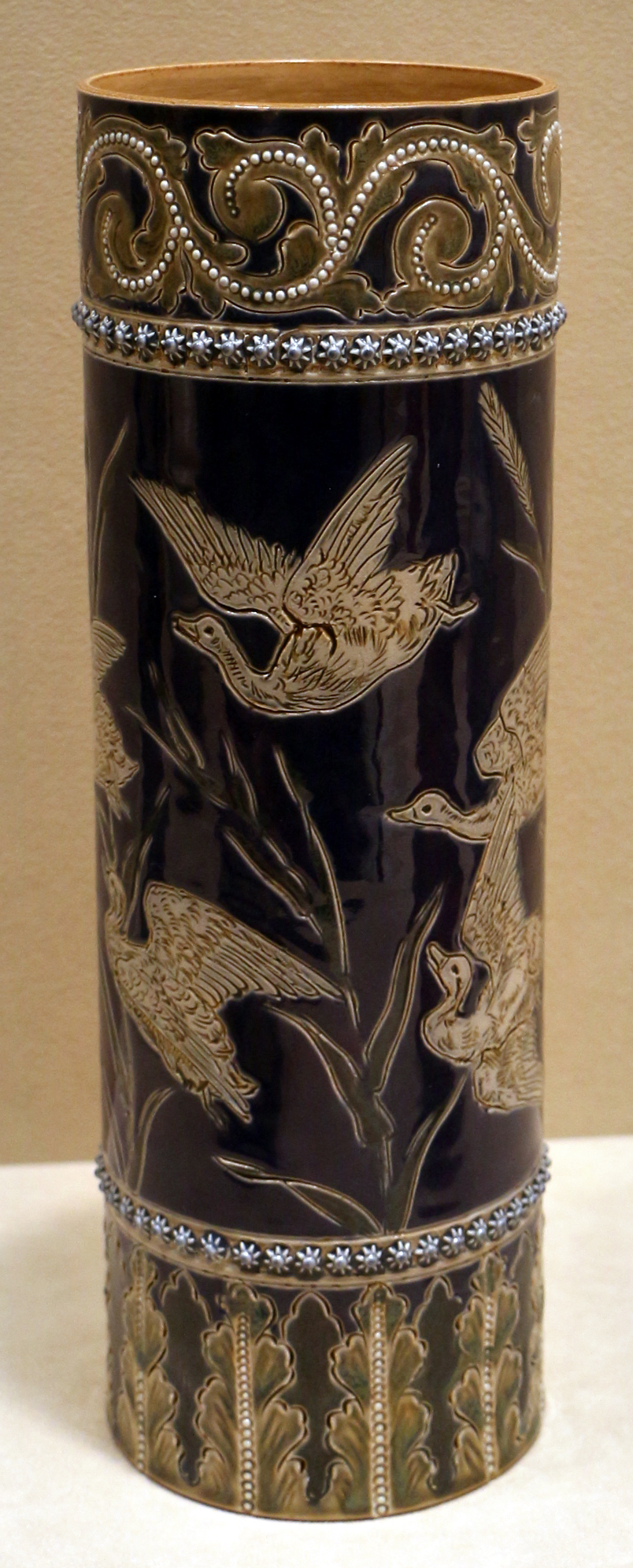
Doulton vase by Hannah Barlow and others
