= Barbotine =

Type of decoration on pottery

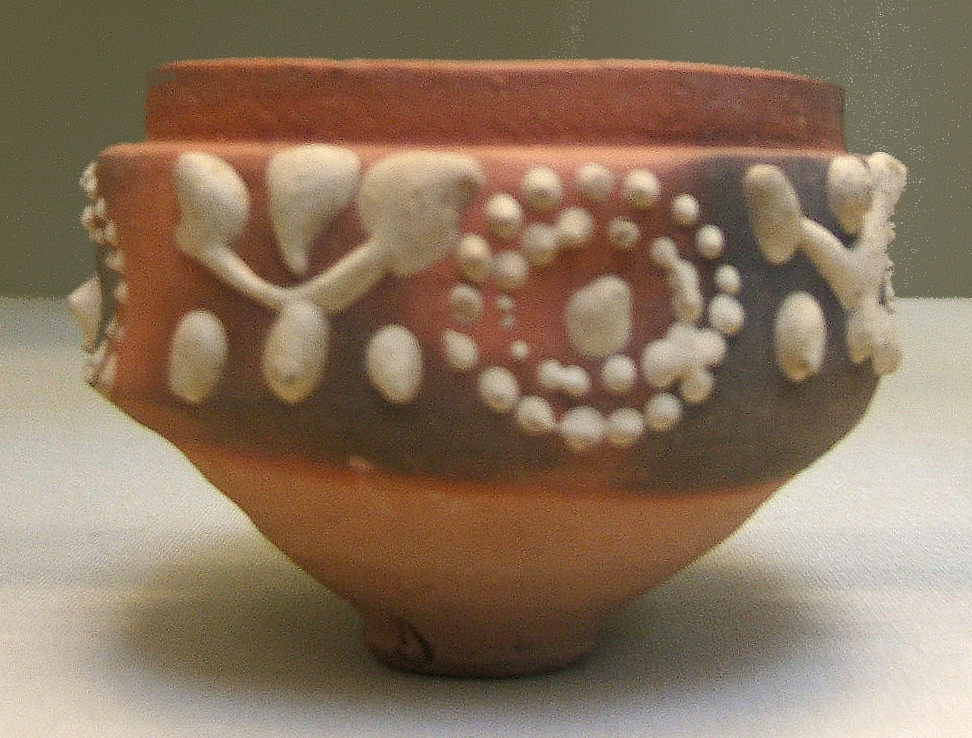
Cup, 6.5 cm. high, Aswan, Egypt, 1st-2nd century AD, decorated with type A piped or trailed barbotine patterns.

Barbotine is the French for ceramic slip, or a mixture of clay and water used for moulding or decorating pottery. In English the term is used for three different techniques of decorating pottery, though in all cases mainly for historical works. For clarity, these types are numbered here as A-C (which are not standard terms).

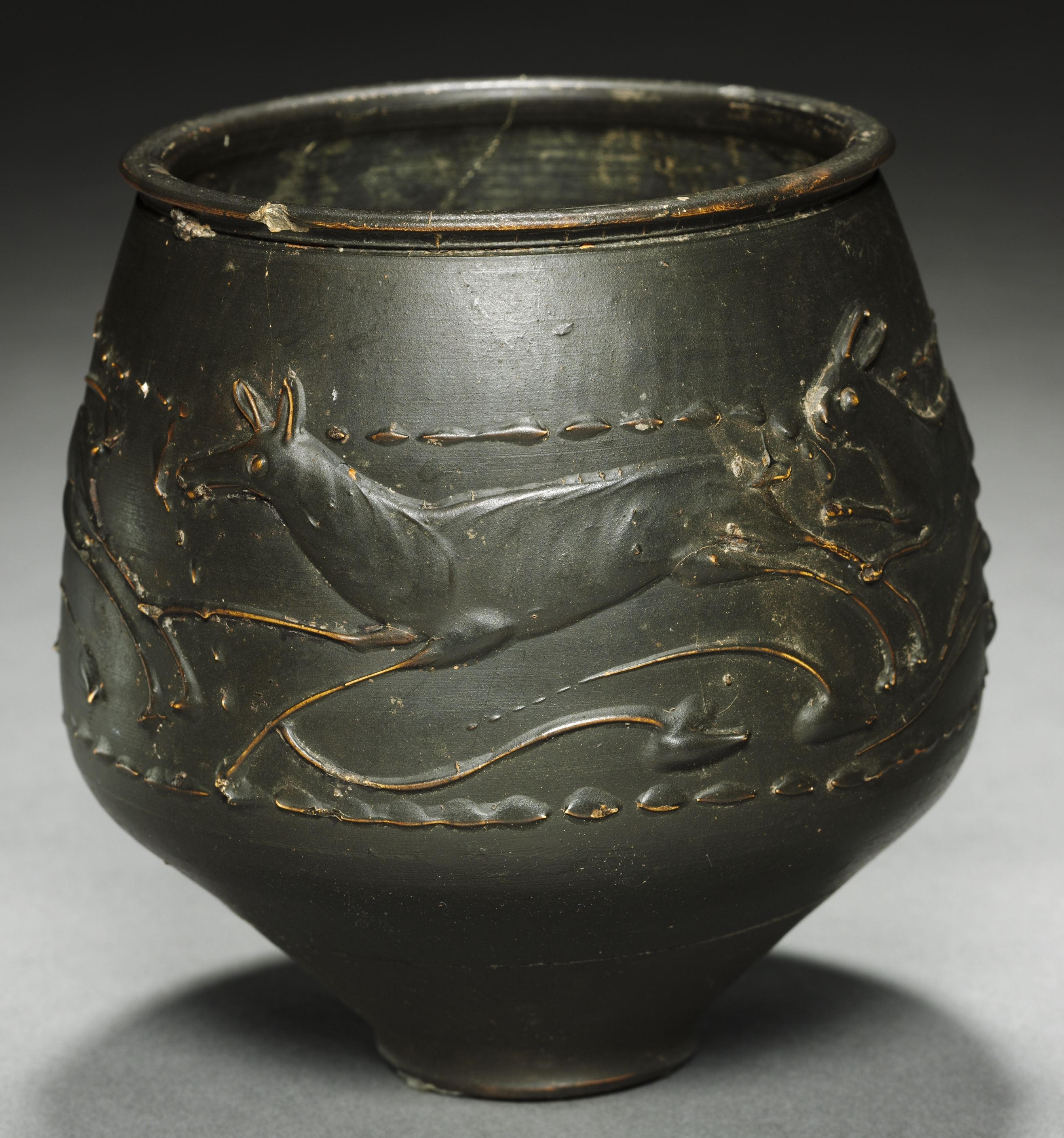
Gallo-Roman cup with type B barbotine or sprigged decoration

== A: Piped slip decoration ==
In the first, common from the Ancient World onwards, the barbotine is piped onto the object rather as cakes are decorated with icing, using a quill, horn, or other kind of nozzle. The slip would normally be in a contrasting colour to the rest of the vessel, and forms a pattern, or inscription, that is slightly raised above the main surface. This is normally called slip-trailing in English today, and for English pottery (such as the works of Thomas Toft, d. 1698), but "barbotine" remains common in archaeology.

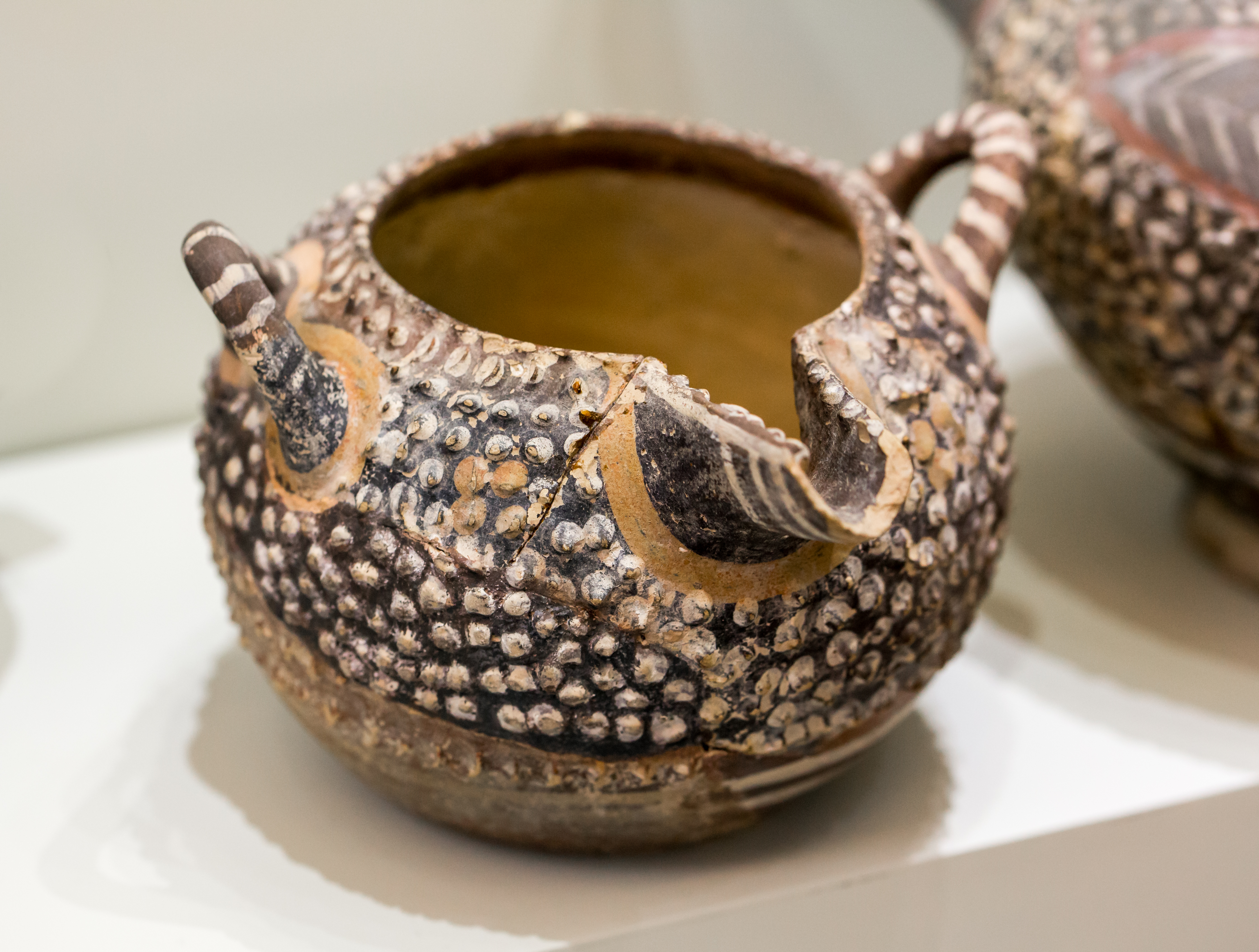
Kamares style Minoan spouted two-handled jar with barbotine treatment in the form of white prickles; polychrome painting on dark slip. Middle Minoan IB-IIA period - earlier Protopalatial (ca 1800 BC). From Kamares cave. Herakleion Archaeological Museum, Greece

The first barbotine technique in pottery styling was in use in the ancient world. The Egyptians were known to have used barbotine design. As another example, Middle Minoan pottery from Knossos on the island of Crete in present-day Greece includes a barbotine pottery style, and it is common in Ancient Roman pottery, where the colour may often be the same as the rest of the vessel.

== B: Slipcast sprigs ==
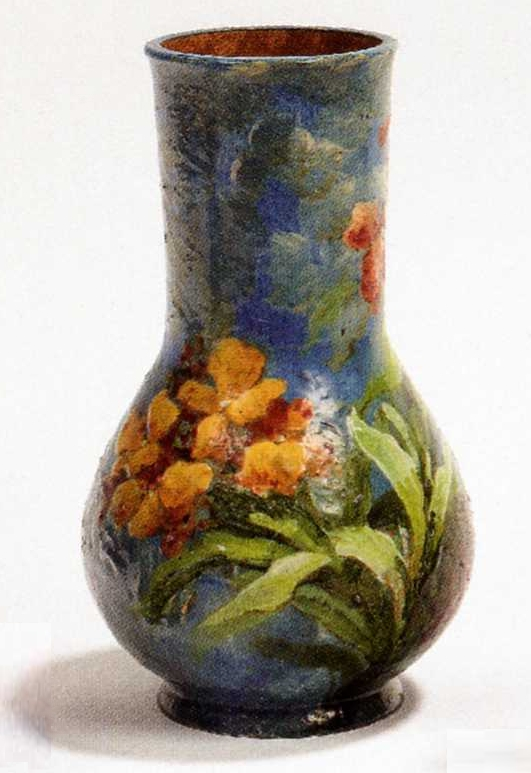
Type C painted vase by Eugène Schopin, France, late 19th century

The second technique is a term for slipcasting, "couler en barbotine" in French. "Barbotine pottery" is sometimes used for Ancient Roman as well as 19th-century French and American pottery with added slipcast decoration. Slip or barbotine is cast in moulds to form three-dimensional decorative sections which when dried out are added to the main vessel. Typically, these might be flowers, fruit, or small animals. Again, there is an alternative English term, Sprigging (pottery), which is normally used for English pottery, for example in Wedgwood's Jasperware, where the sprigs are in contrasting colours.

== C: Slip-painting ==
The third sense of the term describes a technique developed by Ernest Chaplet, the secret of which was later sold by him to Haviland & Co. This was a method of painting art pottery in brightly coloured slips, in French also called peinture à la barbotine or in gouache vitrifiable. In this type there may be some impasto, but the decoration is essentially close to the surface. The term "Barbotine ware" also describes the American art pottery that emulated the Haviland pottery, which made a great impression at the 1876 Philadelphia Centennial Exposition. In America this led to the technique sometimes being called "Limoges ware", Haviland being a large maker of Limoges porcelain. In fact all their barbotine wares were made at their factory in Auteuil, near Paris.

The technique and term were less frequently used in England, although the technique was used, typically for floral paintings, by potteries including the Watcombe Pottery and the Bretby Art Pottery.

This sense of the term entered English via French potteries such as Sèvres and the Haviland Company of Limoges, who used it to describe their pottery in the second half of the 19th century. The precise technique varied between ceramicists. Some applied the coloured slips to unfired greenware, others to fired pots. On darker clay bodies an overall light coat of slip was often applied first.

== See also ==
- Minoan pottery
- Samian ware
