= Samuel Schellink =

Dutch painter

- Born: 1 August 1876; Utrecht, Netherlands
- Died: 20 December 1958 (aged 82); The Hague, Netherlands
- Known for: pottery painter, engraver, aquarellist
- Movement: Art Nouveau

Samuel Schellink (1 August 1876 – 20 December 1958) was a Dutch pottery decorator, painter, engraver, ceramist, pastelist, and author of watercolors and gouaches. His active period was between 1891 and 1958.

== Work ==
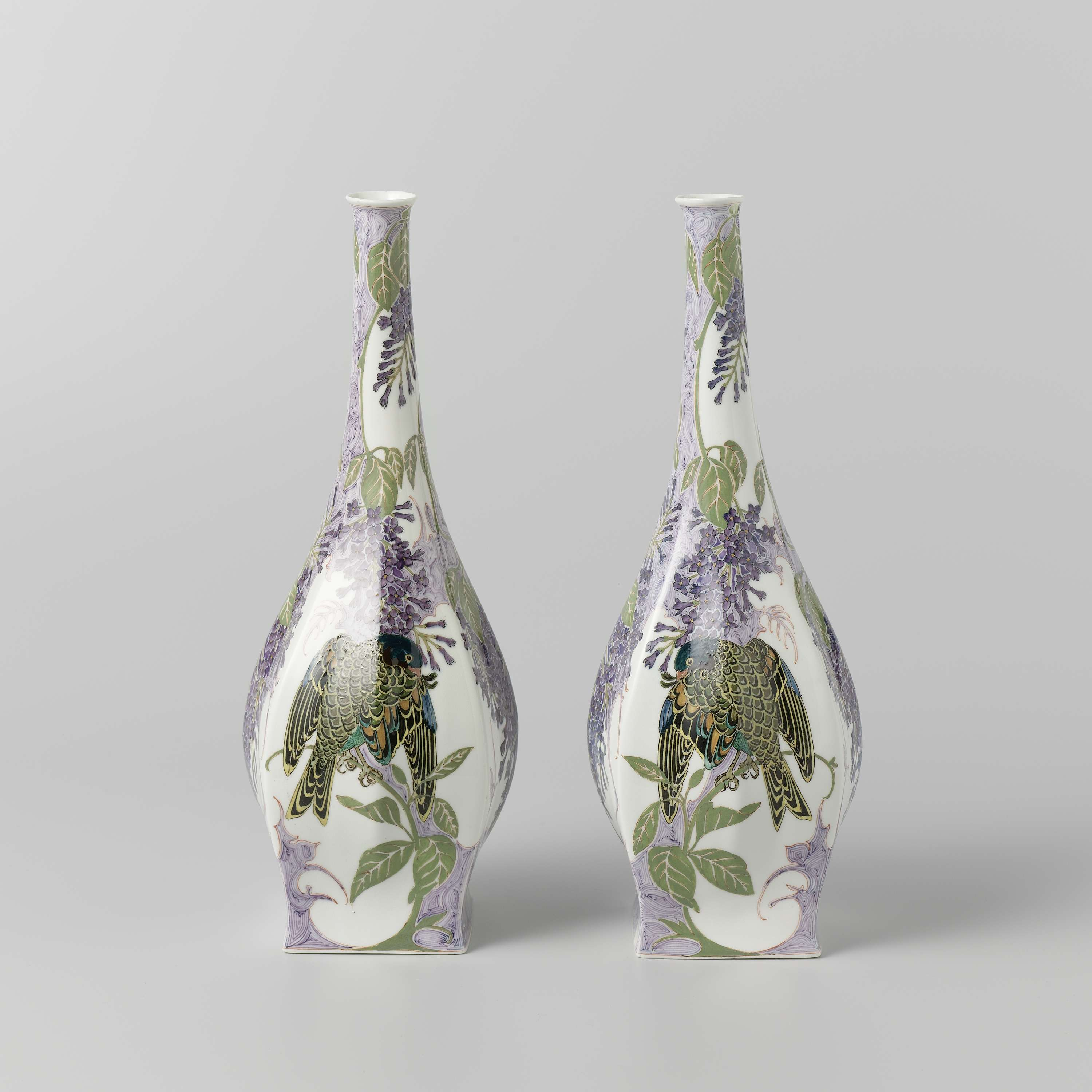
Porcelain vase decorated by Schellink in 1914, currently at the Rijksmuseum Amsterdam

Sam Schellink (alias J. Schelling, Sam Schellink, or Schellink Junior) was an autodidact and began his career in Utrecht, where he worked until 1892, when he moved to The Hague. In that same year, he joined N.V. Haagsche Plateelbakkerij Rozenburg as a painter apprentice. He would later go on to be the painter of their eggshell porcelain, for which he would become well-known. During this time, he developed the signature topics of his work which include still life, flowers, birds and, less prominently, landscapes. He remained with Rozenburg until 1914, when they went bankrupt.

As a consequence and for a brief period, he focused on painting and entering the art trade. However, in 1918, he joined Tegel en Fayencefabriek Amphora in Oegstgeest, where he again worked as a pottery painter. Schellink's last employer was Plateelbakkerij Goedewaagen in Gouda, where he fulfilled the same role of pottery decorator.

== Personal life ==
In 1901, he married Johanna Sophia Bruens in The Hague, with whom he had a daughter. After the death of his first wife in 1927, he married Wilhelmina Gerardina Johanna Smits, who had been his housekeeper.

== Mentions in literature ==
- Scheen 1969-1970
- Scheen 1981, p. 457 (as: Schellink, Samuel ('Sam')*)
- Jacobs 2000, vol. 5, p. 290 (as: Schellink, Samuel (Sam))
- J. Romijn, 'Rozenburg en Sam Schellink', newsletter of the Vrienden van de Nederlandse Ceramiek nr. 51, 1968, p. 31-34
