= Pierre Félix Masseau =

French sculptor

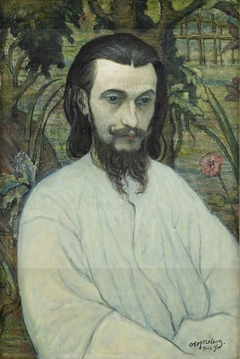
Portrait of Pierre Félix Masseau by Olof Sager-Nelson 1895.

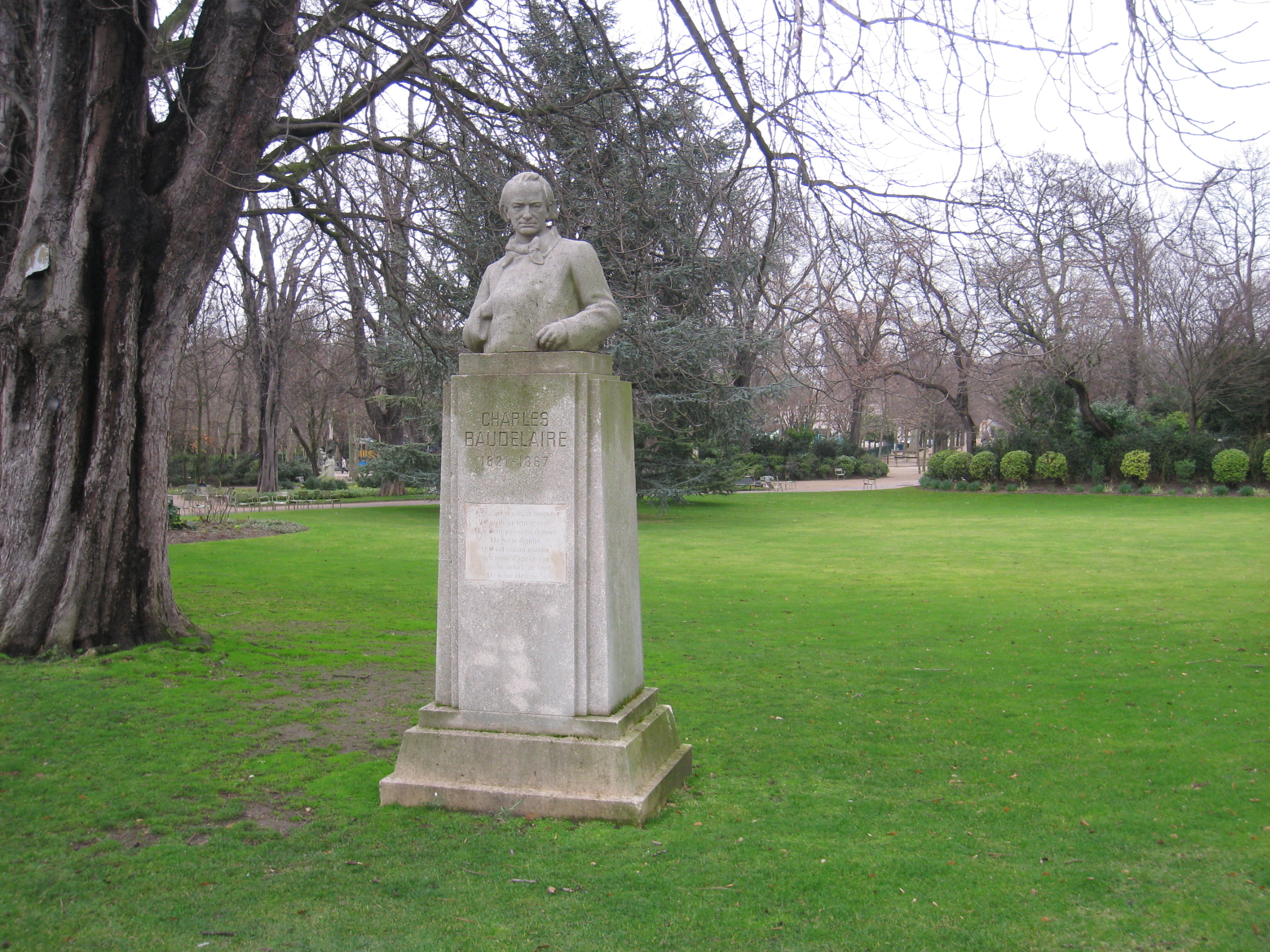
Bust of Charles Baudelaire, by Pierre Félix Masseau.

Pierre Félix Masseau (17 March 1869, in Lyon – 14 April 1937, in Paris), known professionally as Fix-Masseau. He was a noted French sculptor and father of poster artist Pierre Fix-Masseau with whom he is sometimes confused.

Fix-Masseau was born in Lyon. He studied sculpture in Dijon, then in Lyon as a student of Charles Dufraine, continuing his studies at the École des Beaux-Arts in Paris under the supervision of Gabriel Jules Thomas. In 1897 he was awarded the Prix de Paris which allowed him to travel to the Netherlands, Switzerland, and also to Belgium and Italy (eight months in Florence).

Fix-Masseau set up his workshop in Paris where he attracted the admiration of Rodin. The latter was unable to convince him to join his studio. The quality of his sculptures was noticed during the salons of the society of fine arts at the end of the 19th century. It made him a recognized and respected artist by his style and his technical mastery in various material bronze, original patinas, wood, glass, and stone ware. His early art was part of the Symbolism movement, a precursor of the Art Nouveau with often feminine themes. An original character of his (a "Mephistophelian" look), being almost reclusive in his art, Fix-Masseau is the very image of the total artist, mystical, focussed and concentrated.

The 1890s and the 1900s were his most creative phase. In the 1890s he created some of his most notable art works. In 1894 Le Sécret a tall female mystical figure, holding up a box, her face receded almost behind it, like her naked body under a half opened coat. The figure is now at the Musée d'Orsay, copies exist in bronze. From the same year is L'emprise, which was first presented as in plaster at the Salon de la Société Nationale des Beaux-Arts in 1894. It shows a young woman as a personification of the human soul appearing to be haunted by five heads personifying passions: lust, anger, greed, attachment, and vanity. Both bronzes became key works of the Symbolism movement.

He is also well known for his portraits as busts or masks, in bronze, marble, plaster, and ceramic. They are characterized by lively sculpted surface, close to Rodin's style. Most noticeable is his bust of Beethoven, 1902. The original bronze is housed in the Beethoven House in Bonn.

He worked in different styles and media. In his paintings, he experimented successfully with impressionism. Most notably is his "Aprés le dejeuner", depicting a mother and a child sitting in a sun-lit garden. Most of his known paintings, however, are decorative stilllifes of flowers, vases, and hunting prey.

He formed part of the French decorative art movement, the arts decoratifs, creating numerous decorative objects in various positions holding different attributes. These decorative items graced many livings rooms of the well-to-do at the time. Less known is his co-operation with ceramists, such as Alexandre Bigot (1862-1927) and Edmond Lachenal (1855-1848). Fix-Masseau created also vases (pewter), plates (stoneware), clocks (with F. Barbedienne), and chandeliers in the Art Nouveau style, exhibited numerous works at the Salon des Artistes Francais and the Société Nationale des Beaux-Arts.

At Herqueville, his residence outside Paris in the Normandy, he befriended Louis Renault, the famous car engineer and pioneering entrepreneur. After the Great War, Fix-Masseau was the first sculptor to create a celebratory statuette of a tank, the Renault F 17, highlighting the age of the machines in war, which was previously only allegorized with male nudes with swords and classicizing depictions of the female Victoria.

Since 1908 until 1935, he served as director of the École Nationale d'Art Décoratif in Limoges, and was appointed curator at the Musée Adrien Dubouché. In 1926, he was made an officer of the Légion d'honneur. Between 1904 and 1920 he was a member of the Societé des artistes français.

His style changed after WWI to the more austere and reductionist forms of the art déco in difference to his earlier works in exuberant Art Nouveau. While still producing high quality works, he lost his avant-garde status. In his later years, he produced a number of masks and busts for Frédéric Chopin and Charles Baudelaire, as well as numerous medals mostly as commissions for notable Parisian physicians of his time.

His works are found among other institutions in the Musée d'Orsay, in the Petit Palais in Paris, in the Musée des Beaux-Arts in Lyon and in the Albertinum in Dresden.

== Selected works ==
- Musée d'Orsay
  - Le Secret, 1894, 76x 17,5 cm x 18 c, statuette of mahogany, ivory, bronze cast at Siot-Decauville foundry
  - Masque d' Edmond Lachenal, 1890, terra cotta, Paris (1982 gifted by the son of Pierre Fix-Masseau)
  - Réflexion, 1900, bronze mask
  - Buste de Jan Van Herwijnen, 1924, marble
  - Restoration and cast of the 36 busts of the Célébrités du Juste milieu by Honoré Daumier, 1927
  - Intérieur, oil painting, 61.5x50.5 cm
- Elsewhere
  - Buste de Charles Baudelaire, 1936, Paris, Jardin du Luxembourg
  - Buste d' Auguste Delaherche; Beauvais, Musée départemental de l'Oise
  - Buste d' Anna de Noailles
  - Méditation - Monsieur le Penseur; Lyon, Musée des Beaux-Arts
  - Beethoven, 1902, bronze bust, since October 2001 placed in the courtyard of the Beethoven Haus „Im Mohren“, Bonngasse 18, Bonn
  - Renault Tank type FT17, before 1922, bronze, 20 cm
- Medals
  - Medal for Henri Albert Hartmann, professor at the Hopital Bichat 1909
  - Medal for Paul Lecène
  - Medal for Henri Bourgeois
  - Medal for Jules Auclair
  - Medal for Louis Dupuy-Dutemps
  - Medal for Charles Baudelaire
  - Medal for Frédéric Chopin

== Gallery ==
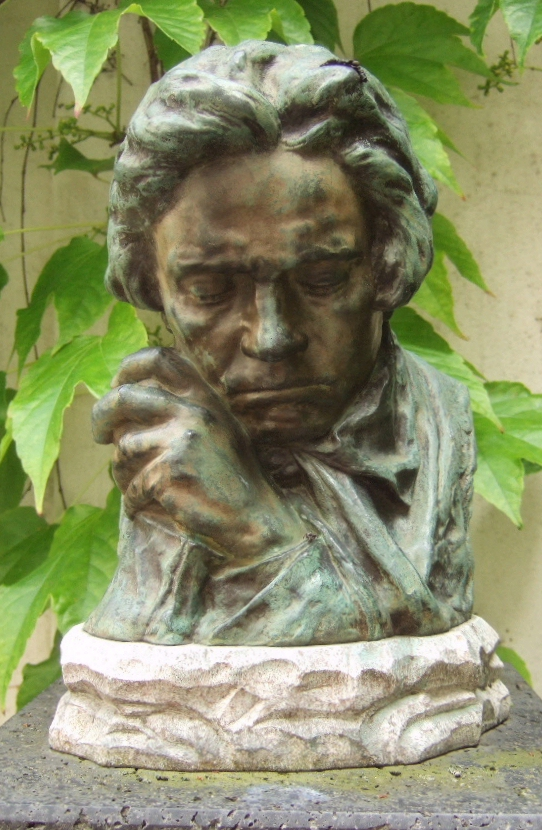
Beethoven, Fix-Masseau 1902, Bonn, in the house „Im Mohren“, Bonngasse 18

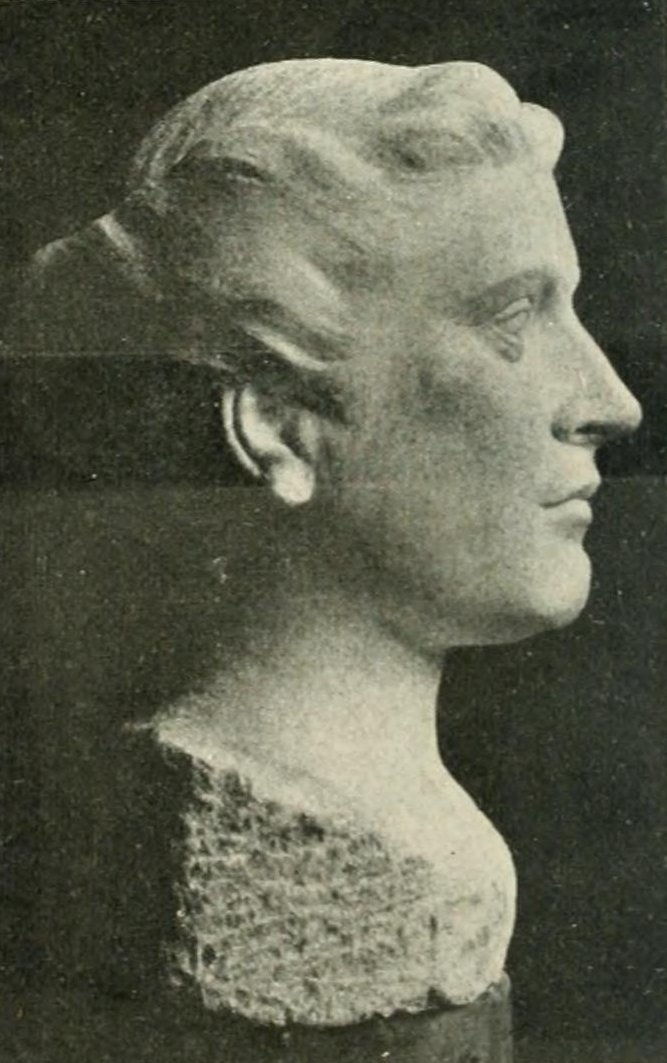
Jeanne Hatto sculpture Fix-Masseau, 1907

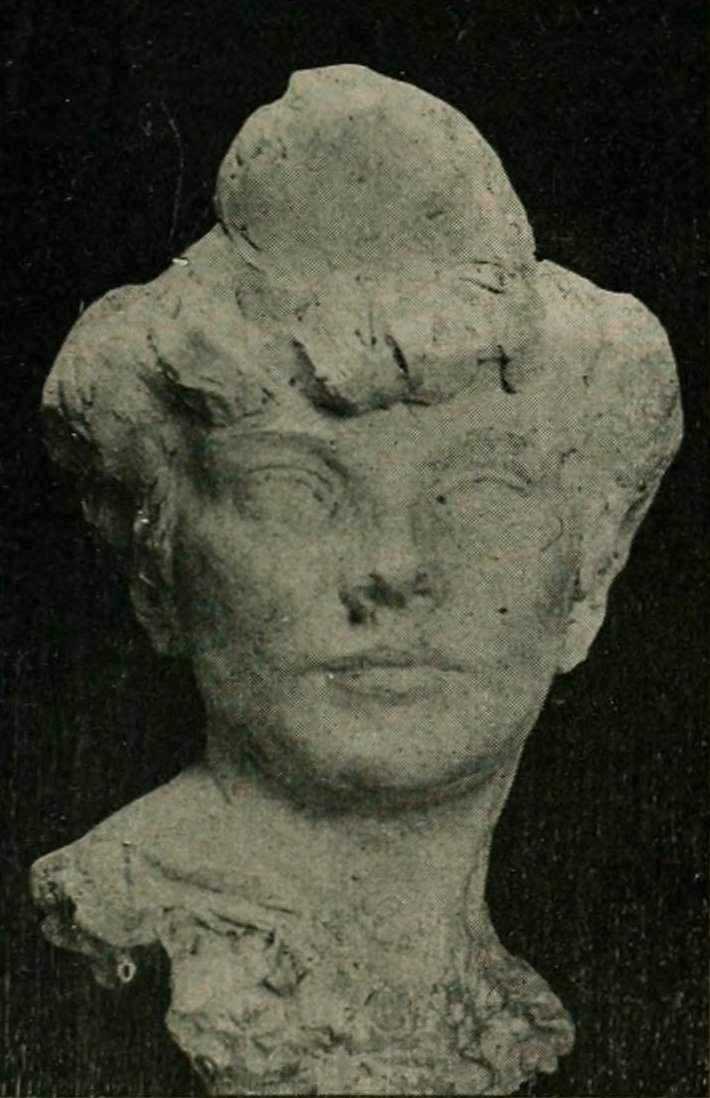
Apachina sculpture Fix-Masseau, 1906

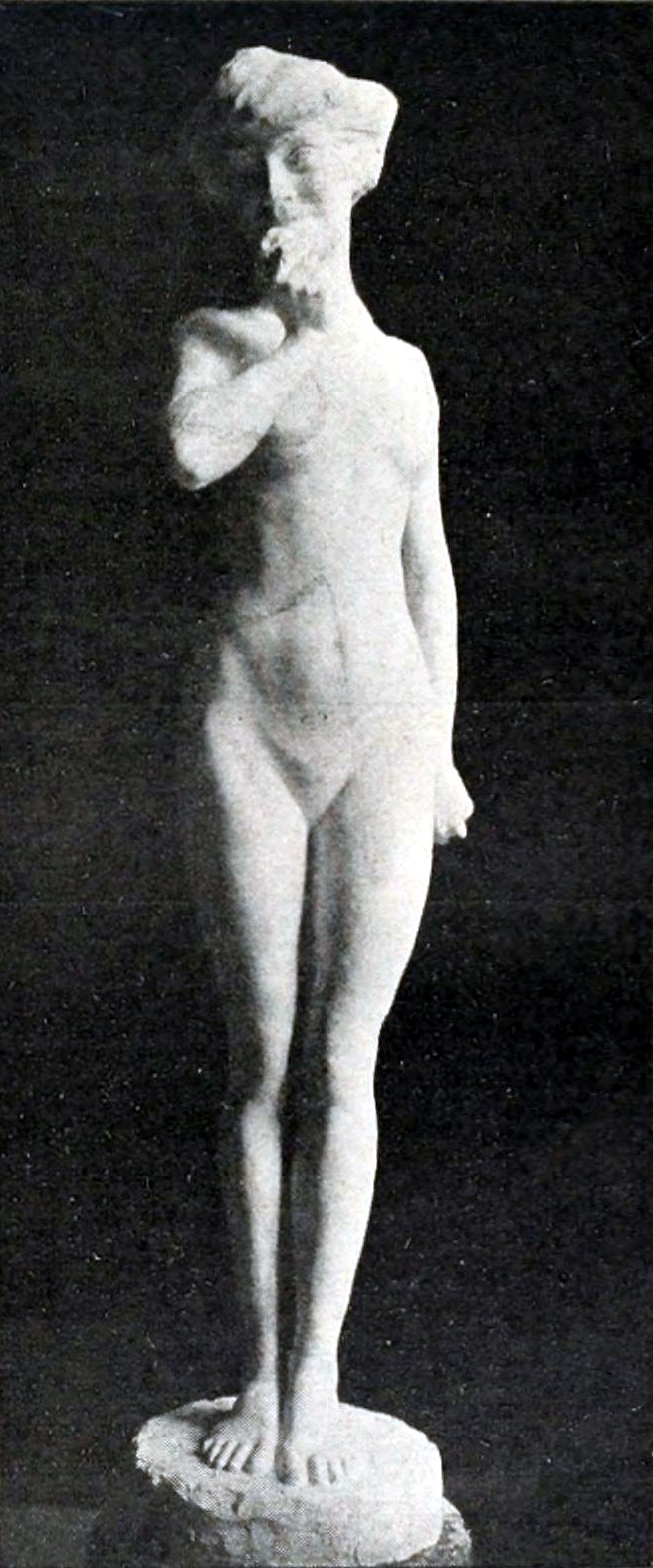
Petite fille d'Eve sculpture Fix-Masseau, 1907

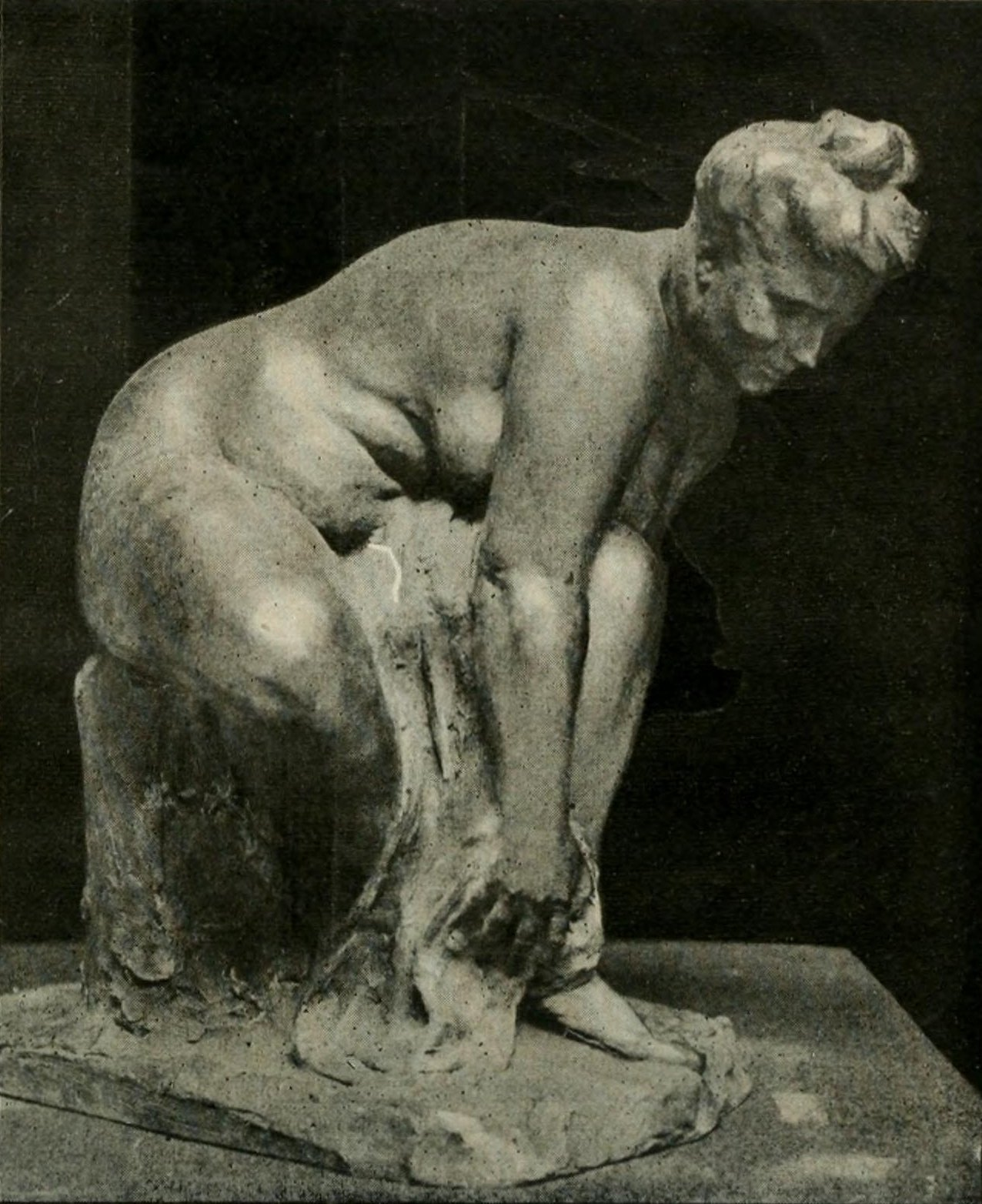
Femme s'essuyant sculpture Fix-Masseau, 1905

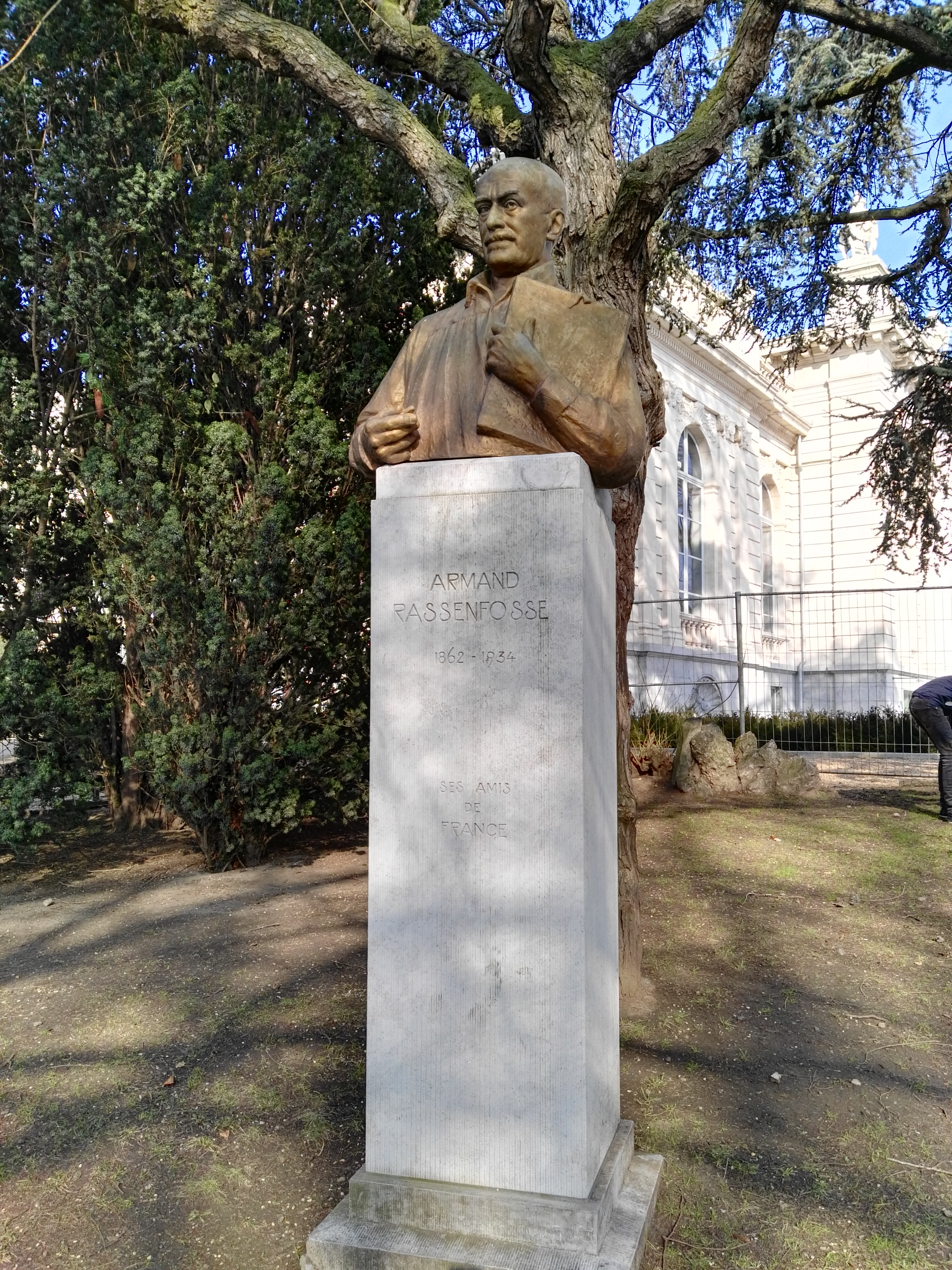
Monument for Armand Rassenfosse (1934), Liège.

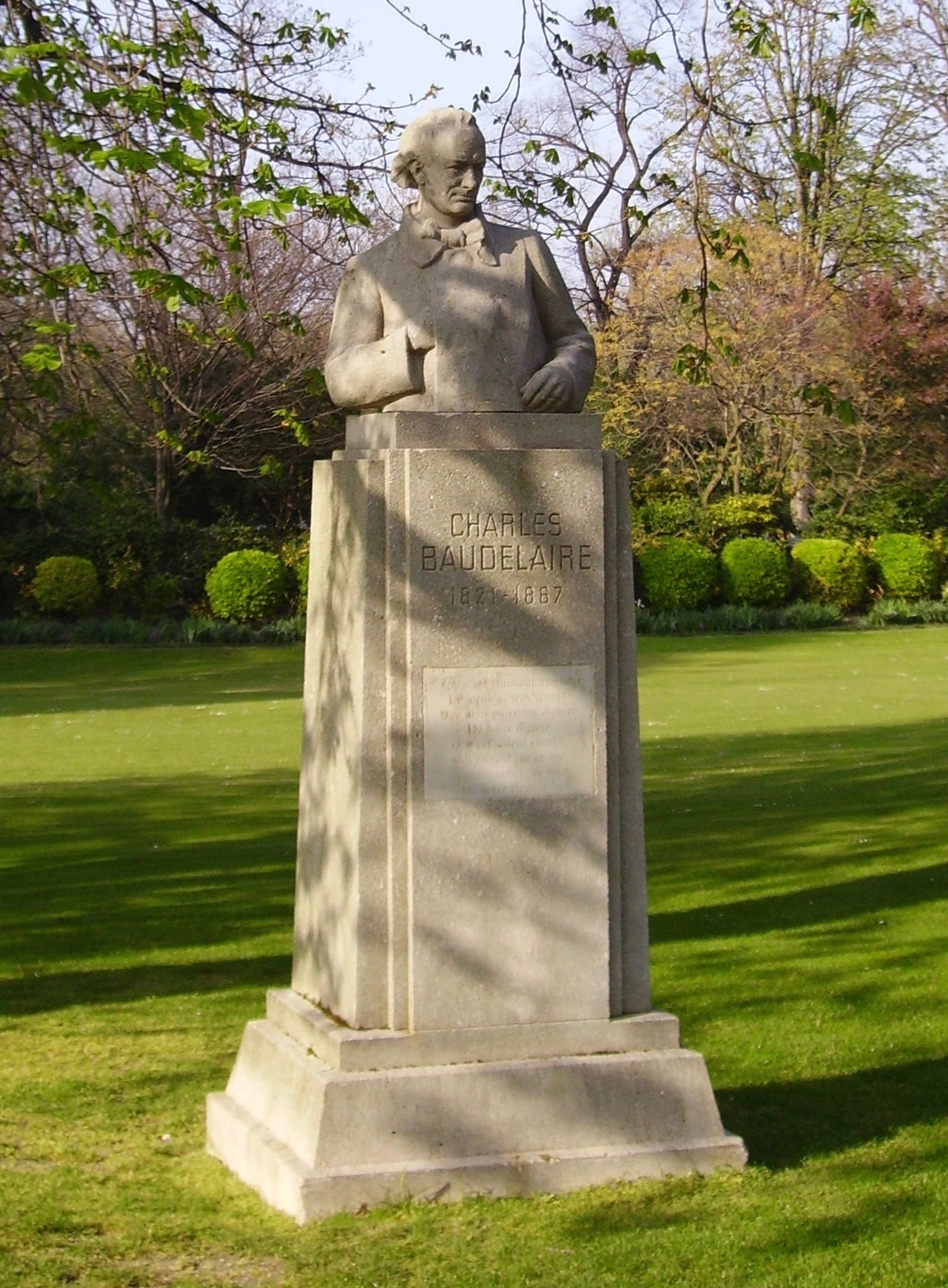
Monument for Charles Baudelaire (1936), Paris, jardin du Luxembourg.
