= Auguste Delaherche =

French artist and ceramist

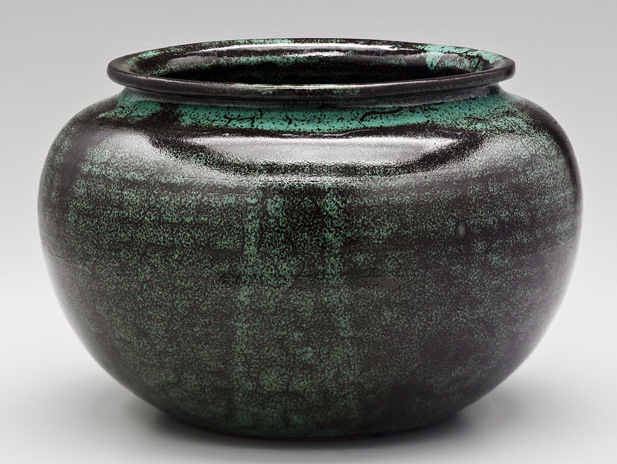
Low vase, stoneware, 1905, 17.5 × 26 cm, 3.4 kg

Auguste Delaherche (27 December 1857 – 27 June 1940) was a French ceramicist, who was a leading figure in French art pottery through the Art Nouveau period. Like other leading French potters of the period, he was intensely interested in ceramic glaze effects of colour and surface texture. He began his career making stoneware, but later also made porcelain in his studio.

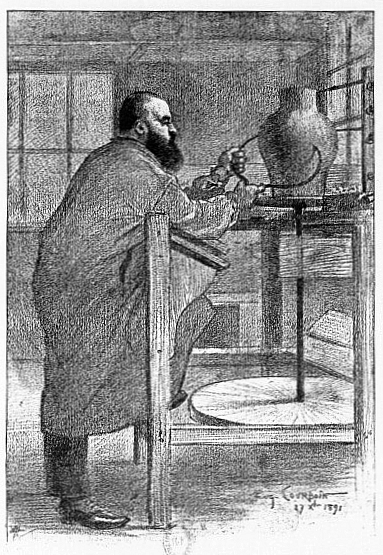
Print of Delaherche at work in 1891

After some years potting in Paris, in 1894 he returned to his native region, and ten years later changed his operation to a one-man studio pottery. He also moved in stages from making exclusively stoneware to only making porcelain.

== Career ==
He trained at the École des Arts Décoratifs in Paris. At the start of his career he worked in other artistic media, restoring stained glass, designing "religious jewellery" and as head of the electroplating department at the firm of Christofle in Paris, who had pioneered the technique. He began potting with salt-glazed stoneware in 1883 near Beauvais, and in 1887 bought the atelier of Ernest Chaplet in rue Blomet, Paris. Chaplet had moved to Choisy-le-Roi in the suburbs.

Initially he made stoneware pieces in several versions, and did not do the throwing himself, giving drawings to assistants. His pieces were almost all vases of one sort or another. He preferred relatively simple basic shapes, often augmented with bold ribs or handles, concentrating on the surface effects, especially high-temperature "flambé" glazes. His work came to the notice of other potters at the exhibition held by the Union Centrale des Arts Décoratifs in 1887, and then won prizes at the Paris Exposition Universelle of 1889. He won gold medals at both, and the Exposition Universelle of 1900, again in Paris.

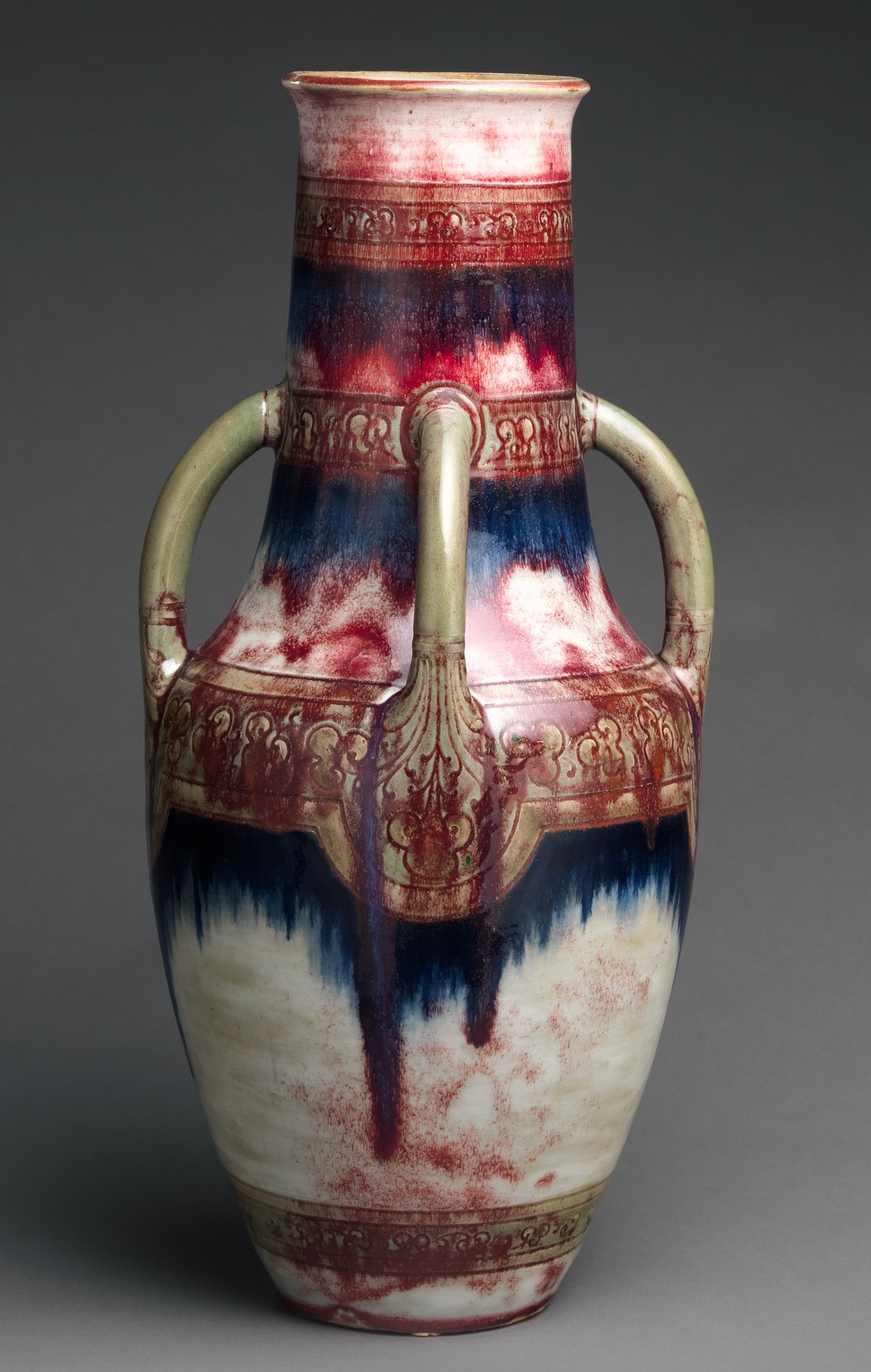
Vase with four green handles, stoneware, c. 1889

In 1894 he left Paris and set up his workshop at "Les Sables Rouges", in the hamlet of Armentières, Oise, near the village of Lachapelle-aux-Pots, and his hometown of Beauvais, and in the traditional stoneware potting district of the Pays de Bray. He was rarely seen in Paris thereafter, though his pieces continued to be sold at the top galleries there, and as a result he acquired in the Paris art scene something of a myth as a rural "hermit". He also began to make porcelain pieces.

In 1904 there was a major change in his way of working, as he became, in modern terms, a studio potter. He let go his assistants, and thereafter made unique pieces, mostly (and eventually all) in porcelain, carrying out all the stages of production himself. He was said to use clay dug from his own garden, and according to Bernard Leach, he only fired his kiln once a year, remaining awake for thirty hours to ensure the correct temperature was maintained. The former claim must only refer to stoneware, as the region's clay is very suitable for this, and it is where it was first made in France, but the clay lacks the kaolin needed for porcelain. Indeed, pottery clay was still being extracted commercially at Armentières in 1974.

He was created a "chevalier" of the Légion d'honneur in 1894, with the painter René Ménard as sponsor, and in 1920 promoted to "officier".

== Legacy ==
His bust by Pierre Félix Masseau is in the Musée départemental de l'Oise (MUDO) in Beauvais, which also claims to have the "most important" collection of his ceramics. The Musée de la Poterie de La Chapelle aux Pots has a collection. Other large museum collections have examples, especially in France, the United States, and Britain. One group assembled by the American collector, Ellen Dexter Sharpe (1861–1963), who corresponded with Delaherche, has mostly ended up in the Rhode Island School of Design Museum.

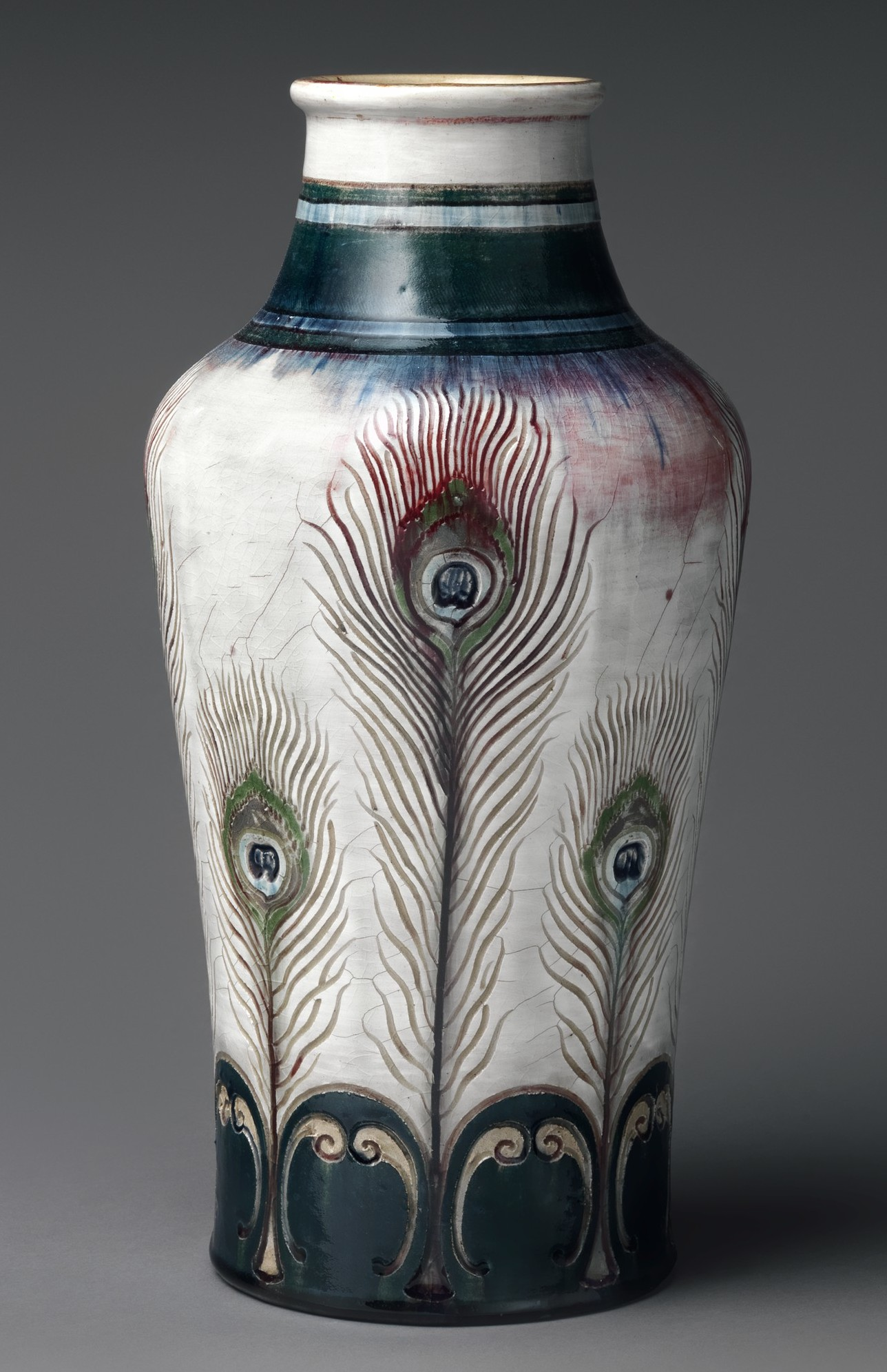
Vase with peacock feathers, stoneware, c. 1889

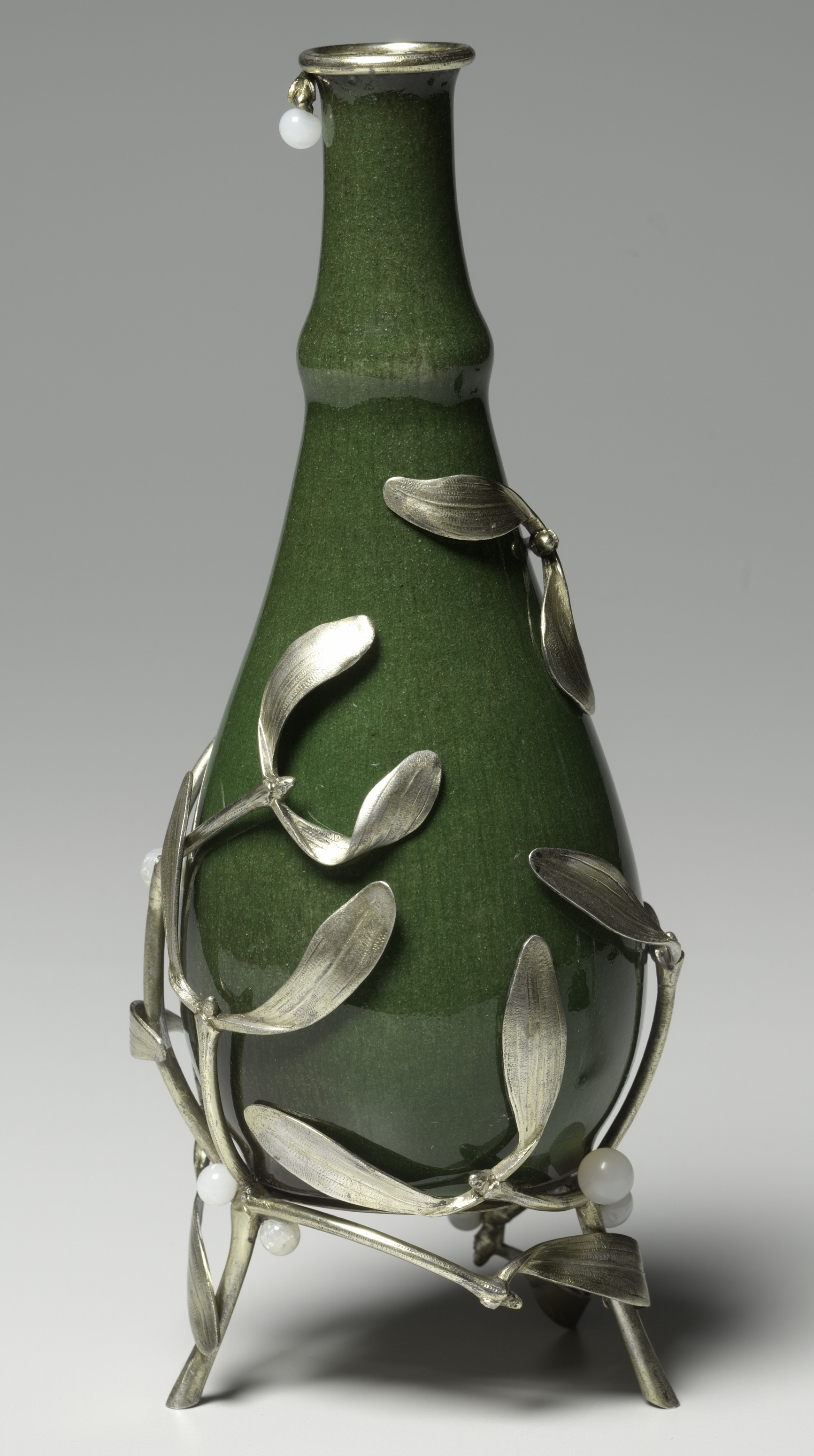
Stoneware vase: mistletoe with silver mounts and glass beads, 1890

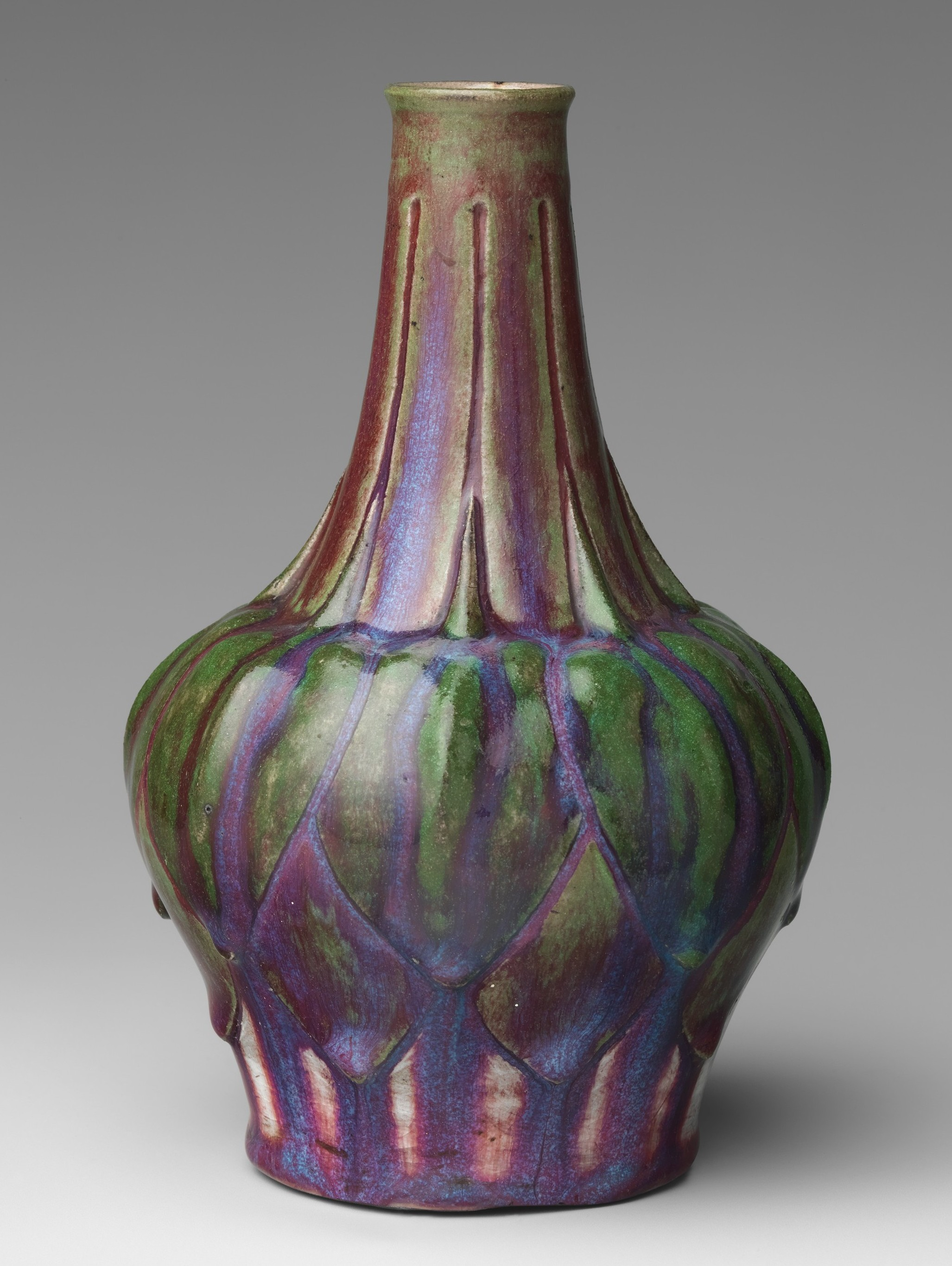
Vase, stoneware, c. 1890

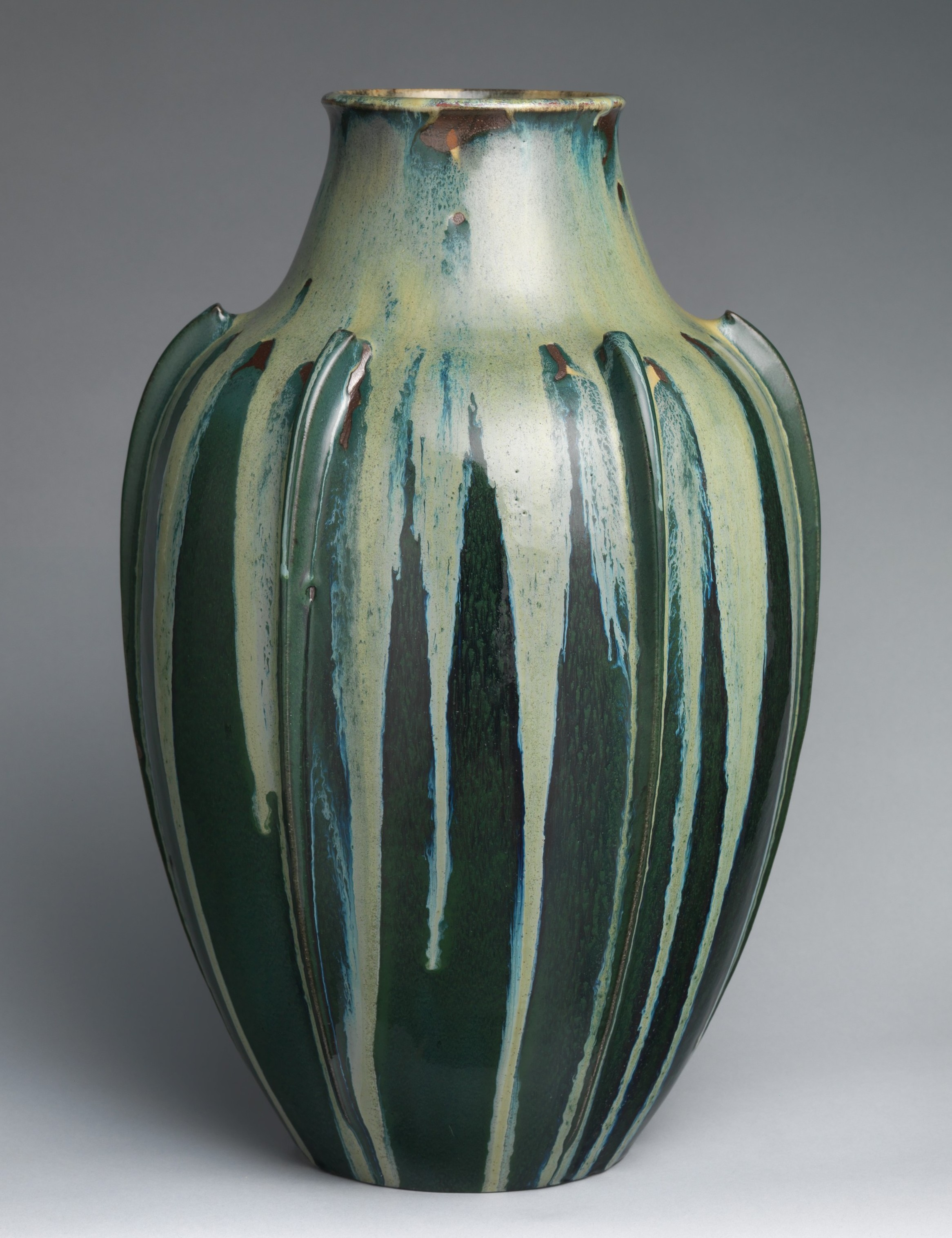
Vase, stoneware, c. 1890

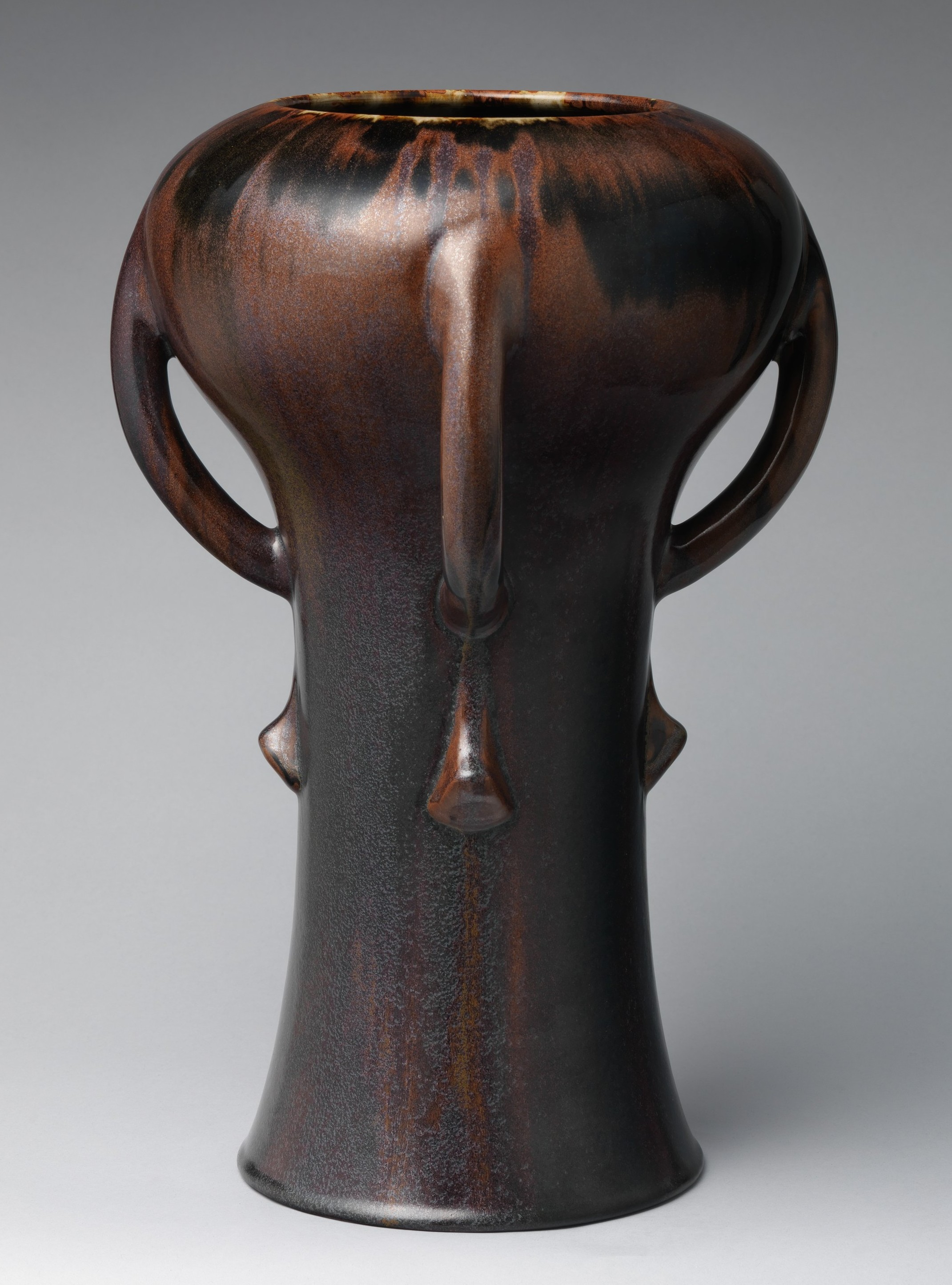
Vase, stoneware, c. 1893

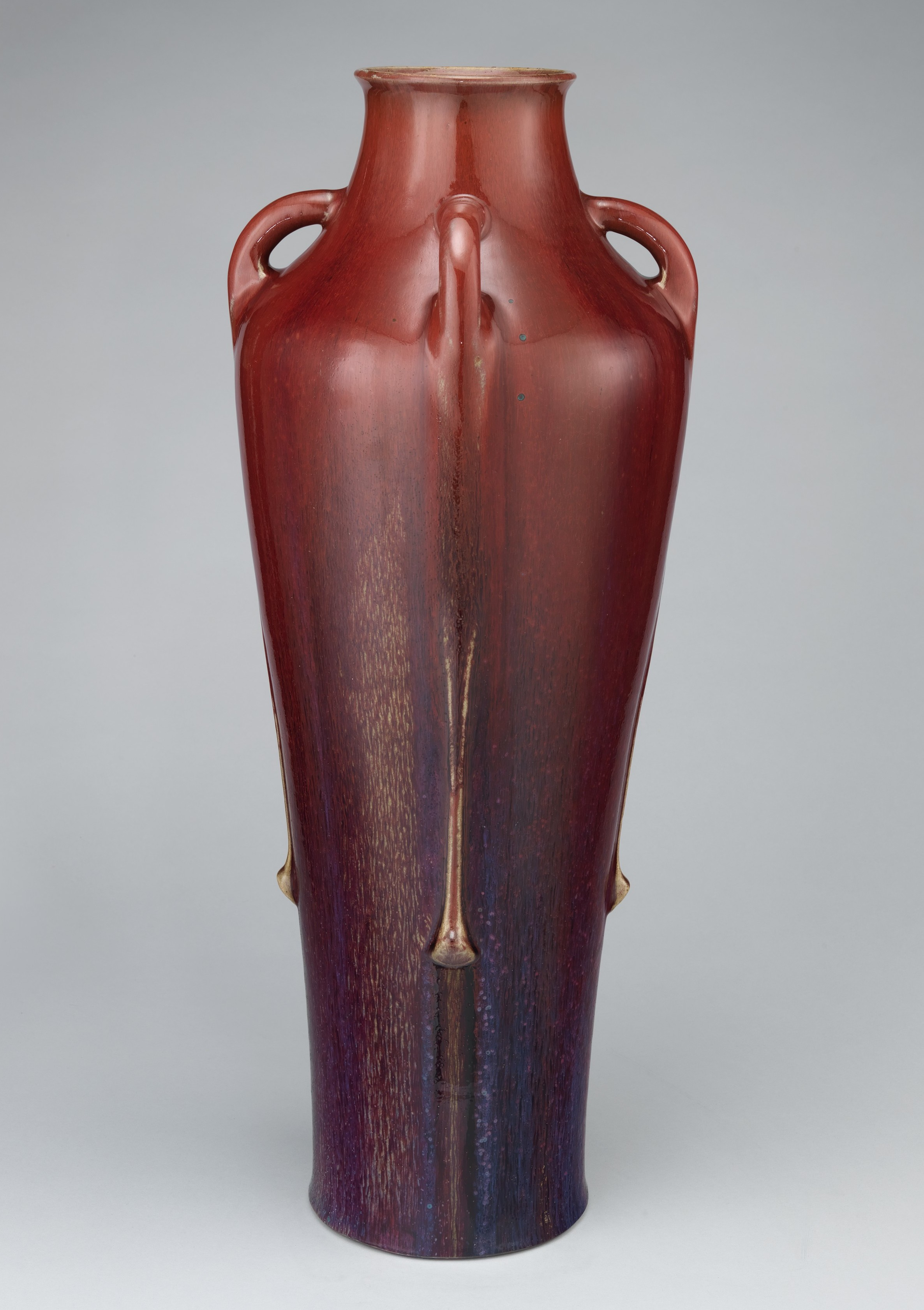
Vase, stoneware, sang de boeuf glaze, shape recorded in a sketchbook of 1893; 12 examples were made.

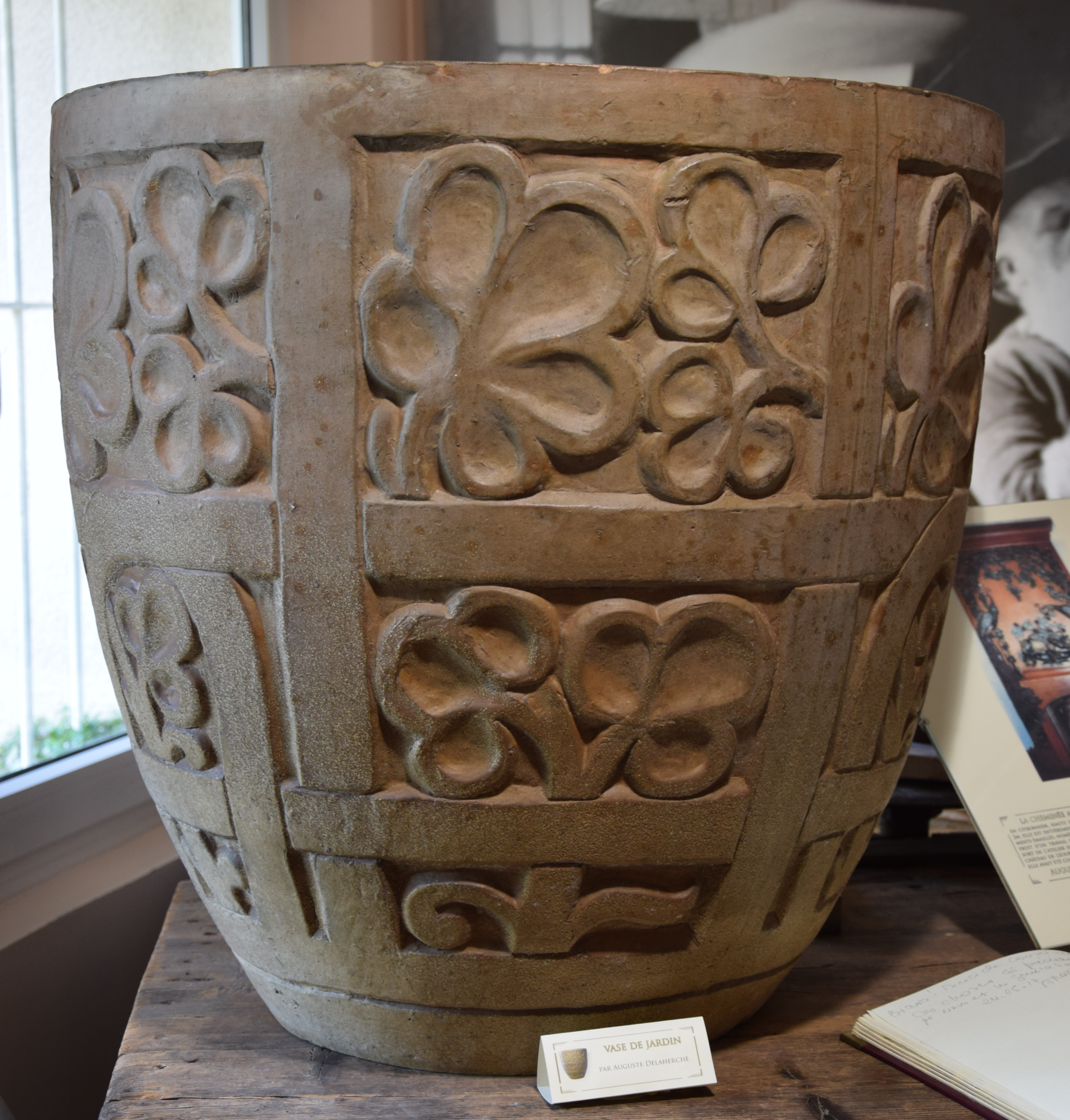
Garden vase, after 1894

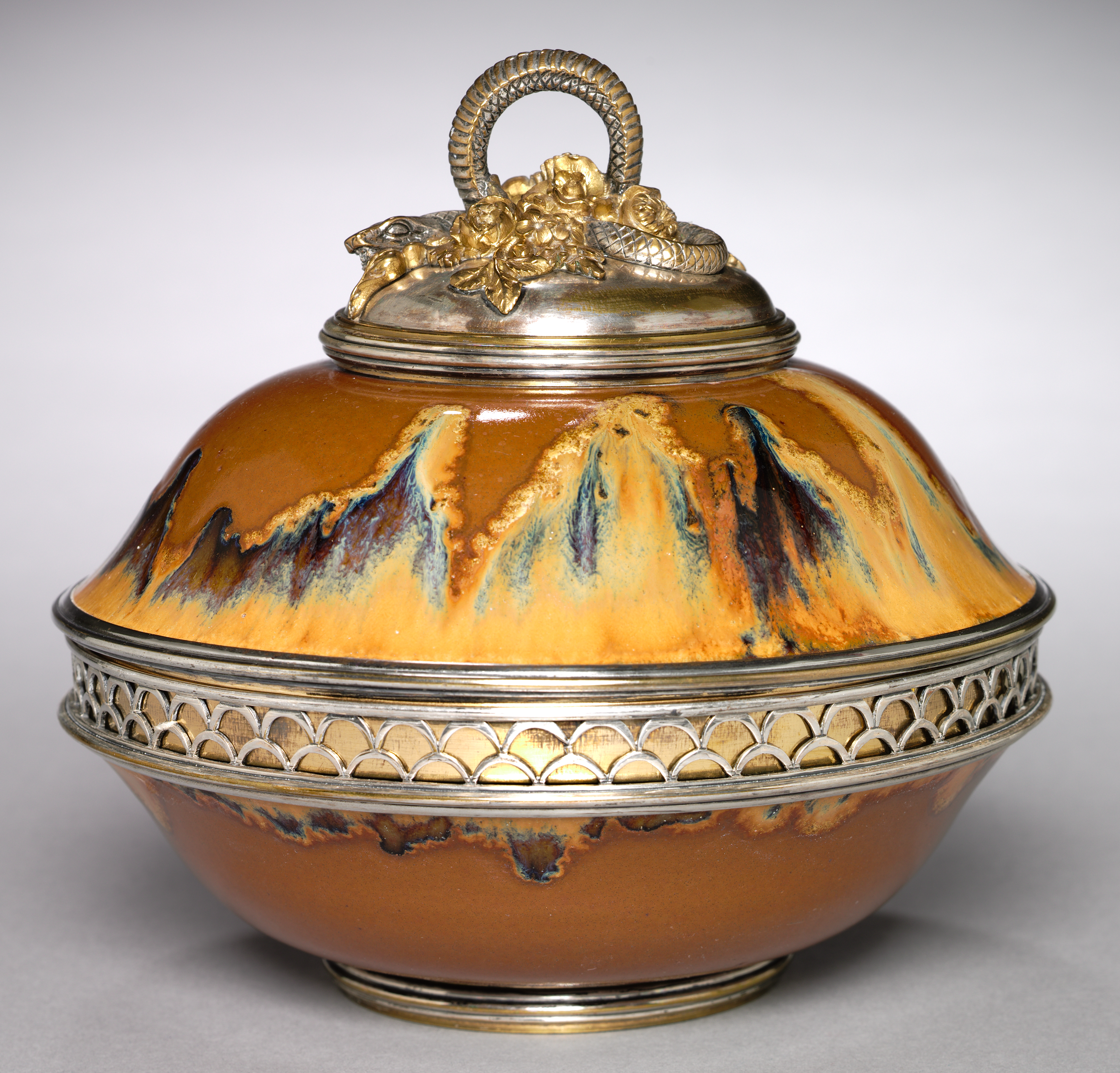
Covered stoneware bowl, with metal mounts, 1899–1900

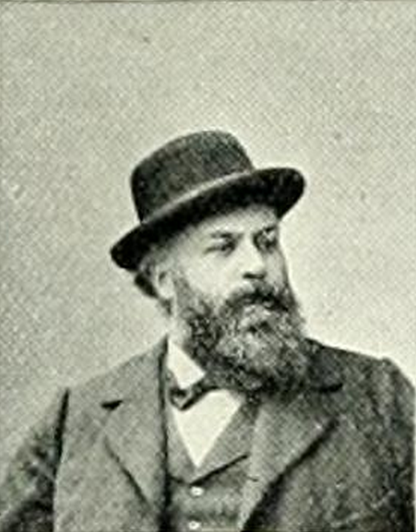
Photo published in 1900

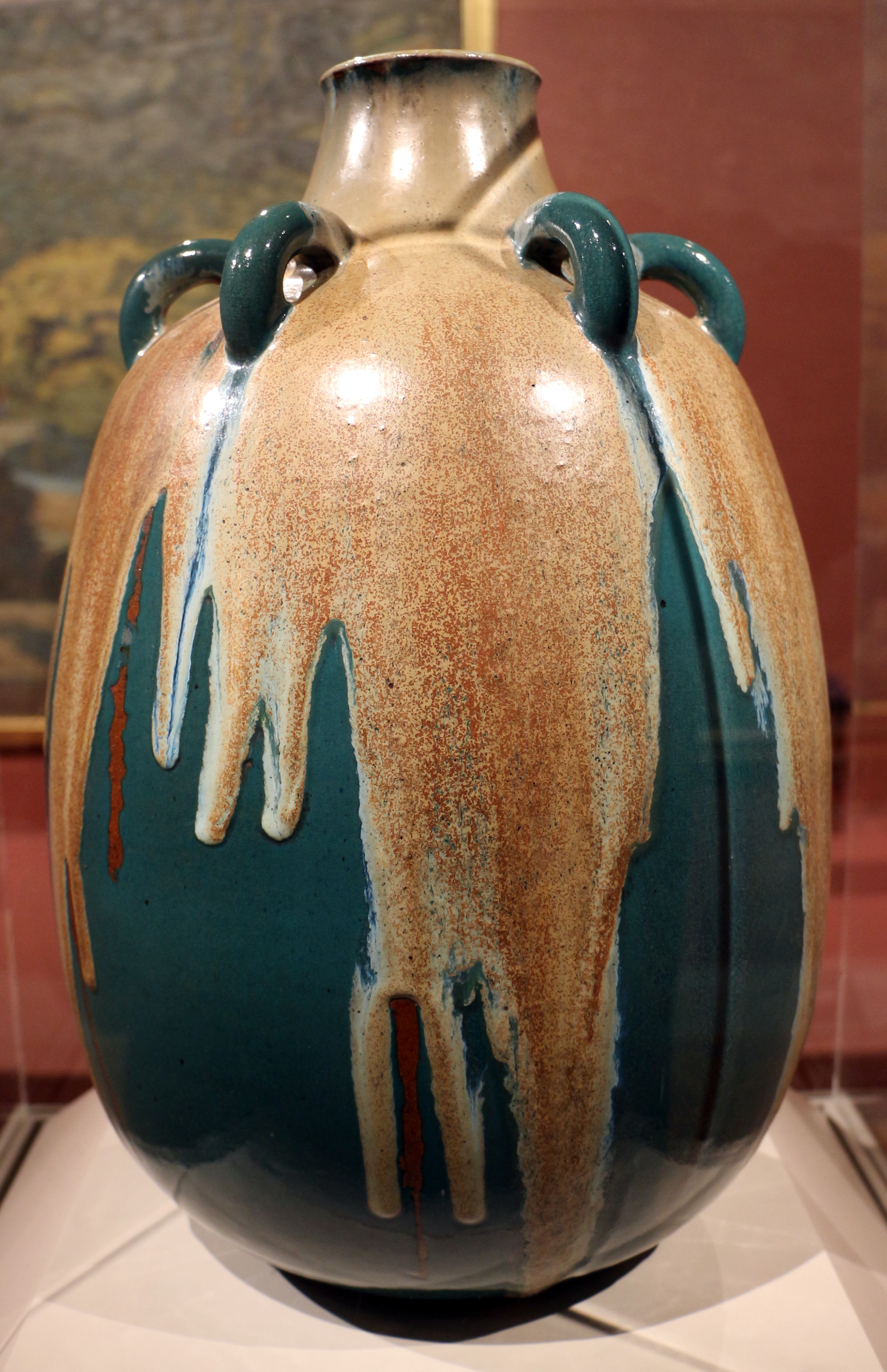
Vase, 1900

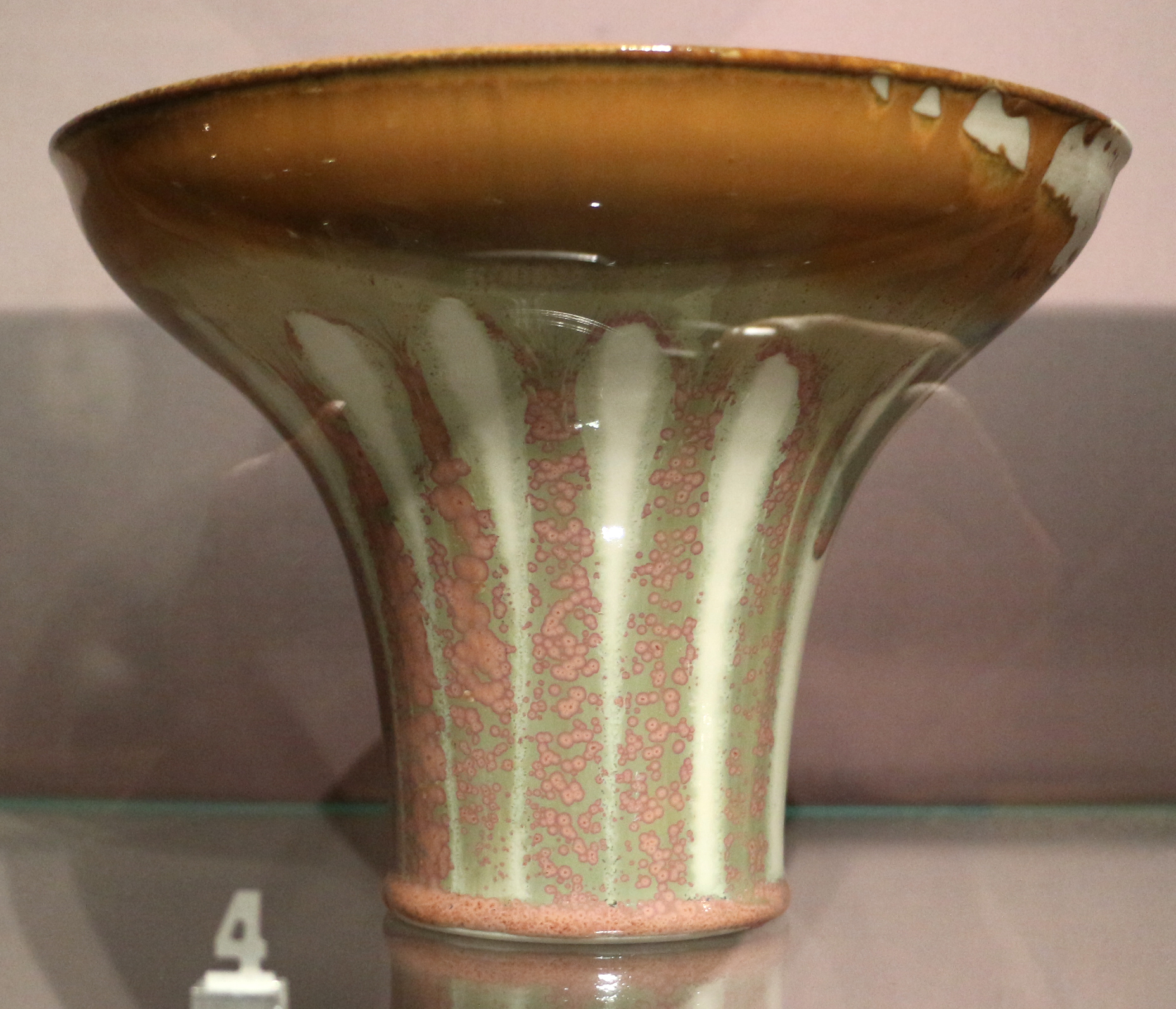
Porcelain cup, 1903
