= Olof Sager-Nelson =

Swedish painter

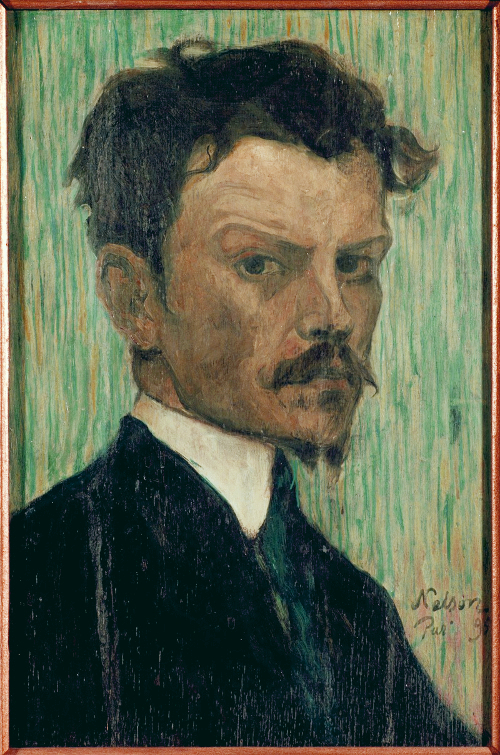
Self-portrait (1895)

Johan Olof Gudmund Sager-Nelson (13 September 1868, By Parish, Värmland - 11 April 1896, Biskra, Algeria) was a Swedish painter. Many of his works are in the Symbolist style.

== Biography ==
His mother, Emma Mathilda Sager (?-1873), was an amateur painter and illustrator. A few years after his mother's death, his father left him and fled to the United States after being convicted of embezzlement. He was then taken to Åmål, where he was raised by his grandmother and an aunt. After completing his primary education, he worked briefly for a printer, then for an equally brief time in an office.

In 1885, he went to Gothenburg to study engineering at Chalmers University of Technology in Gothenburg. There, he met the artist Johan Ericson and developed an interest in painting. In 1887, he quit before graduating. From 1888 to 1890, he was able to get art lessons from Bruno Liljefors at the Valand Academy. What he did immediately after is unknown, although he appears to have studied with Richard Bergh in Stockholm. Thanks to a recommendation from Carl Larsson, he was introduced to Pontus Fürstenberg, a patron of the arts who provided him with financial assistance.

In 1893, with his help, he was able to go to Paris. There, he was inspired by the works of Édouard Manet, James McNeill Whistler and Paul Gauguin. He was also able to attend the Académie Julian and study with Edmond Aman-Jean. It was then that he began using his hyphenated name. Later, he became associated with a group of Finnish Symbolist painters and formed a close friendship with Werner von Hausen. Between 1894 and 1895, inspired by Georges Rodenbach's novel Bruges-la-Morte, he spent time in Bruges painting cityscapes.

By the time he returned to Paris, it was obvious that he was in the advanced stages of tuberculosis. He then went to the resort city of Biskra, seeking a cure, but ended up being taken to the military hospital. He left there and died at the Hotel Terminus, aged only twenty-eight.

His works may be seen at the Nationalmuseum and the Göteborgs konstmuseum.

It is suspected that Sager-Nelson appears in the autobiographical novel, Venus Anadyomene by Emil Kléen, under the name "Richard Walter".

== Selected paintings ==
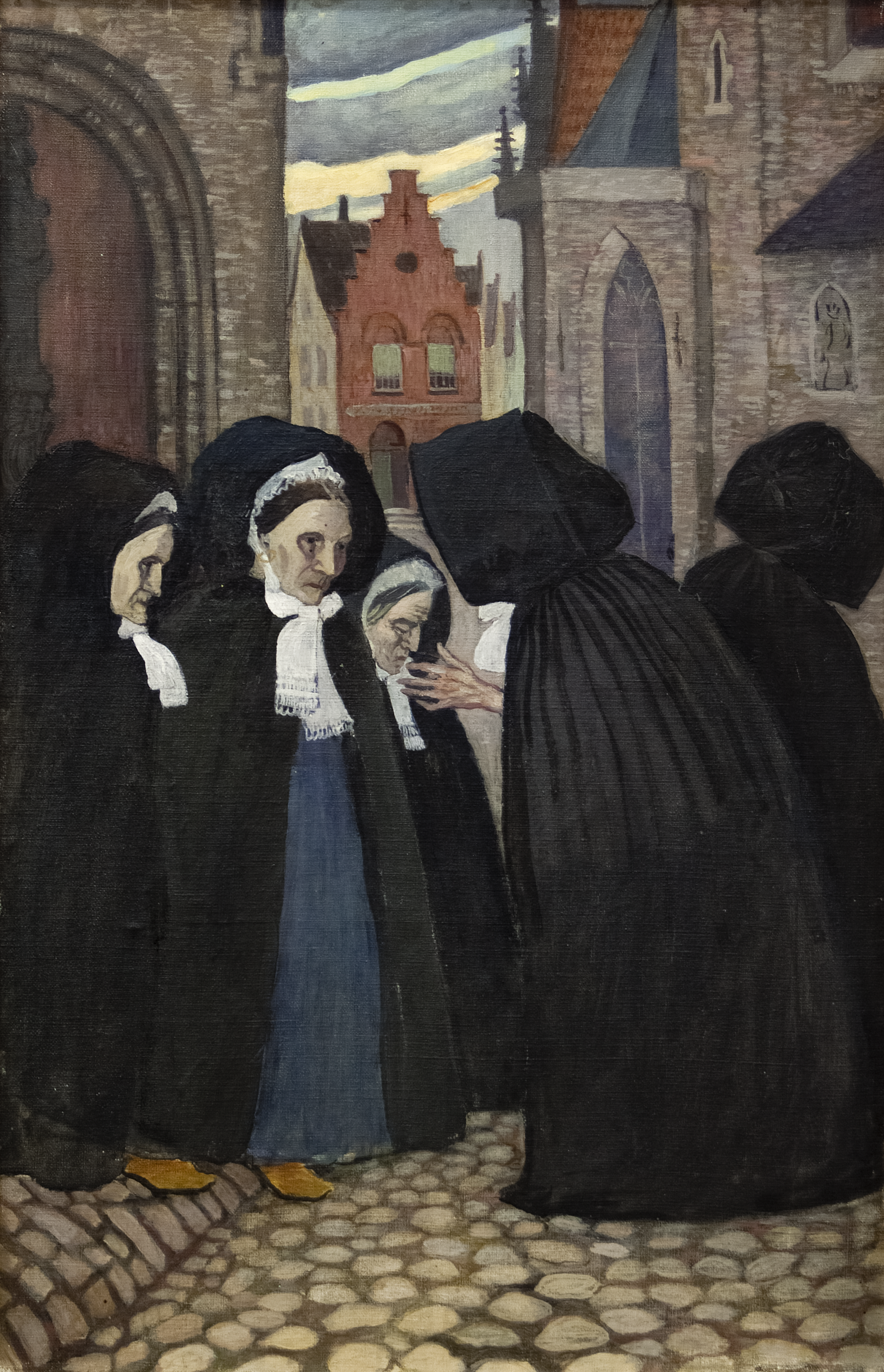
Bruges

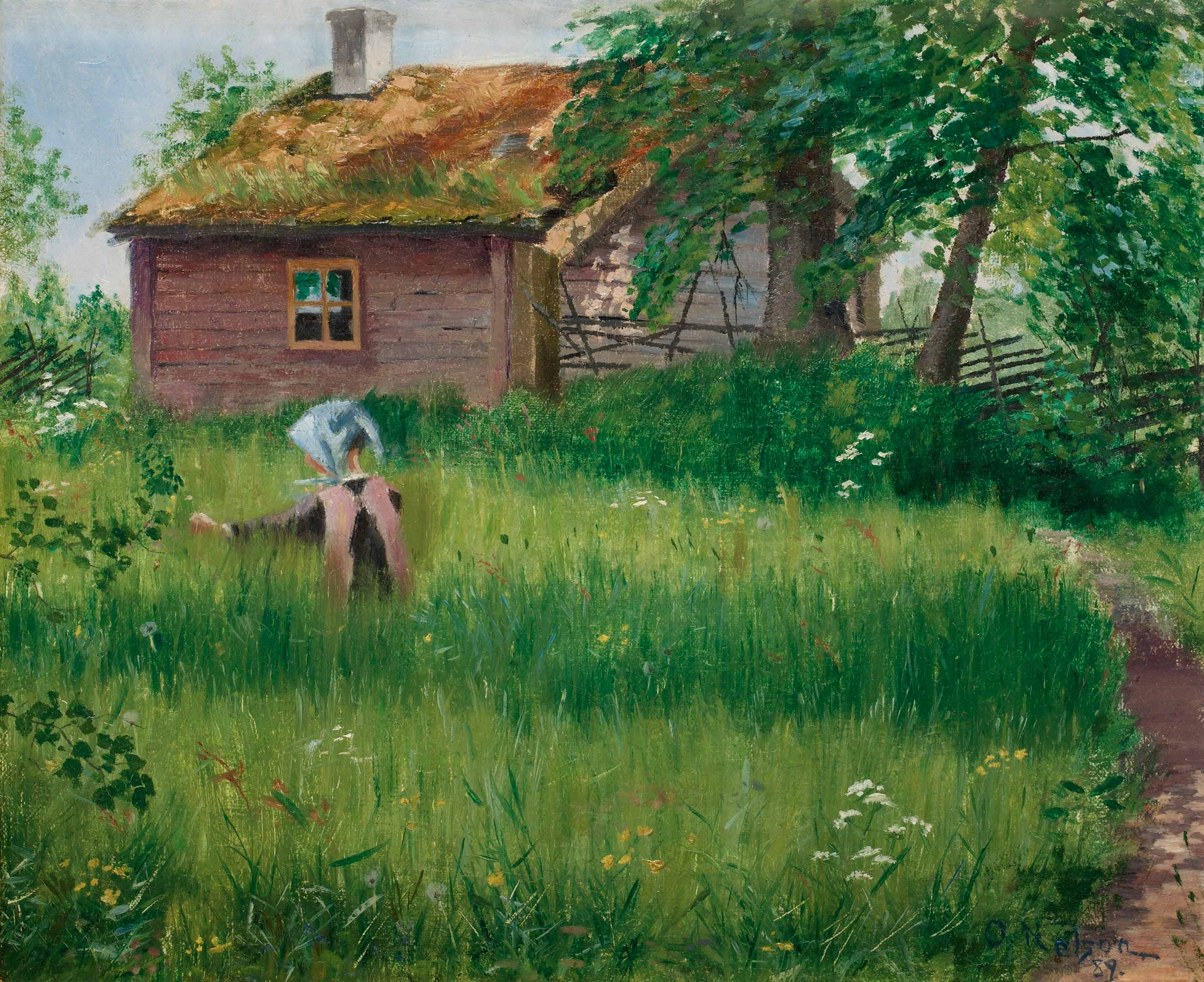
Girl in a Meadow

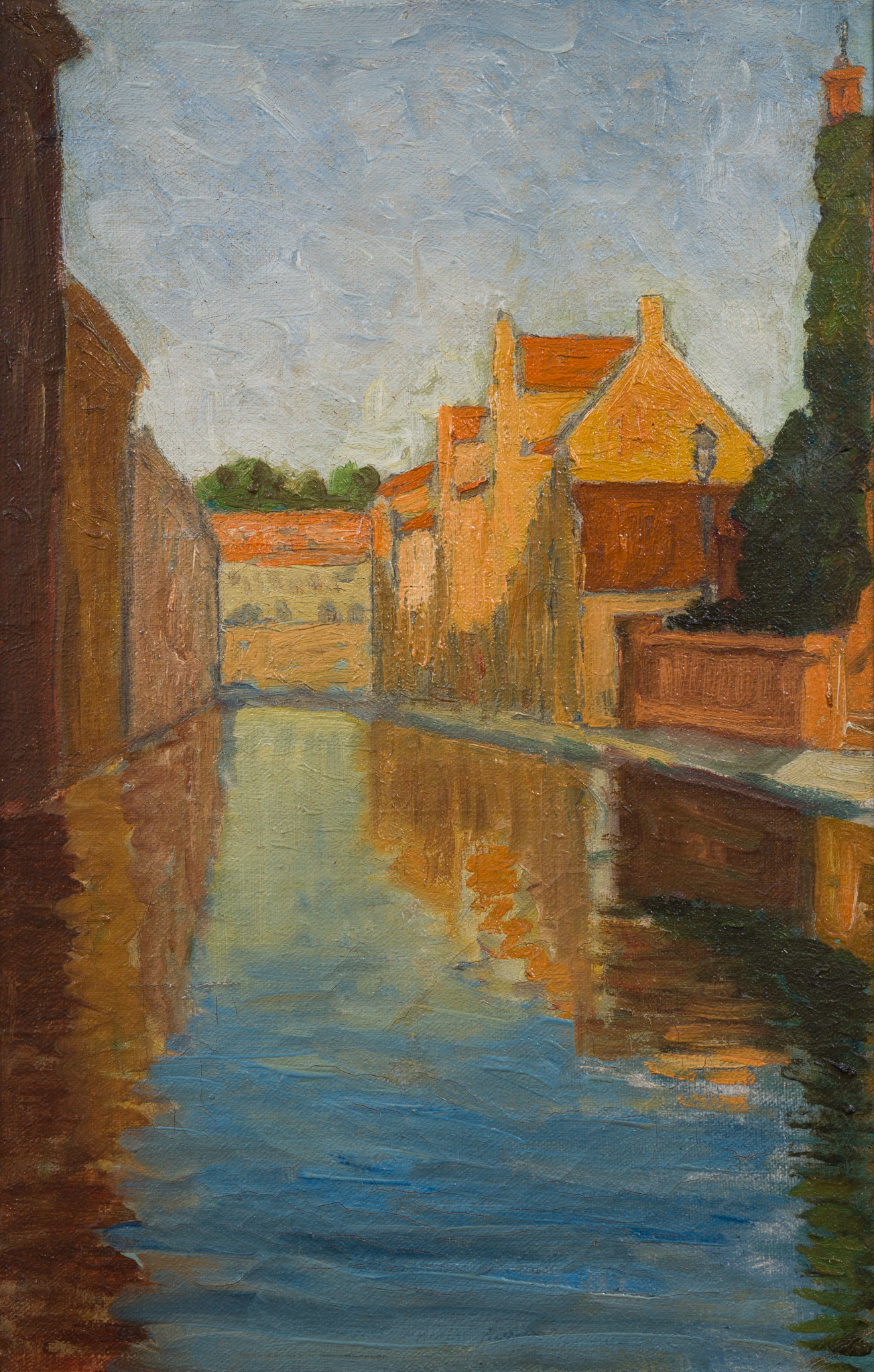
Bruges

Bruges

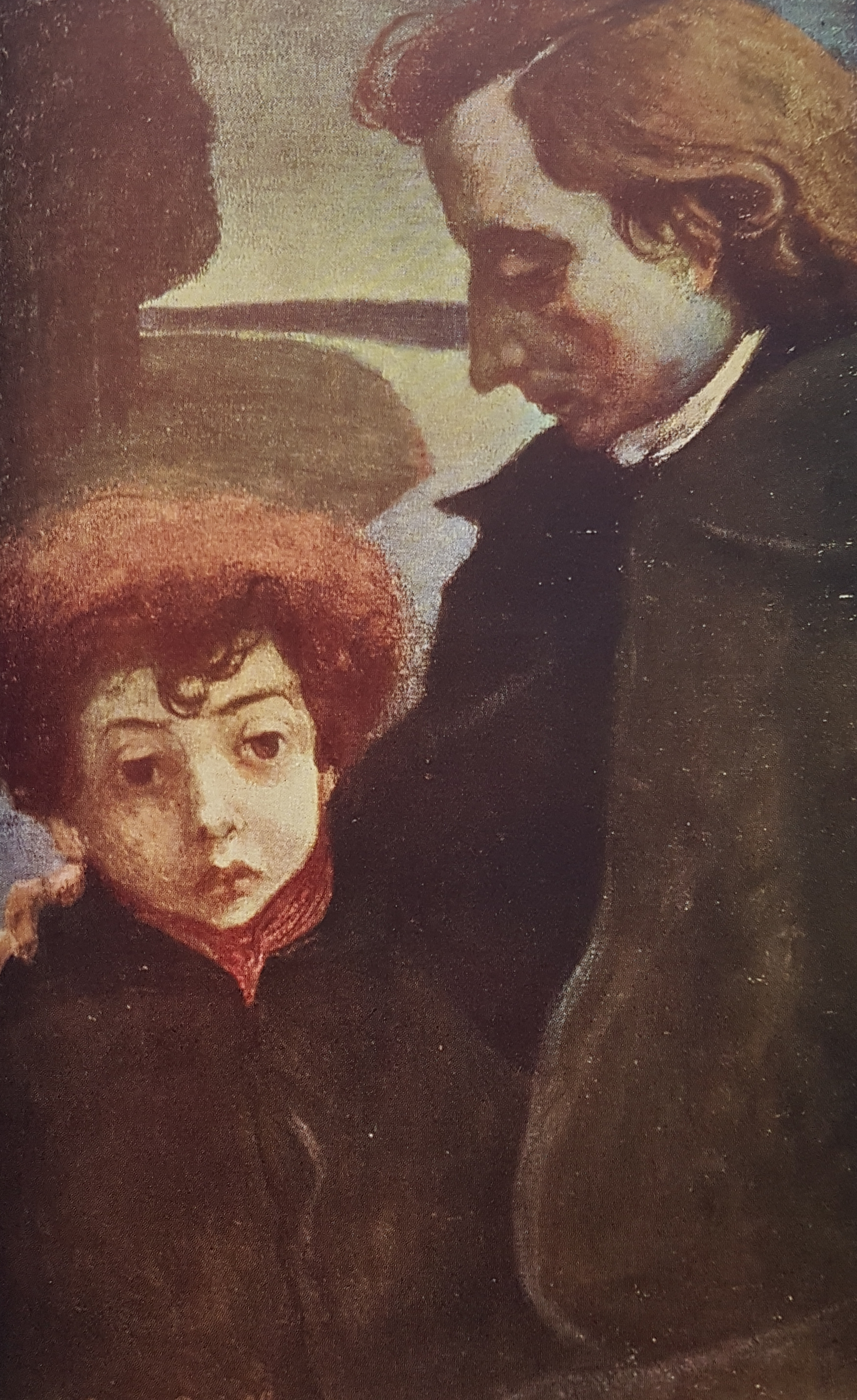
Foster Brothers
