= Anna Gardell-Ericson =

Swedish artist (1853–1939)

Anna Maria Gardell-Ericson
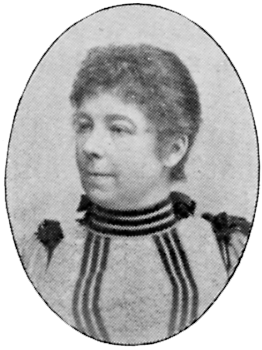
- Anna Gardell-Ericson from the Svenskt Porträttgalleri XX (1901)
- Born: 10 October 1853; Visby, Sweden
- Died: 2 June 1939 (aged 85); Stockholm, Sweden
- Known for: Painting
- Spouse: Johan Ericson (m. 1849–1849)

Anna Maria Gardell-Ericson (10 October 1853, Visby – 2 June 1939, Stockholm) was a Swedish painter and watercolorist. She specialized in coastal scenes and landscapes with lakes or rivers.

== Biography ==
Her father, Johan, is generally described as a landscape painter, although he may have been primarily a local administrative officer.

At the age of sixteen, she began painting and displayed sufficient talent for her to be sent to Switzerland to begin her studies. Later, she studied with Per Daniel Holm at the Royal Swedish Academy of Fine Arts in Stockholm; making her début at one of the Academy's exhibitions in 1875. The following year, she won a bronze medal at the Centennial Exposition in Philadelphia.

In 1879, she went to Paris to continue her studies with Alexandre-Louis Leloir and Ferdinand Heilbuth and copied the watercolors of Camille Corot. She had a major showing at the Salon of 1882 and, as a result, received a contract worth 1,000 Francs per month from the art dealers, Goupil & Cie. That same year, she married Johan Ericson, a landscape painter from Karlshamn. She also became a member of the Dudley Gallery art society.

She and her husband lived in France until 1884, when a cholera epidemic broke out in Paris. They then returned to Sweden and settled in Gothenburg. While there, she was a regular exhibitor at the Gummeson Gallery and the showings of several art associations. Gardell-Ericson exhibited her work at the Palace of Fine Arts at the 1893 World's Columbian Exposition in Chicago, Illinois.

Shortly before her death, she wrote her memoirs, but these have yet to be published. Major retrospectives were held in 1939 and 1946.

== Selected paintings ==
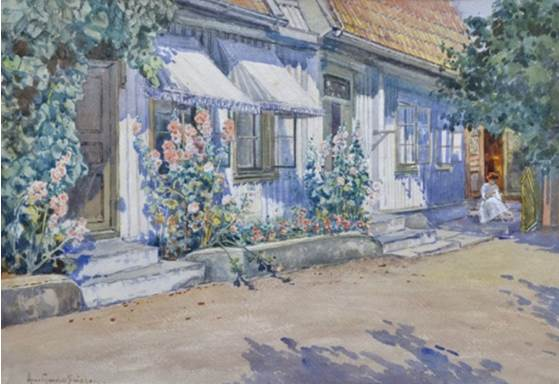
Street with Embroidering Woman and Hollyhocks

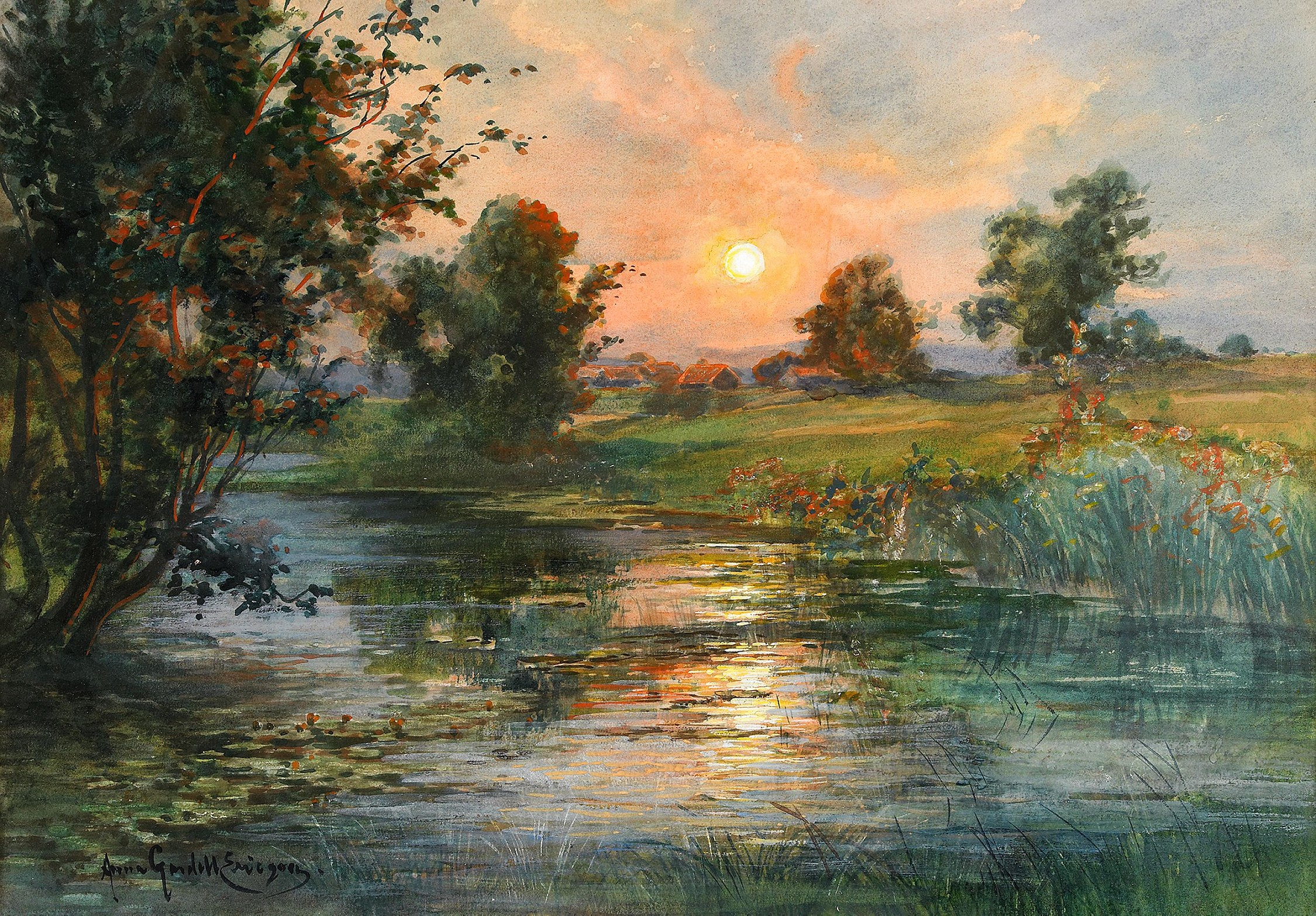
Sunrise over Watery Landscape

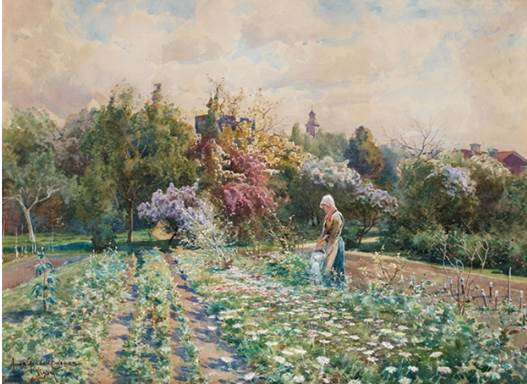
Flower Field in Visby

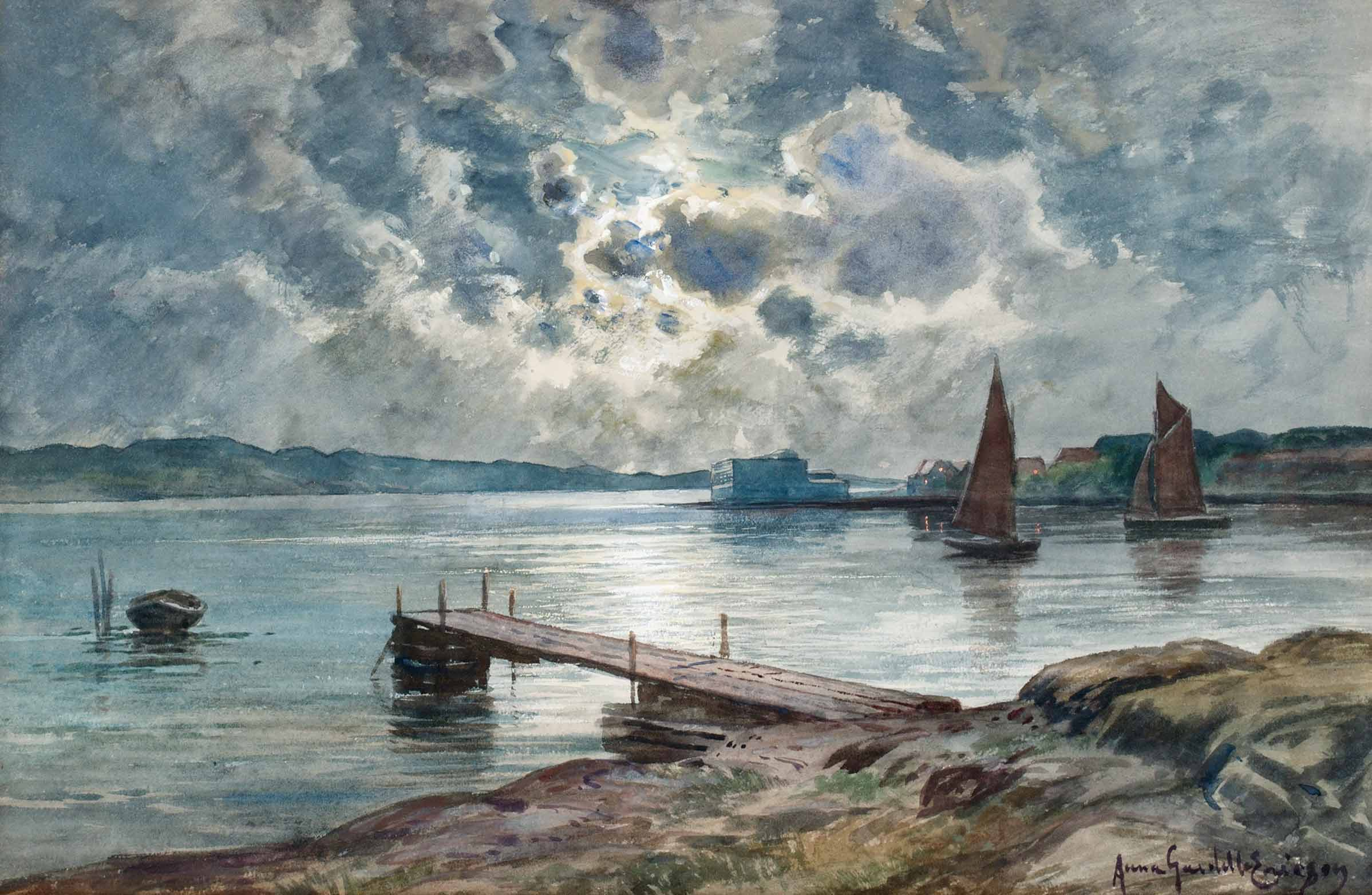
Scene from Marstrand

== Sources ==
- Biography from the Svenskt Biografiskt Lexikon @ the Riksarkivet
- Gösta Procopé, Konstnärsparet Anna Gardell-Ericson och Johan Ericson: en minnesbok, Hanseproduktion, 1982 ISBN 978-91-85716-21-0
