= Armand Rassenfosse =

Belgian illustrator and painter (1862–1934)

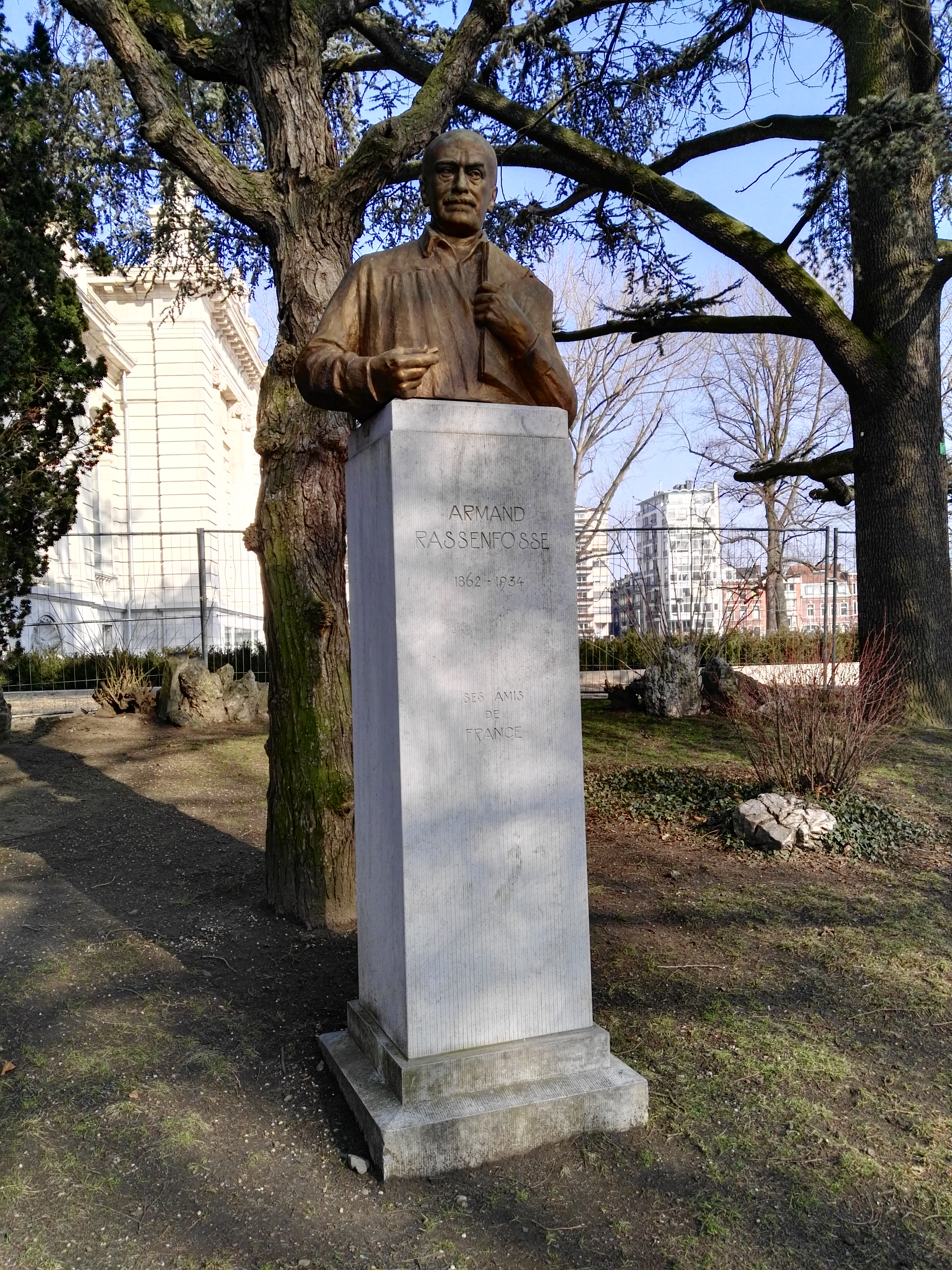
- Armand Rassenfosse by Pierre Félix Masseau, known as Fix Masseau
- Born: 6 August 1862; Liège
- Died: 28 January 1934 (aged 71); Liege
- Occupation: Artist
- Known for: Les Fleurs du mal illustrations

Armand Rassenfosse (6 August 1862 – 28 January 1934) was a largely self-taught Belgian graphic artist, book illustrator and painter. His masterwork was a set of illustrations for Charles Baudelaire's Les Fleurs du mal.

== Early years ==
Armand Rassenfosse was born in Liège on 6 August 1862. For generations his family had run a store selling home furnishings and decorative art works: crystal, porcelain, bronze and oriental rugs. Armand was expected to continue the family business. However, for the last years of his secondary education he went to Namur to study, living with his uncle, who gave him a few etchings by Félicien Rops from his collection. Already interested in art from his family background, he became intrigued with etching.

After completing secondary school Rassenfosse joined the family business. Auguste Donnay, whom Rassenfosse's father had hired to decorate a home, became a friend of Armand and introduced him to other students of the Academy of Fine Arts in Liege including Gustave Serrurier, Émile Berchmans and Oscar Berchmans. Unknown to his family, by 1882 Rassenfosse was contributing drawings signed "Zig" to the satirical journal Le Frondeur, and was experimenting with etching using crude tools. In 1884 he married. The same year he showed his work to Adrien de Witte, an art teacher at the Liège Academy of Fine Arts. de Witte encouraged him to try out new techniques, including pyrography. This is a decorative technique in which a line drawing is burned into the wood. He made his first painting this year. In 1886, he began contributing illustrations to the magazine Wallonia.

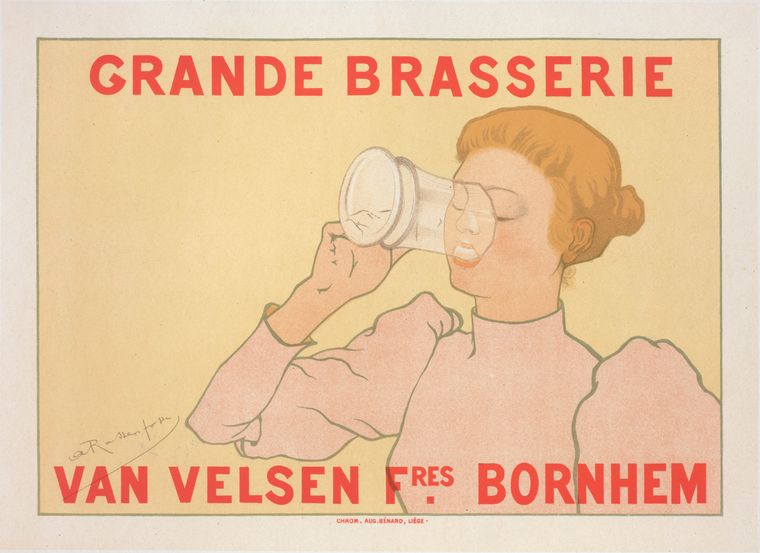
Poster for the Grande Brasserie Van Velsen frères

In 1887 Rassenfosse started to submit work to August Bénard, who had just founded his printing house in Liege. Over the years Rassenfosse would make many works for this house that he considered run of the mill, although some passed the test of time among the best of his works. At the age of 25 Rassenfosse was in Paris on family business and was introduced to Felicien Rops, his first inspiration, who was then at the height of his career. This was the start of a long friendship between the two men, who shared a common search for technical mastery in etching.

== Etching techniques ==
Rassenfosse was always interested in improved techniques. He only began to etch at the age of twenty-seven, but later became distinguished for his mastery of the different skills and techniques of engraving. Around 1890 Rassenfosse developed a new recipe for a special ink for etching, an ink that can be dissolved to expose the metal of the plate. Felicien Rops had been an early adopter of soft ground etching, using several types of paper in a single plate. Rassenfosse worked with him to develop a special soft ground mixture for reworking intaglio plates to which crayon drawings had been transferred photomechanically. The formula, which they called "Ropsenfosse", was finalized in 1892. Later, Rassenfosse may have been the first to make color prints from soft ground, using two or more plates.

Around 1923 he developed a new technique that eliminated the problem of printing a mirror image. He drew on smooth paper with the special ink, then laid the paper over the plate and ran it through the press to transfer the ink to the plate. He offset the drawing, powdered the plate with zinc oxide or whiting and coated the plate with a very thin layer of varnish. When treated with acid the effect was to create crayon-like lines.

== Full-time artist ==
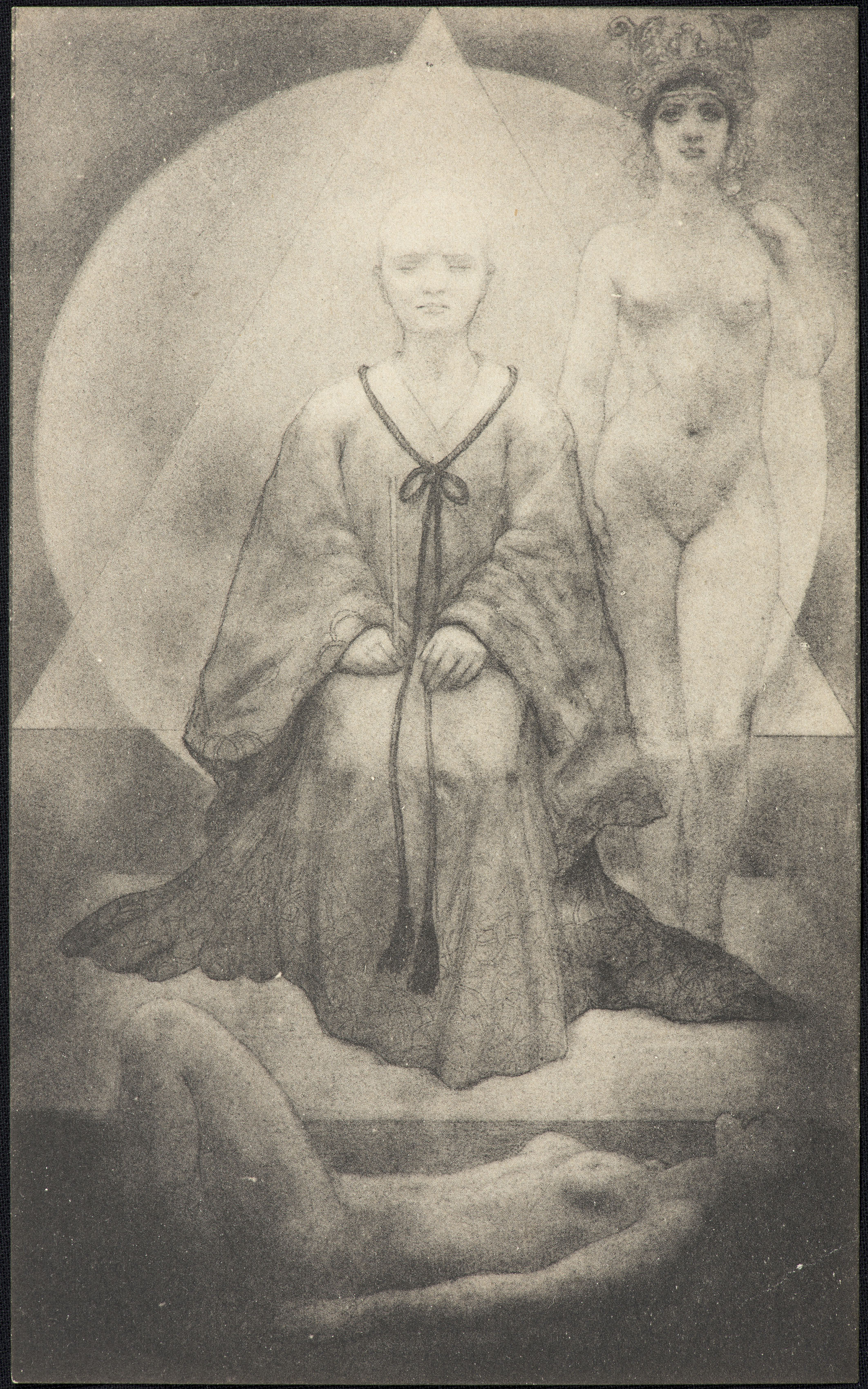
1909 Frontispiece for Le Solitaire de la lune by François de Curel (1854–1928)

At the age of twenty-eight Rassenfosse decided to leave the family business and devote himself entirely to art. His work for Bénard provided a living, and Bénard also introduced him to the practice of lithography. In 1896, he became an intern under Jules Chéret, a lithographer known for his high-quality artistic posters, at the Chaix printing works in Paris. The same year he exhibited in the third salon of "La Libre Esthetique" in Brussels. From then on his reputation continued to grow, with more exhibitions and commissions, particularly for publications.

Rassenfosse illustrated the supplement to the 1895 catalog of Rops' engravings published by Eugène Rodrigues-Henriques (1853-1928) in 1895. Between 1899 and 1901, Rassenfosse undertook a major contract with Rodrigues's "Société des Cent Bibliophiles" to illustrate Charles Baudelaire's poems Les Fleurs du mal. He created 160 color etchings for the book. The book was published in an edition of only 130 copies. It is not only the magnum opus of Armand Rassenfosse, but is also generally considered one of the highlights in the field of book illustration.

Rassenfosse was appointed Secretary of the Section of Fine Arts as part of the Liège International Expo 1905, and a member of the administrative committee of the Liege Academy of Fine Arts. He participated in several international exhibitions in 1906. When Bénard died in 1907 he had to undertake greater responsibilities with the printing house, leaving him less time for artistic work, leading to a temporary period of stagnation. The death of his son in 1913 and the rigors of World War I caused another crisis. In response he locked himself away for days at a time, absorbed in his work.

He began to work with oil on cardboard, with a smoother, more confident technique. Many of his paintings at this time were of women, mostly nudes in an intimate setting, but he also portrayed dancers in the rich scenery of Sergei Diaghilev's Ballets Russes or dancers in the style of Isadora Duncan. He was interested in the theme of "hiercheuses", as the young girls and women from the Liege coal industry were called. In some of his portraits of these women Rassenfosse depicts them as partly nude trollops, reflecting the traditional view of working women as being sexually promiscuous. The paintings showed them as younger and more attractive than the reality.

After the war ended, Rassenfosse continued to research new techniques of engraving and producing bookplates, and continued to make many illustrations for books. He received numerous titles and awards, including Commander of the Order of Leopold. Rassenfosse died in Liege on 28 January 1934.

A bronze bust of Rassenfosse, executed by his friend Fix Masseau, stands in the Parc de la Boverie.

== Honours ==
- 1931: Grand Officer in the Order of the Crown (Belgium).
- Member of the Royal Academy of Belgium.

== Style ==
Rassenfosse has often been linked with Felicien Rops as a follower. This is perhaps unfair. One author has said, for example, that while Rops portrayed courtesans, Rassenfosse depicted the daughters of working people. In his intimate nude studies the women have natural elegance, but are not purely objects of desire, as Rops would have made them. However, talking of Rassenfosse's earlier work another writer said that in his advertisements he and others of the time "exploited the image of the sensuous, beautiful young woman ... in a serenely dreamy state ... the stylised embodiment of temptation..."

== Gallery ==
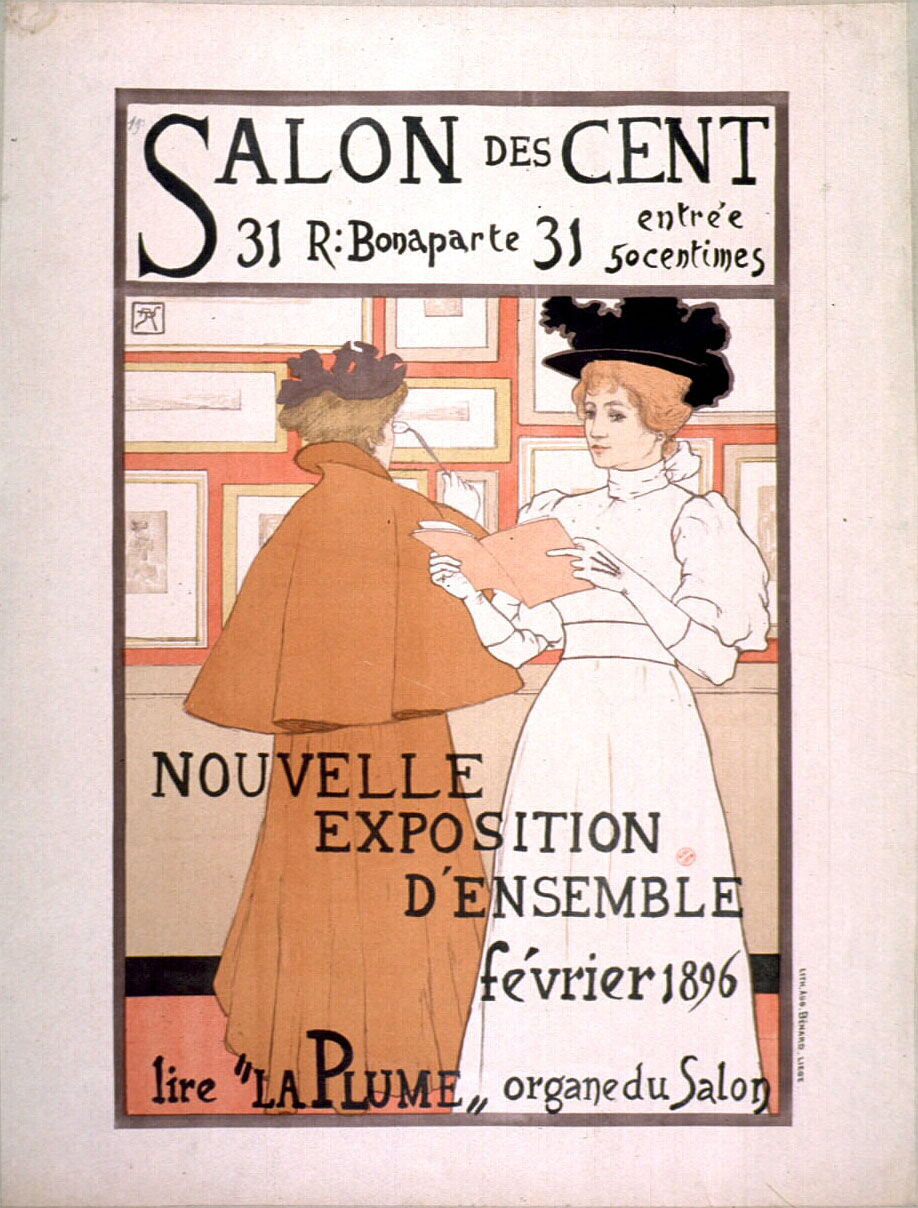
Poster for Salon des Cent exhibition in 1896

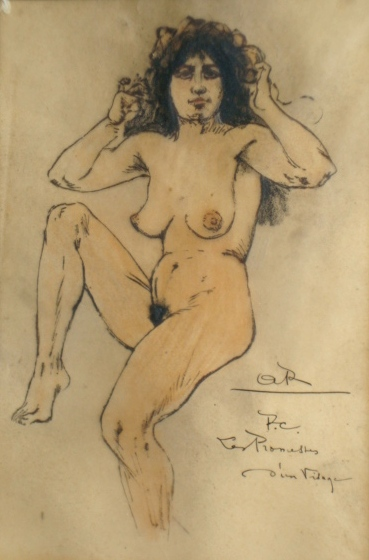
1899 illustration for 'Promesses d'un visage' in Charles Baudelaire's 'Les Fleurs du mal'

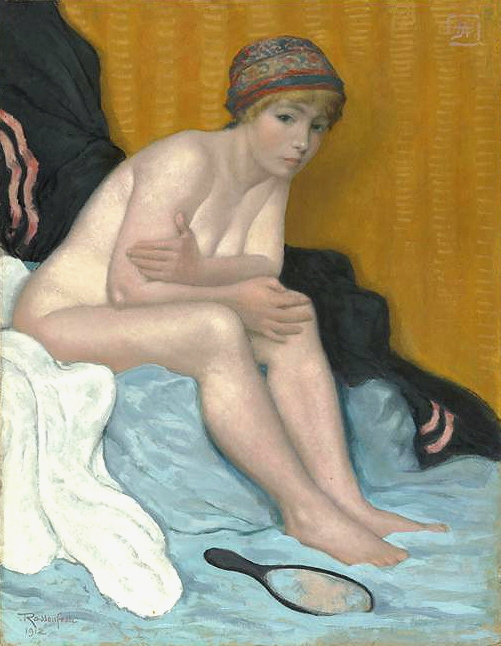
Poyette (1912)

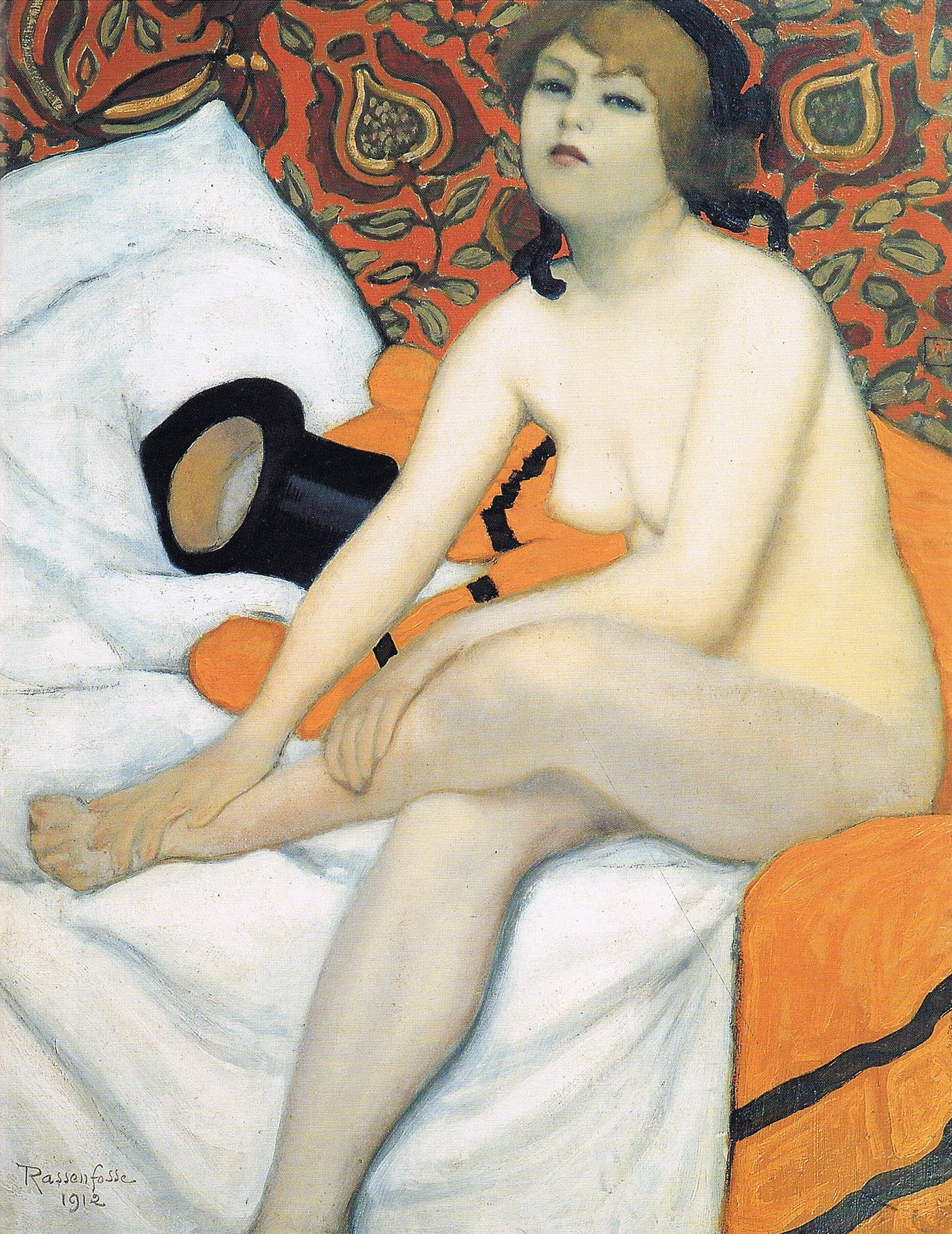
Le peignoir jaune (1912)

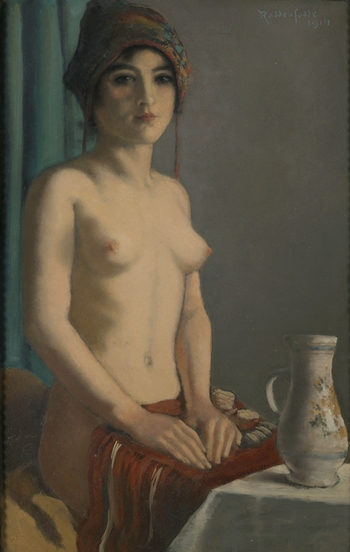
Le bonnet hongrois (1914)

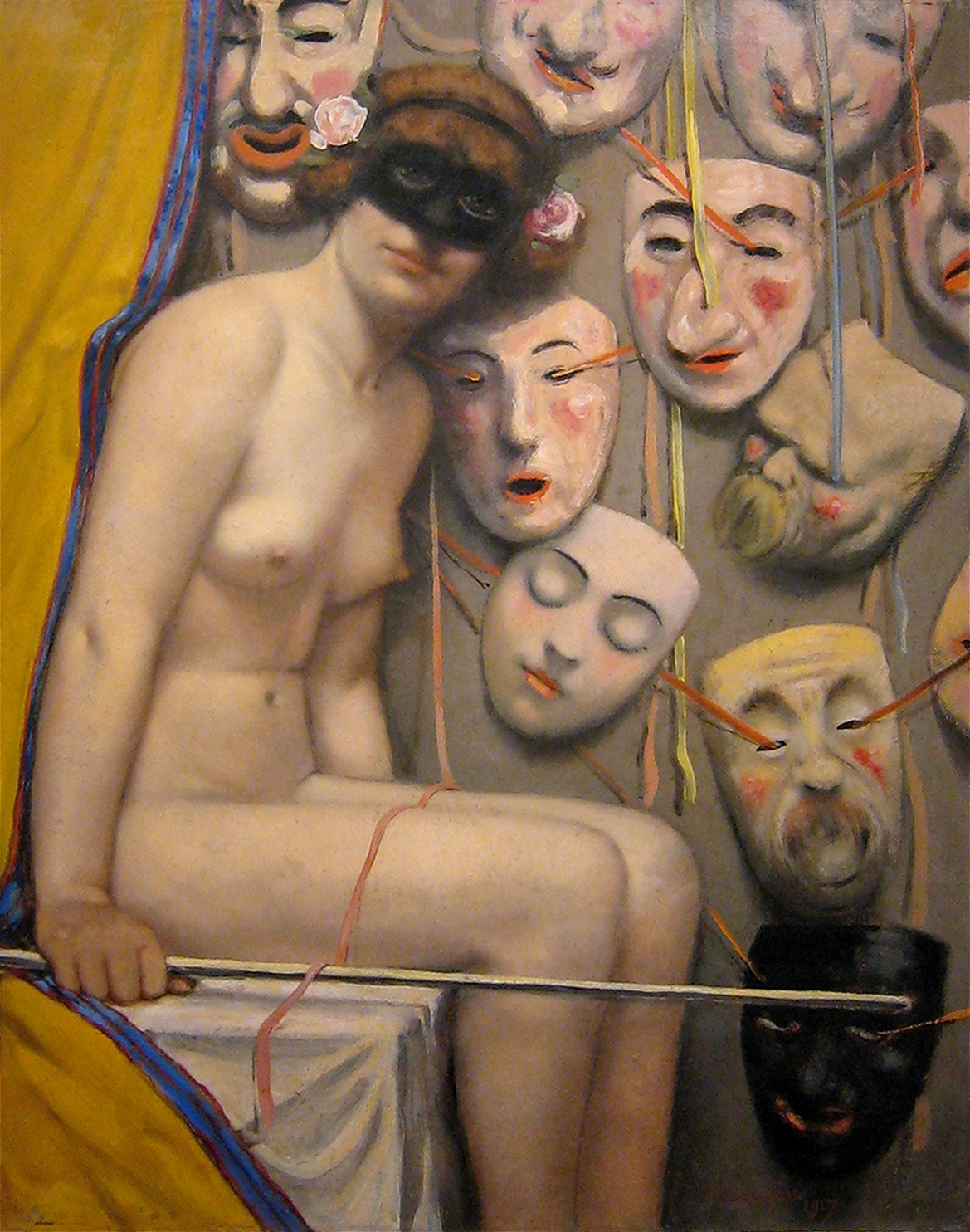
La marchande de masques (1917)

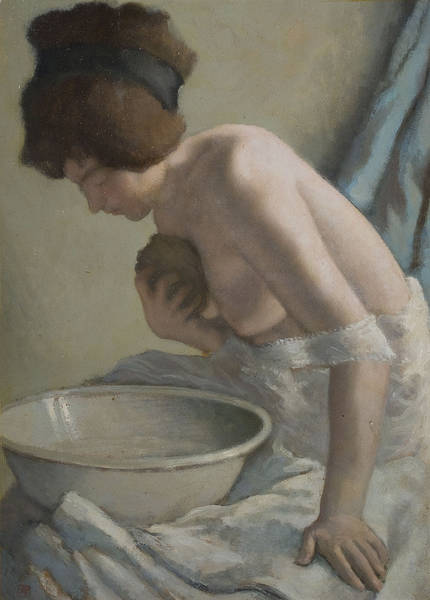
Femme à l'éponge

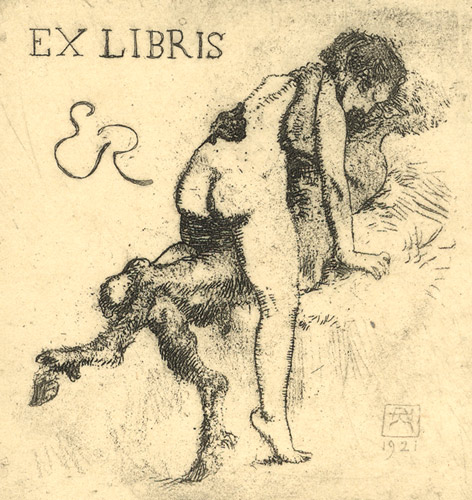
Erotic bookplate (1921)
