= Johan Ericson =

Swedish painter (1849–1925)

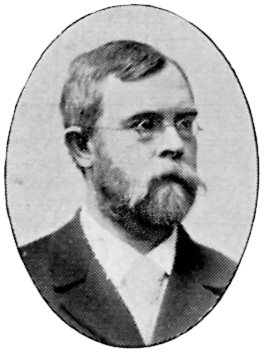
Johan Ericson, from the Svenskt Porträttgalleri XX

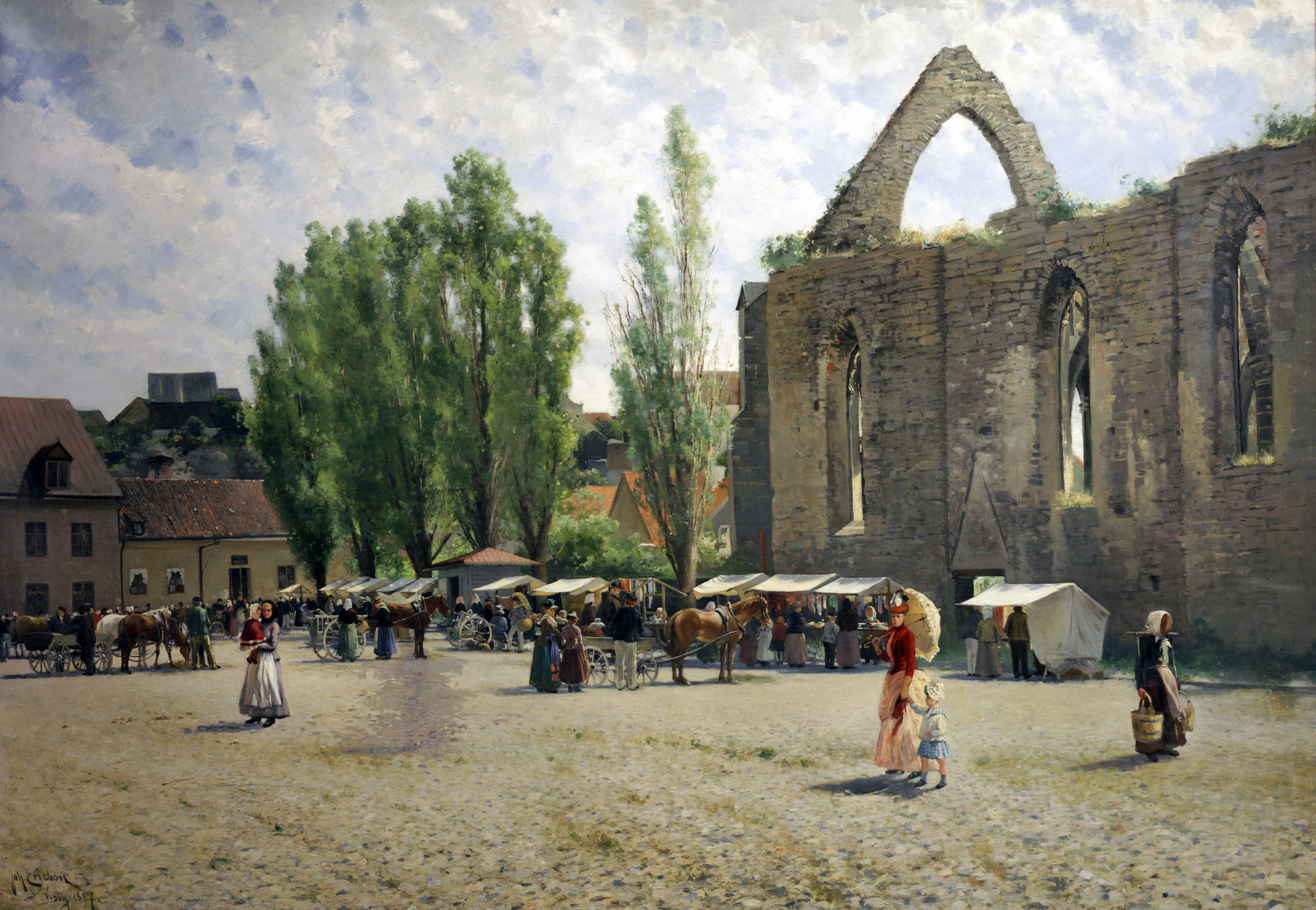
The Great Square in Visby

Johan Erik Ericson (17 October 1849, Karlshamn - 26 September 1925, Gothenburg) was a Swedish landscape painter.

== Biography ==
He was born to Anders Eriksson, a woodcarver, and his wife Johanna, née Petersson. His father emigrated to America when he was only four.

From 1872 to 1878, he studied at the Royal Institute of Art, where his primary teacher was Per Daniel Holm. This was followed by studies in France from 1878 to 1884, where he came under the influence of the Impressionists and served as an assistant in the studios of Alfred Wahlberg. In 1882, he married Anna Maria Gardell, who was also a landscape painter. The couple left France during a cholera epidemic.

Upon returning to Sweden in 1885, he became a teacher of freehand drawing at the Chalmers Institute of Technology, a position he held until 1915. He also served as director of the Valand Academy from 1889 to 1890. For several years, he was a member of the purchasing committee at the Göteborg Museum of Art and sat on the board of the Göteborg Art Association.

In addition to landscapes and cityscapes, he painted portraits. Over the course of his career, his style became more austere. His favorite locations included Bohuslän, Gotland and Skåne.

His work may be seen at numerous museums, including the Nationalmuseum, the Göteborg Museum of Art, Helsingborgs museum, Östergötlands museum, Kalmar konstmuseum, Gotlands konstmuseum, and the Norrköpings konstmuseum. Retrospectives were held in 1927 and 1949.
