= Haviland & Co. =

Porcelain manufacturer in Limoges, France

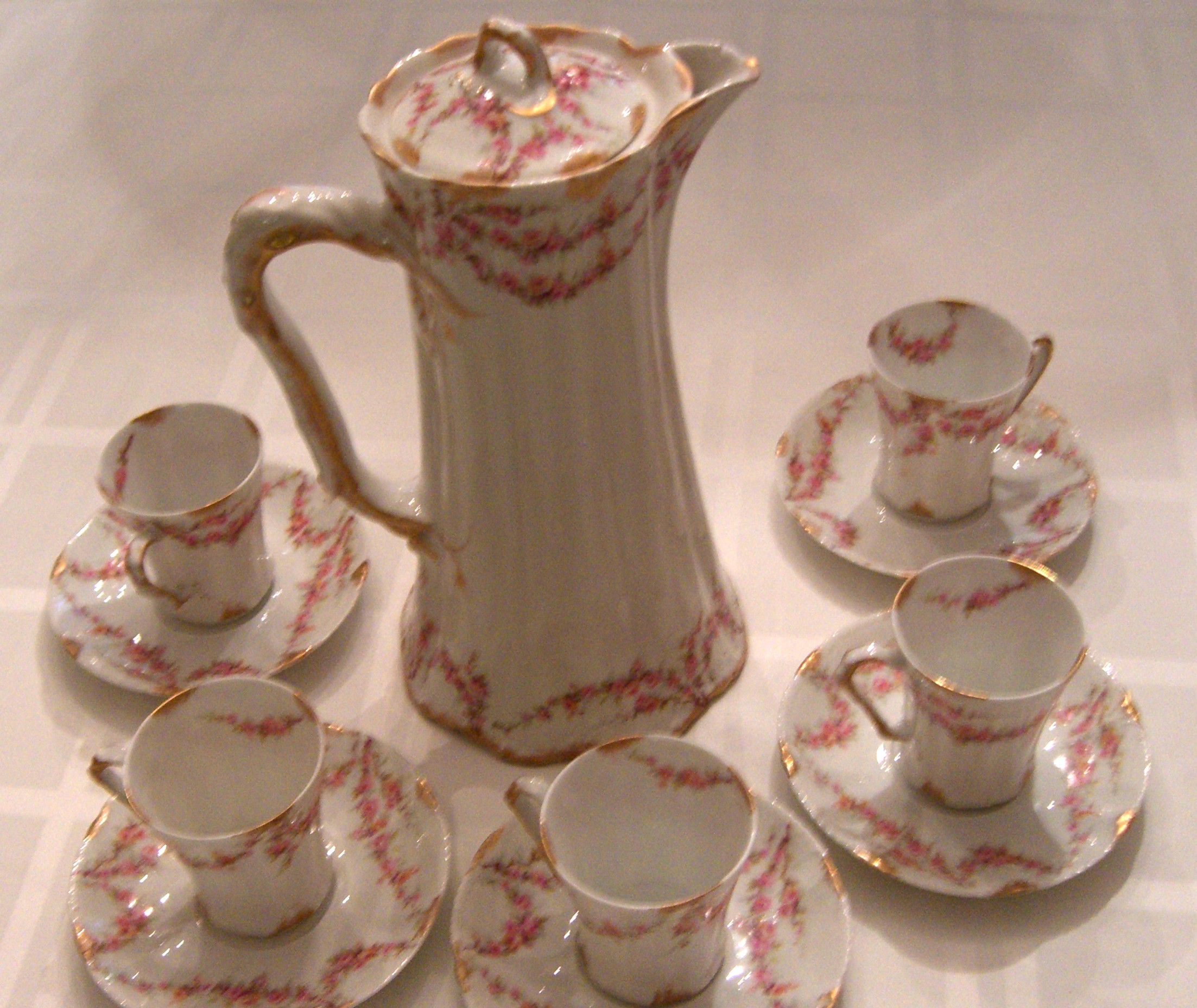
- Porcelain hot chocolate set by Théodore Haviland, Limoges, circa 1895–1905.
- Formerly: Haviland Brothers & Company
- Type: Private
- Industry: Porcelain manufacturing
- Founded: 1842
- Founder: David Haviland
- Headquarters: Limoges, France
- Area served: Worldwide
- Products: Limoges porcelain, tableware, dinnerware, silverware, crystal, giftware

Haviland & Co. is a manufacturer of Limoges porcelain in France, begun in the 1840s by the American Haviland family, importers of porcelain to the U.S., which has always been the main market. Its finest period is generally accepted to be the late 19th century, when it tracked wider artistic styles in innovative designs in porcelain, as well as stoneware and sometimes other ceramics.

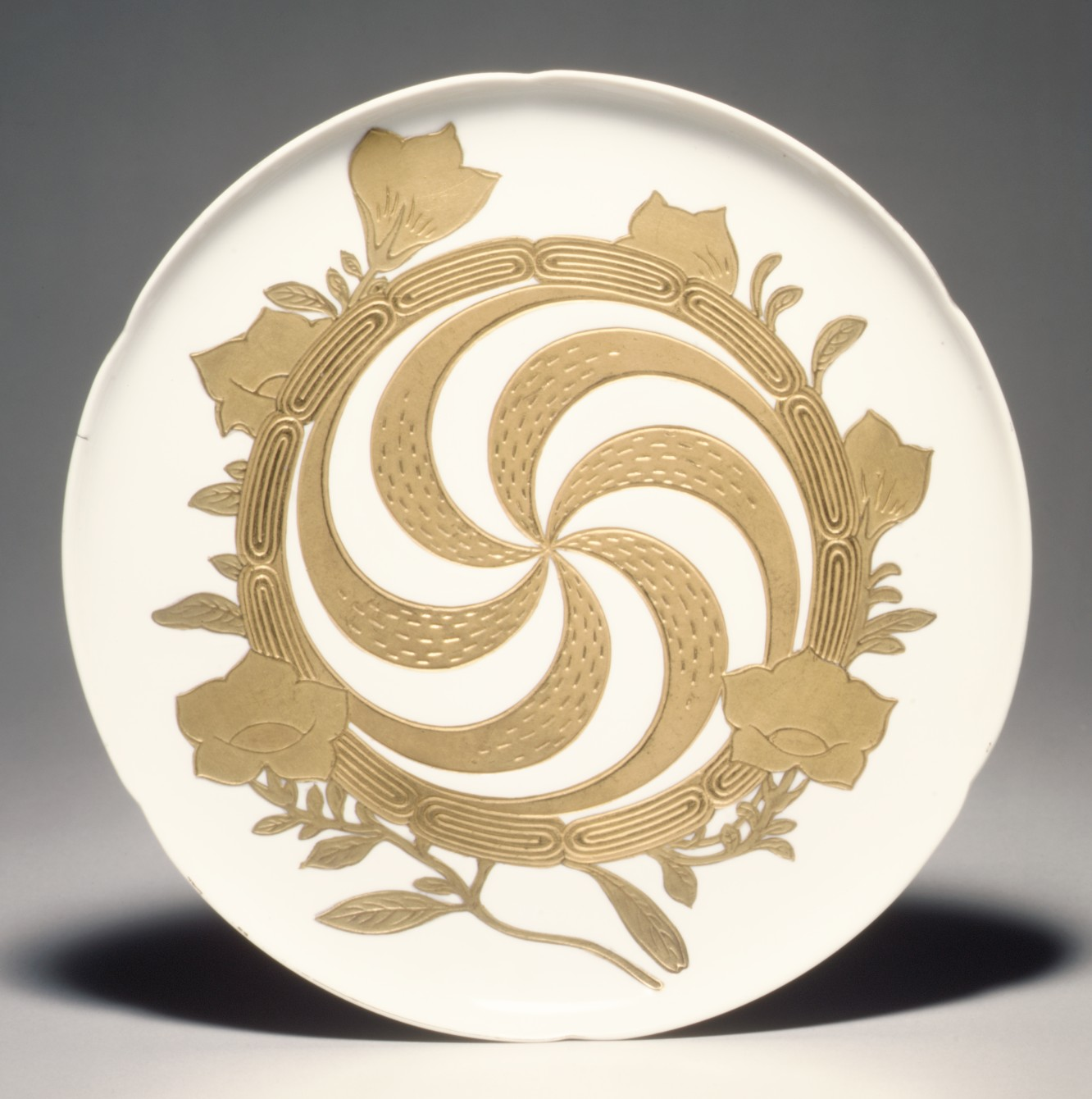
Porcelain plate designed by Félix Bracquemond, 1872-1880

== History ==
American David Haviland was a New York–based importer/exporter who imported French porcelains.Charles Haviland explained his father's history as such:

"In 1839, my father was an importer of English Porcelain and earthenware in New York, when he happened to see a French porcelain tea service that had, I know not how, found its way across the Atlantic. My father found the material of this service quite superior to that of the English porcelain and earthenware that had been the object of his trade and thought it would be a good thing to be the first in America to introduce tableware very superior to that in use in his country at that time...he went to France with his samples, asking anyone he thought might know, in what locality they had been made. Finally, in Paris, he was told it had to be Limoges porcelain."

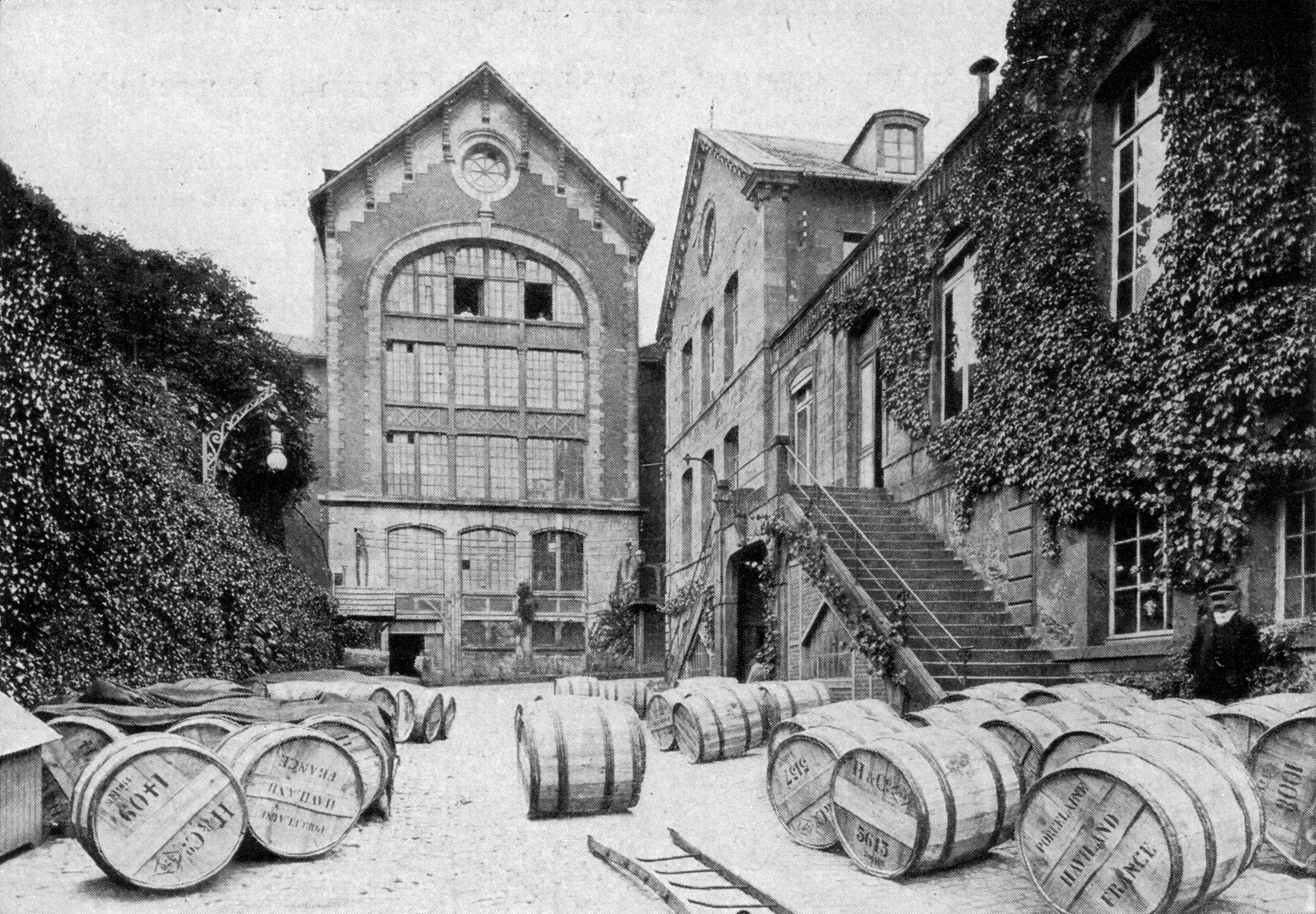
Pottery was packed in barrels for shipping to the US; outside the factory, 1917

While others were selling French wares, David Haviland recognized the quality of French wares and pivoted his importing business to center around French porcelains. Initially, he moved to France in 1842 and by sold wares directly to his brothers who remained in New York. Soon after beginning operations, he decided to open his own manufacturing factory. The new company was called Haviland Brothers & Company.

Before David Haviland, pieces were crafted in Limoges and then sent to Paris for decoration, often these decorators would add their own marks to the pieces. Haviland found this to be inefficient and made it difficult to control the quality of the product being produced. He also found that Parisian decorators were not willing to modify their designs to suit an American taste. Americans, in general, preferred the English style of decoration. Therefore, Haviland opened his own school for decorators where he could have them trained in a style that combined English and French design that would appeal to an American market. This cut out the need to send wares to Paris and allowed Haviland to precisely estimate how much it would cost to create his wares.

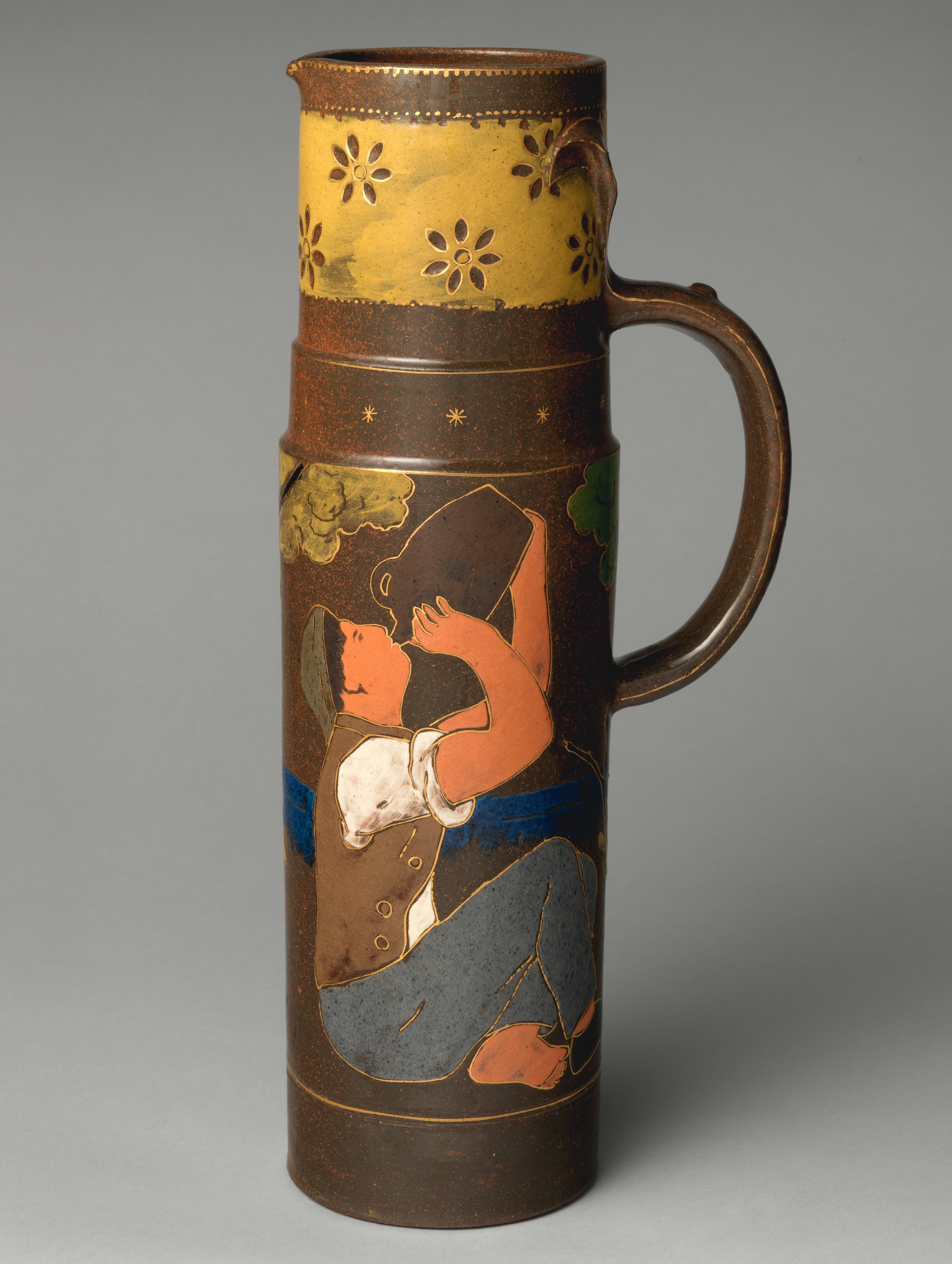
Stoneware tankard with man drinking from jug, ca 1885

Early on in operations, Haviland acquired white blanks from other porcelain manufactories in Limoges and decorated the wares in-house. Some of these blanks were already decorated in high-fire colors, which required a kiln that could reach temperatures high enough to burn porcelain. The factory did have a muffle kiln which got sufficiently hot enough to set low-fire colors and to add gilding, which burns at the lowest temperature. The factory did not have a high-fire kiln until 1853 when they applied for permission to build two of them. Haviland did not acquire the ability to significantly produce porcelains completely in-house until 1865.

Due to Haviland Brothers & Company's market success, they significantly altered the porcelain market in France. Their streamlined business model and market dominance meant that other firms had to copy their innovations or be squeezed out.

By 1853, they were the largest importer of French porcelain into the United States. Limoges seemed to be particularly popular in North America in four market regions: in French Canada, New York, Mississippi Valley, and in the southeastern United States as a whole. Its popularity in the Antebellum south is shown in the fact that it had subsidiaries in Augusta, Charleston, and Mobile. This also means that during the American Civil War and immediately afterwards, Haviland & Co. lost a large share of its buyers who were preoccupied with war.

The effects of the American Civil War were so pronounced that Haviland Brothers & Co. had to close its doors. David Haviland saw this as an opportunity to go into business for himself and rebranded his new company Haviland & Co. He also brought his two sons, Charles Edward and Theodore into the company. Charles Edward quickly took over the day-to-day operations from his father and Theodore moved to the United States to handle the side of the business that had formerly belonged to their uncles – the exporting and promoting of Haviland China.

The company continued to be managed by the two brothers with Charles Edward largely in control and managing the day-to-day operations and Theodore in America until 1879 when Theodore moved back to France. Both brothers in one location proved to be too much for either and they decided to dissolve their partnership in 1891. Charles Edward continued with the business and Theodore opened his own business, Theodore Haviland, Limoges, in 1893. The two companies competed bitterly until Charles Edward's death in 1921, the company folded in 1931. In 1941, William Haviland, Theodore's son, bought the rights to the Haviland & Company name and began production of wares after World War II.

The Haviland company has since been overseen by grandson William Haviland, and great-grandson Theodore Haviland II.

=== Today ===
Haviland & Co. is operating as Haviland Company, though the facilities are now modernized and now sell silverware, crystal, and giftware in addition to porcelain.

== Porcelain ==
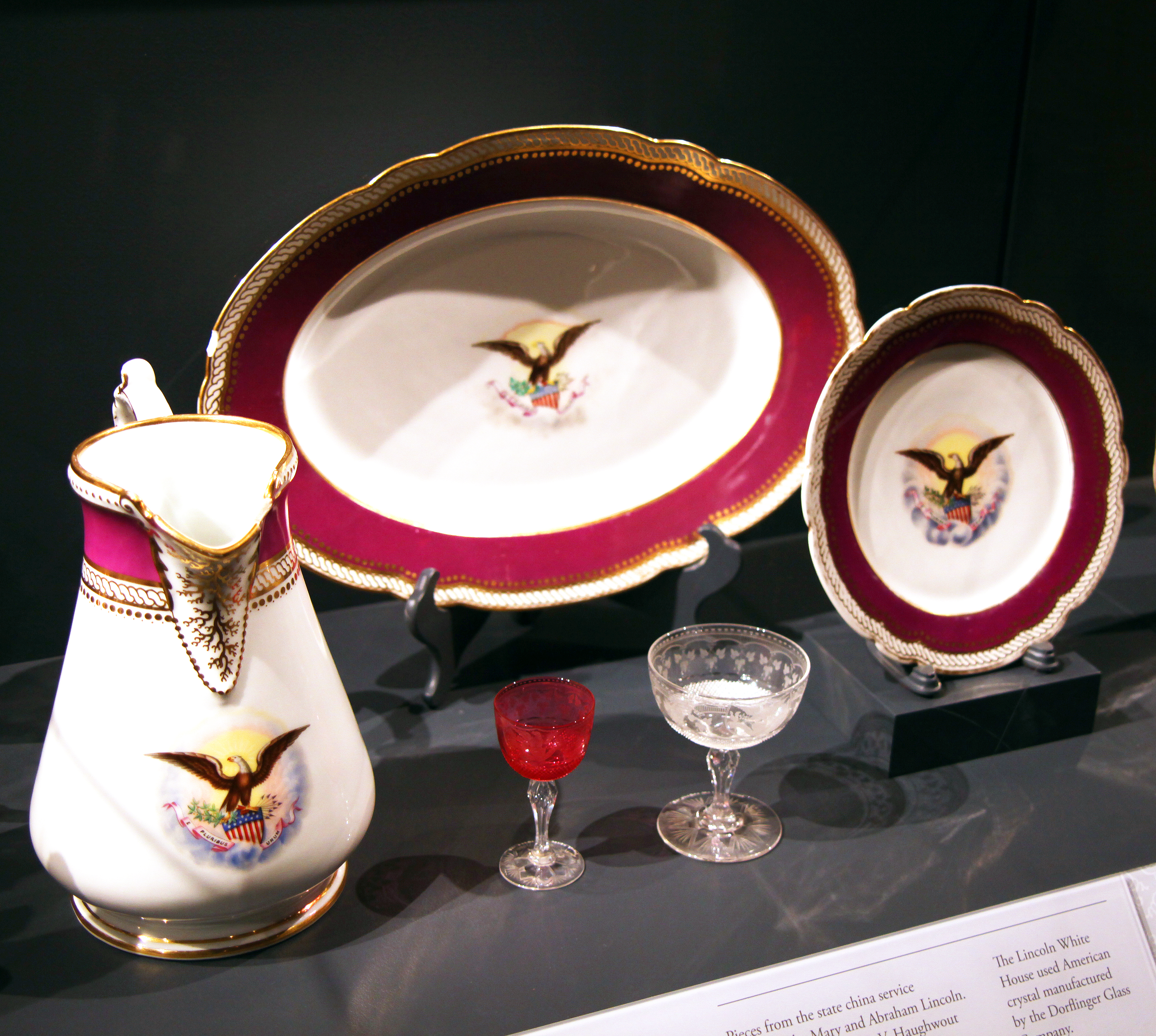
Pieces of the 1861 Lincoln "solferino" china

Many of the older pieces are still in existence and are desirable as an antique or collectable. It is estimated that there are as many as 60,000 Haviland porcelain patterns, though it is difficult to determine as many of the patterns have never been formally named or catalogued, and factory records are incomplete. Attempts to catalogue the pieces have resulted in several systems, including the creation of Schleiger numbers, and informal naming by collectors.

=== Schleiger Numbers ===
This numbering system was developed by Arlene Schleiger beginning in the 1930s and was published in 6 volumes, and covered approximately 4000 examples of Haviland & Co. porcelain. 34372

=== Prominent examples ===
Haviland has produced many prominent pieces, including:

- A "solferino" (purple bordered) hard-paste service in 1861 for use in the White House during the administration of Abraham Lincoln.

=== Gallery ===
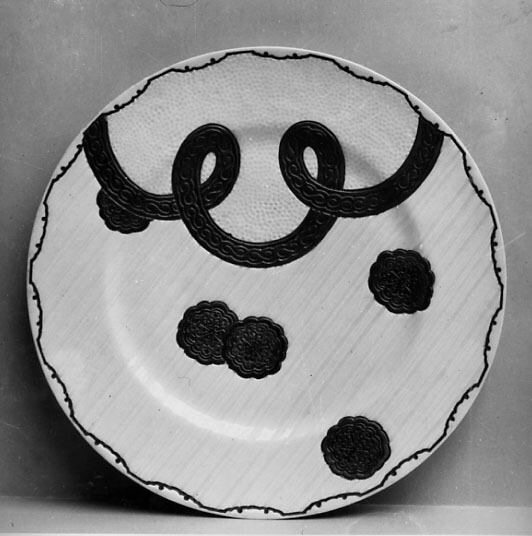
Porcelain plate, designed by Félix Bracquemond, 1872-79 (bw photo)

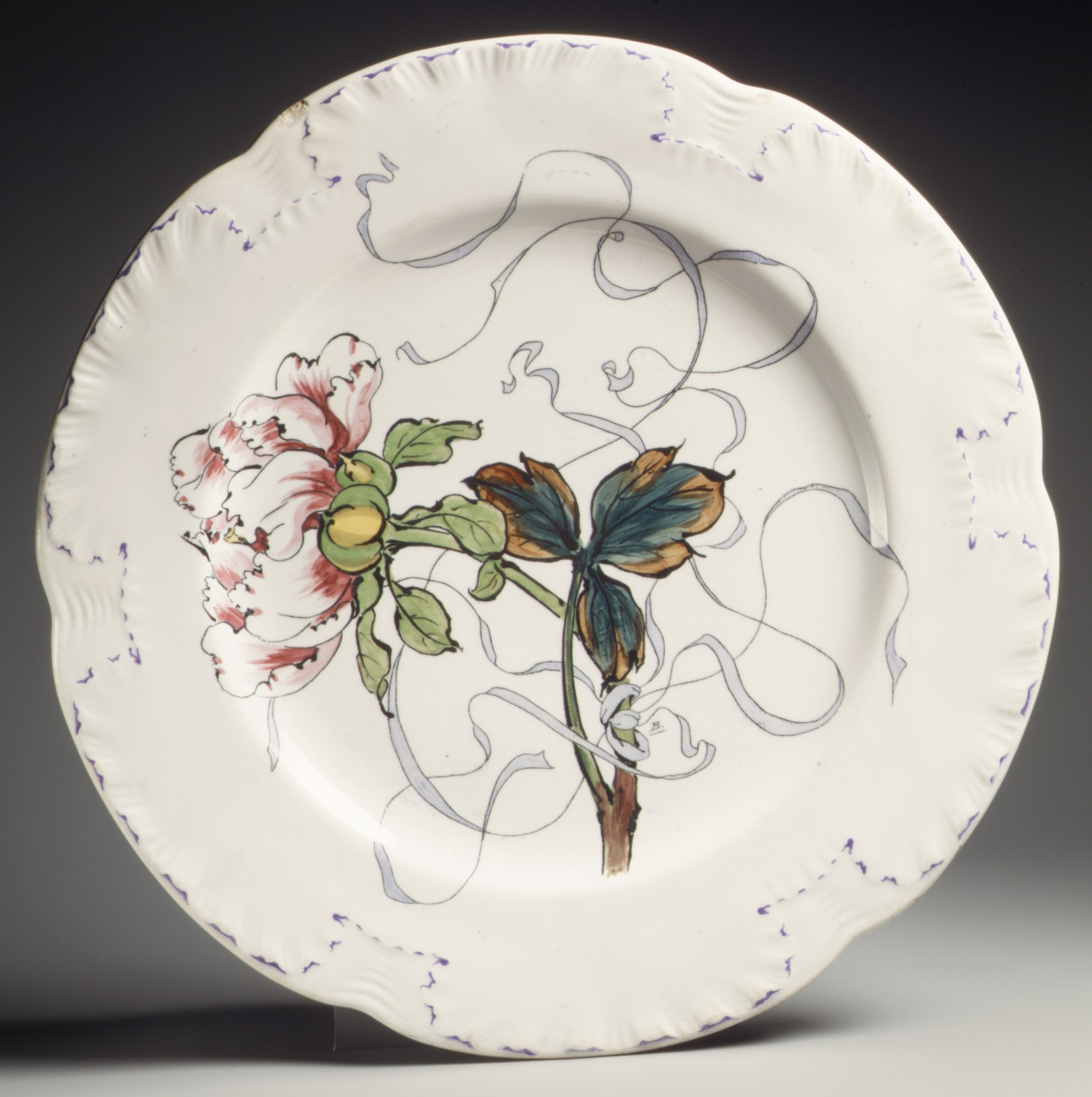
Glazed earthenware plate, designed by Félix Bracquemond, 1879

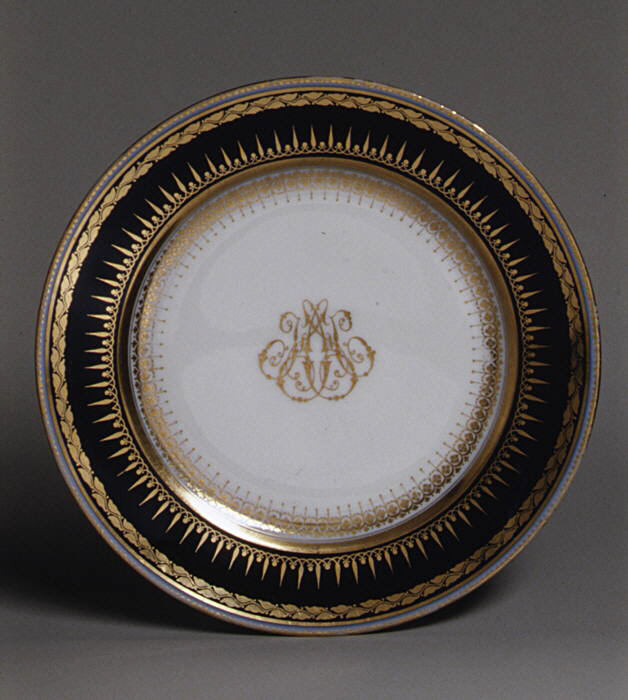
Porcelain plate, decorated in Paris, 1876–88

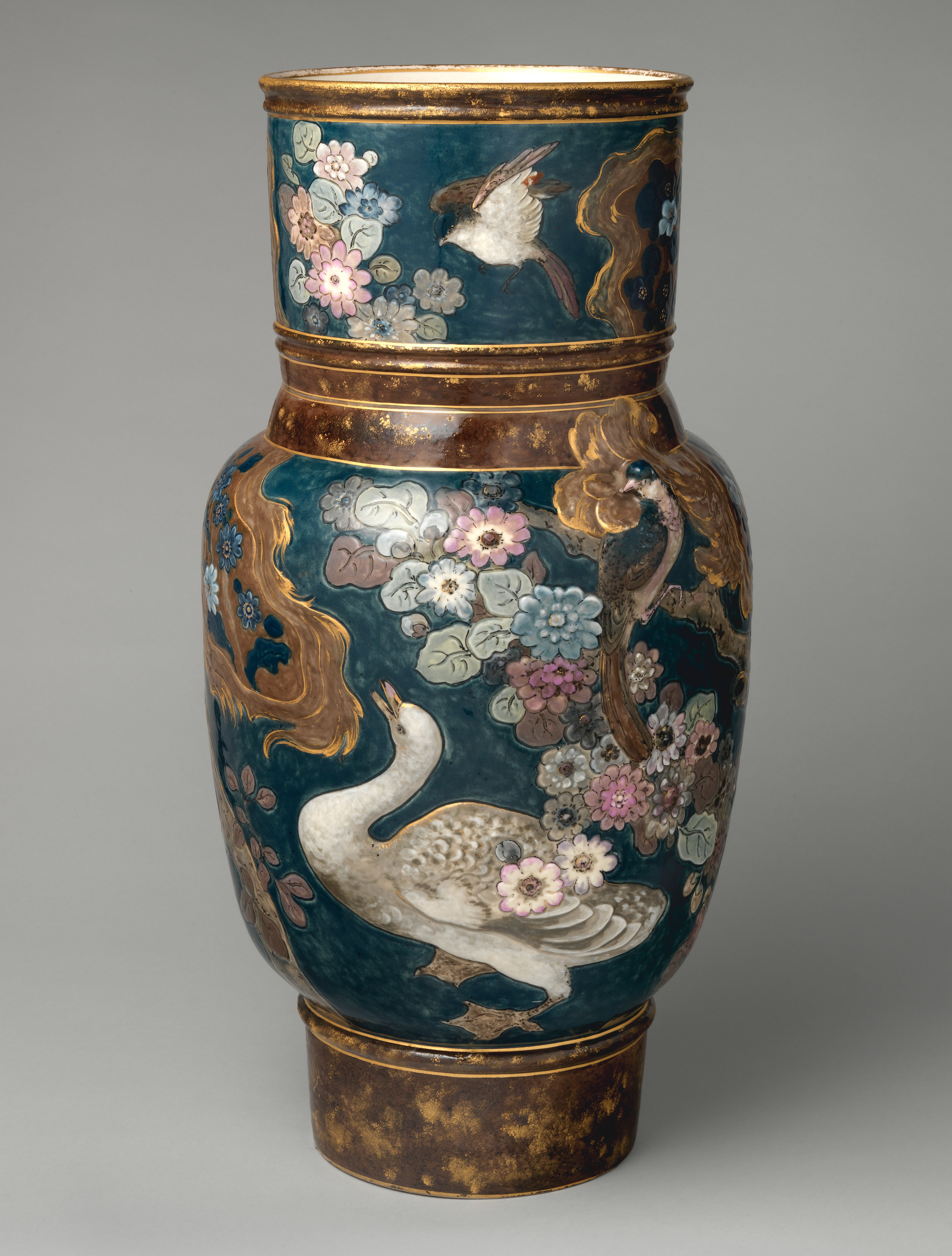
Porcelain vase by Ernest Chaplet, c. 1880

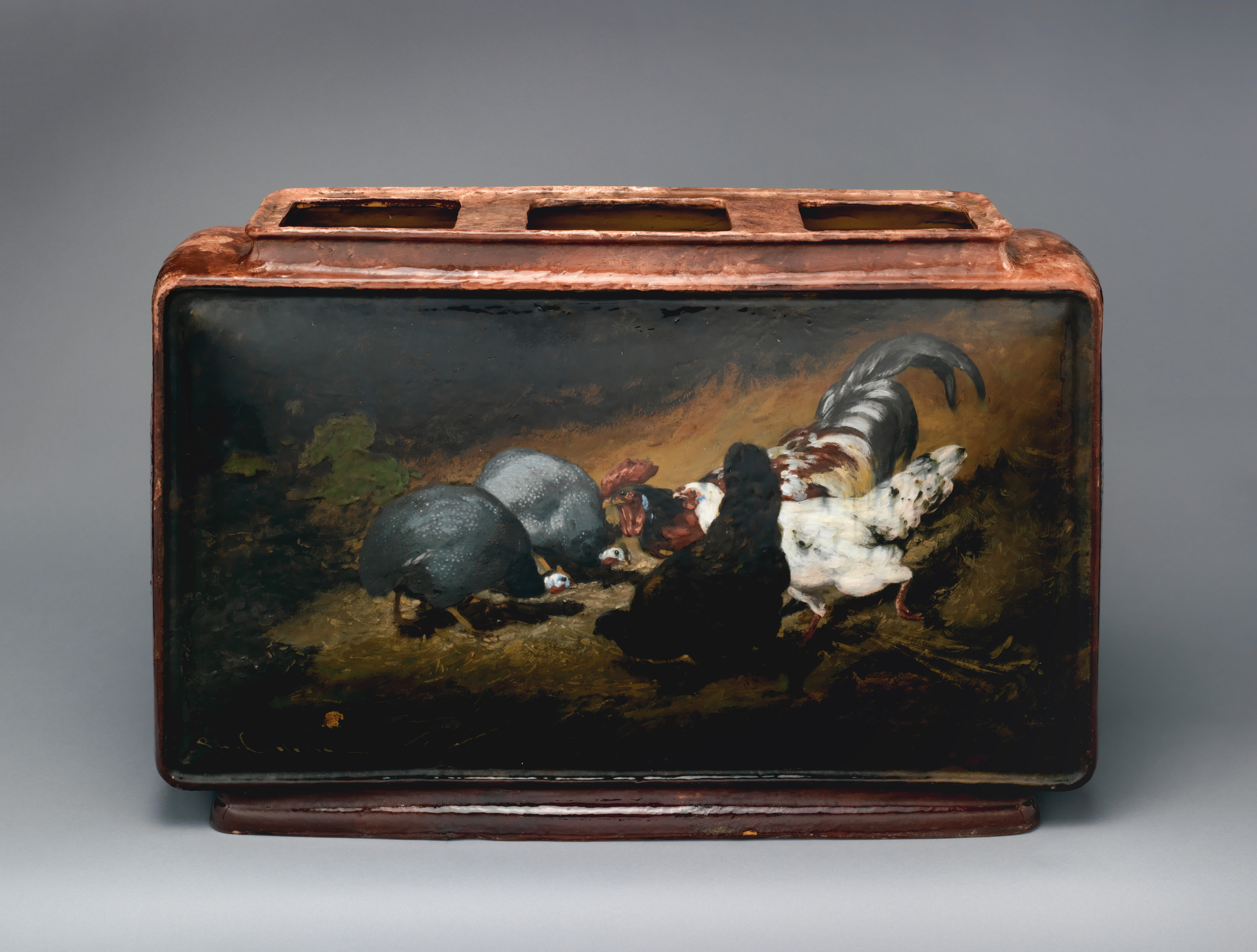
Stoneware jardiniere with chickens, ca 1880

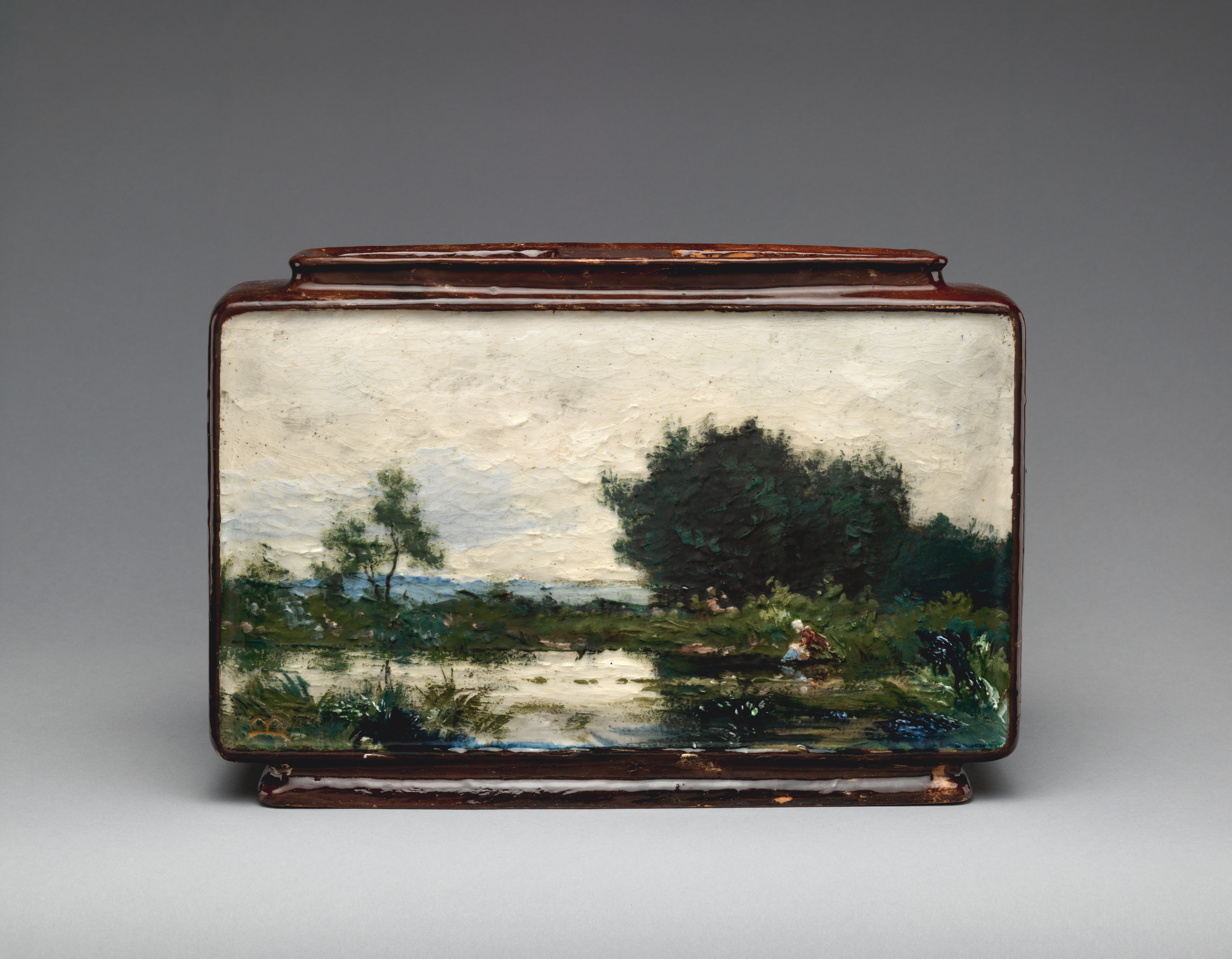
Earthenware jardiniere with Impressionist (or Corot-esque) landscape by Émile-Justin Merlot

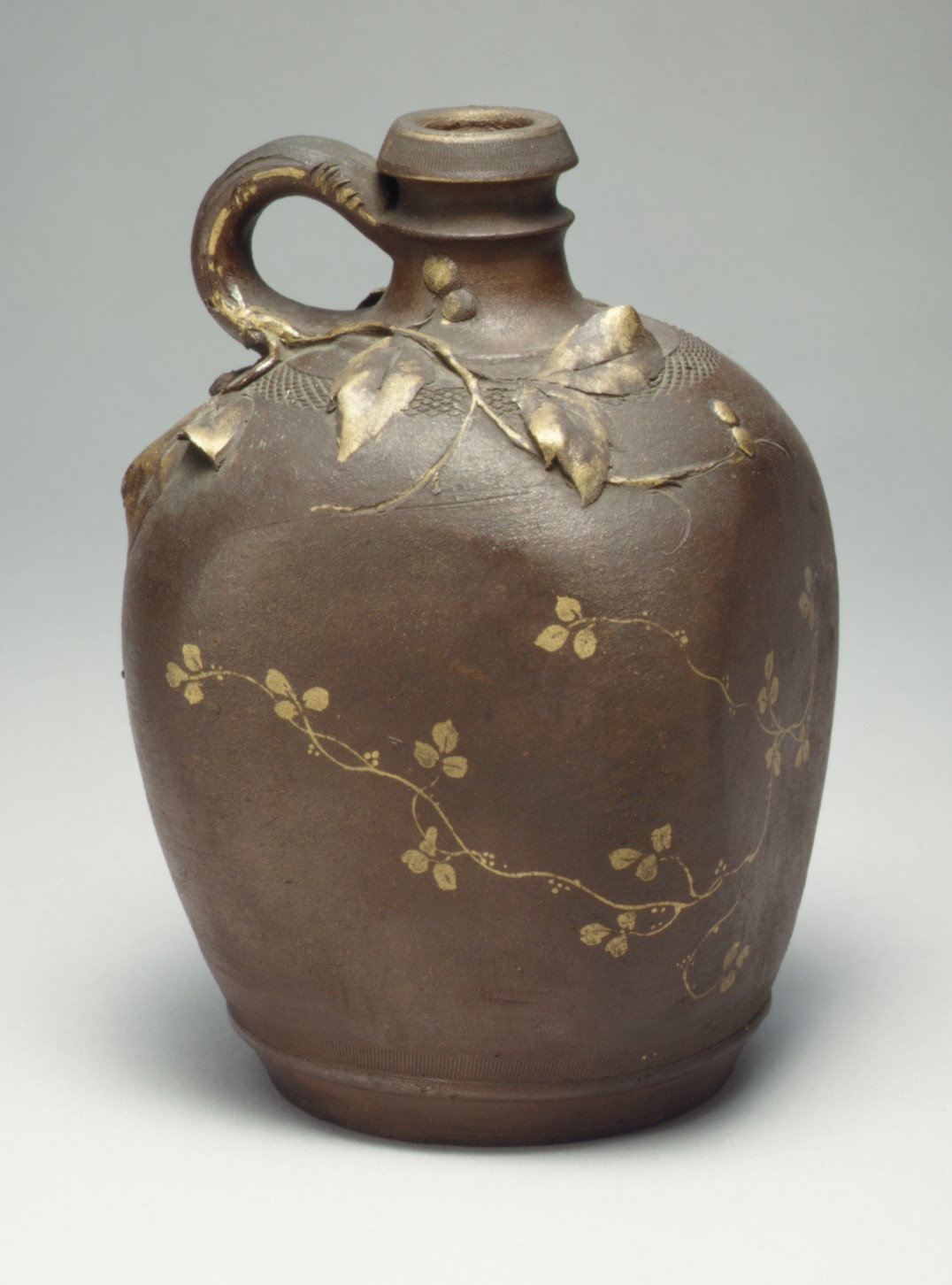
Stoneware jug, 1882-1886

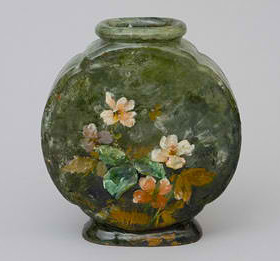
Vase designed by Ernest Chaplet

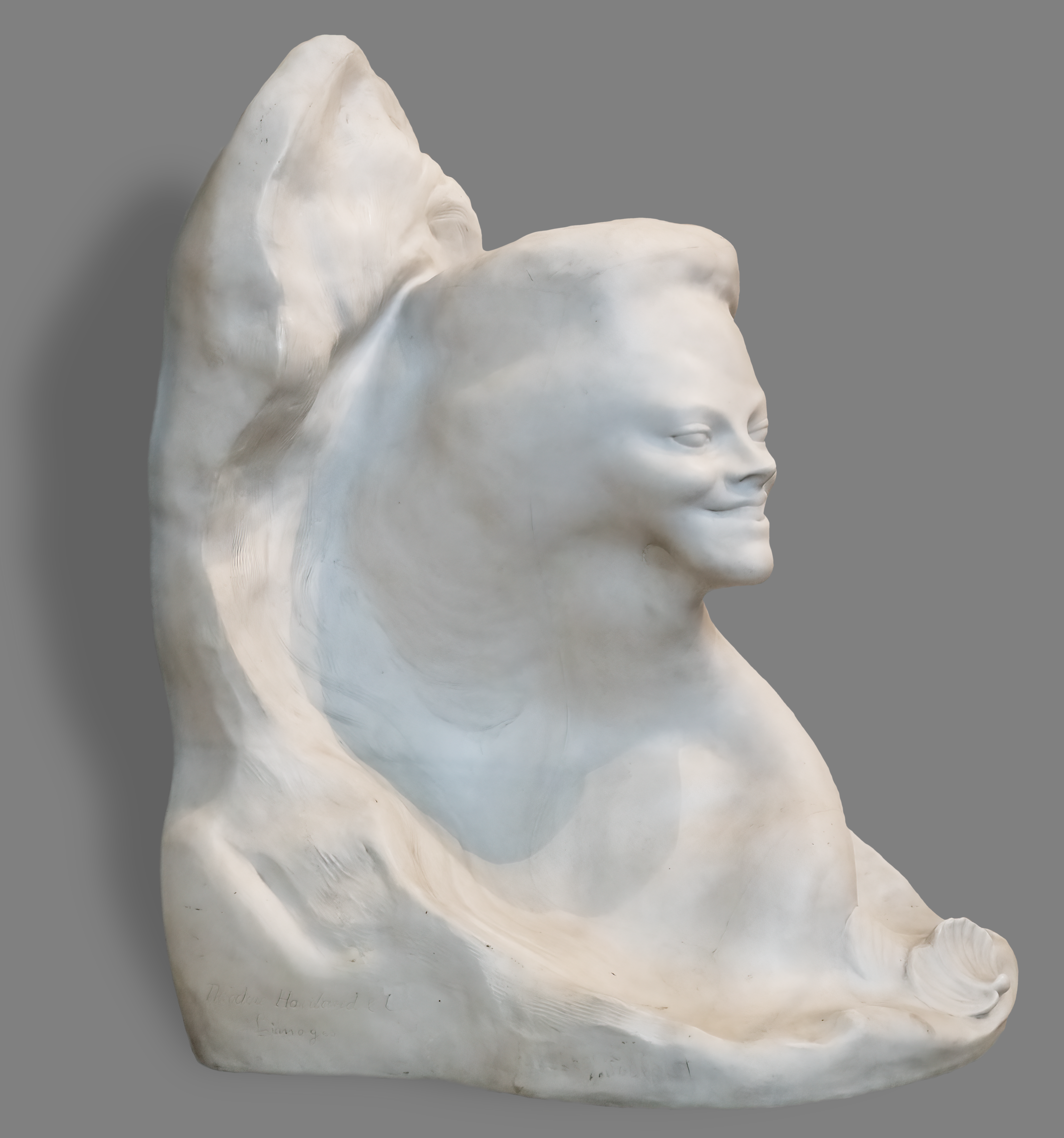
Buste of Jane Avril on wave 1898 - Antoine Bourdelle

== Bibliography ==
- Detweiler, Susan G. (1975). American Presidential China. Washington, D.C.: Smithsonian Institution.
