= Ernest Chaplet =

French designer, sculptor and ceramist (1835–1909)

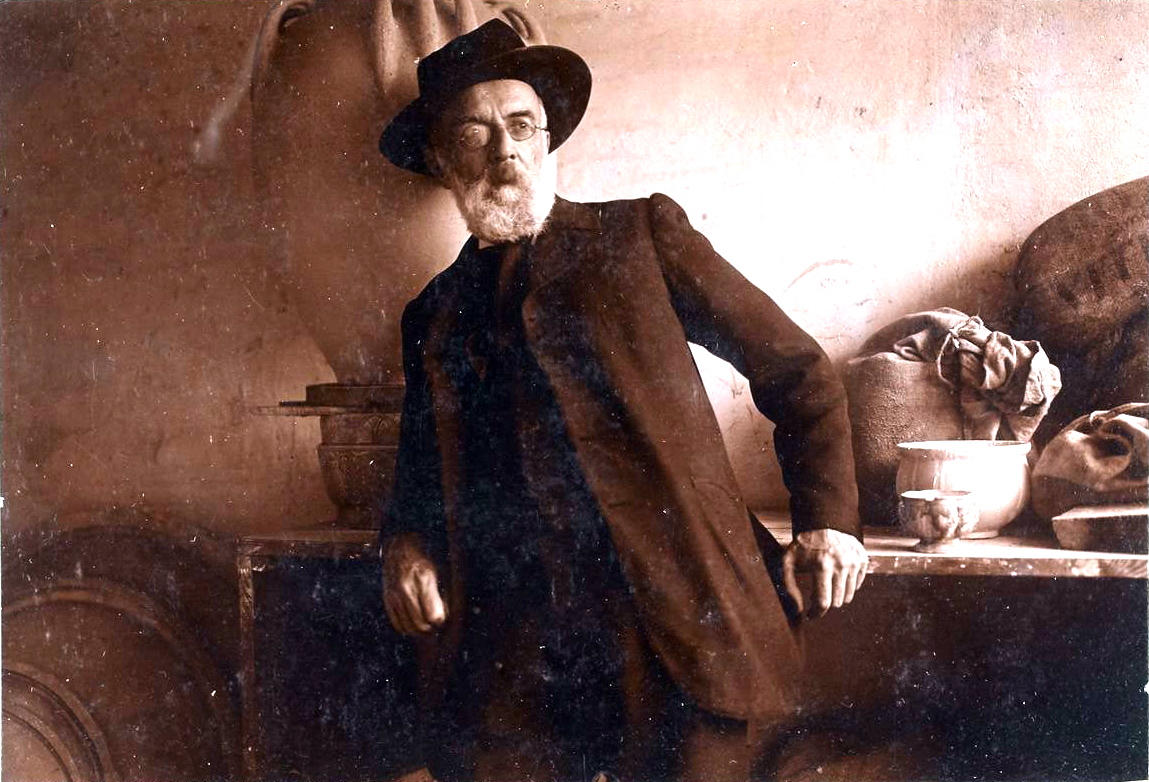
Ernest Chaplet by Dornac.

Ernest Chaplet (1835 in Sèvres – 1909 in Choisy-le-Roi) was a French designer, sculptor and ceramist. He was a key figure in the French art pottery movement, and his works are held in international public collections such as the Musée d'Orsay, Paris.

Having worked in industry for over 30 years, he opened an atelier with the sculptor Albert-Louis Dammouse in 1882, producing stoneware often influenced by Japanese designs and Chinese prototypes. From 1875 he worked with Félix Bracquemond. Chaplet became head of the Parisian workshops of Charles Haviland of Haviland & Co. in 1882, working in stoneware and porcelain for them. He worked on ceramics with Paul Gauguin from 1886; together they created some 55 stoneware pots with applied figures or ornamental fragments, multiple handles, painted and partially glazed. He later worked with Jules Dalou and Auguste Rodin.

From 1887 Chaplet took up permanent residence at Choisy-le-Roi, often collaborating with the ceramics manufacture Alexandre Bigot. He won acclaim at the 1900 International Exhibition, but lost his sight in 1904, after which his son-in-law Emile Lenoble took over his studio. He committed suicide in 1909.

== Gallery ==
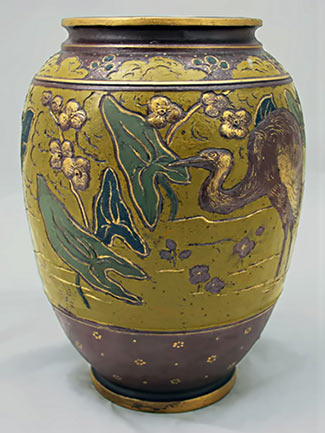
Ibis vase

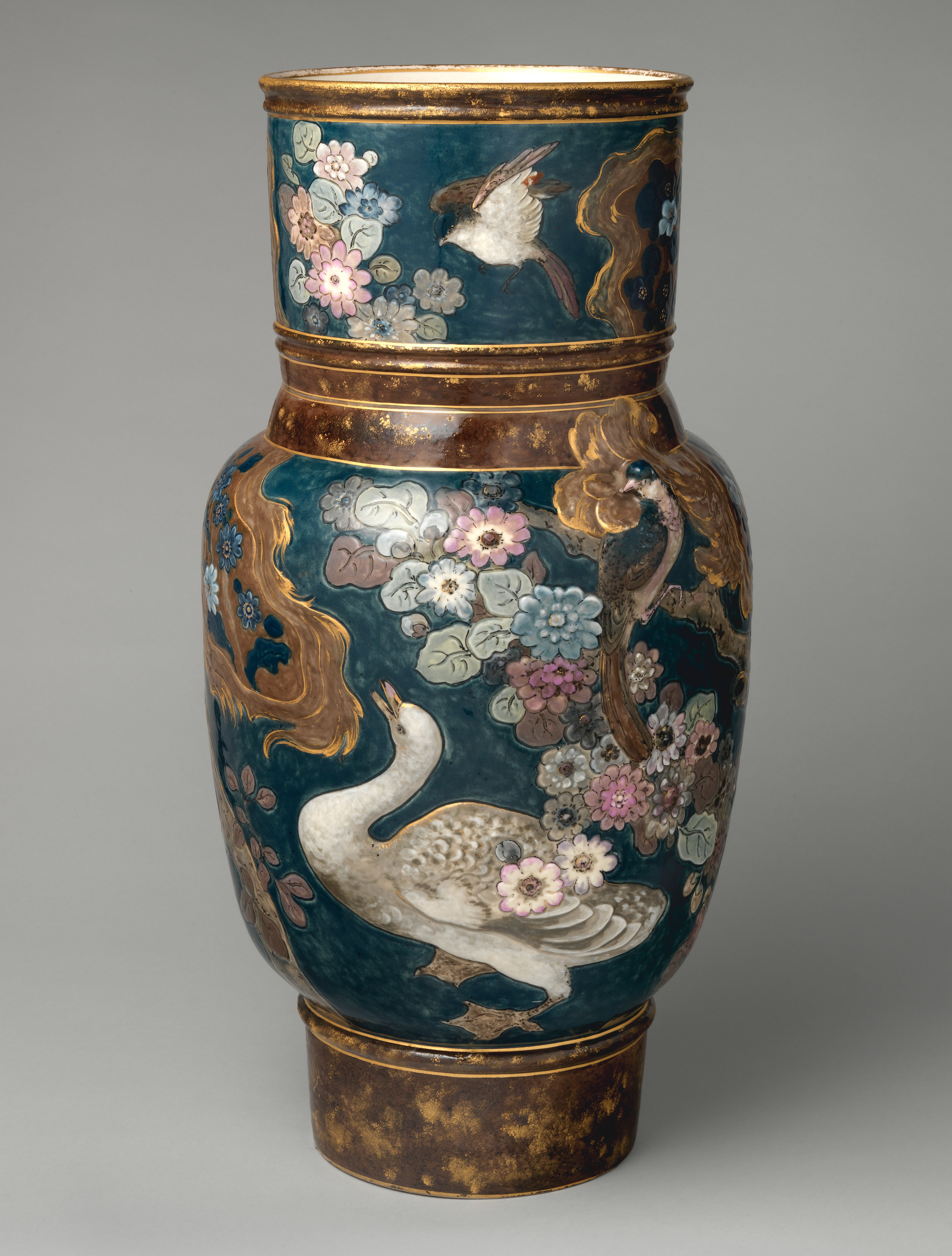
Porcelain vase with swan, Haviland & Co., 1880s

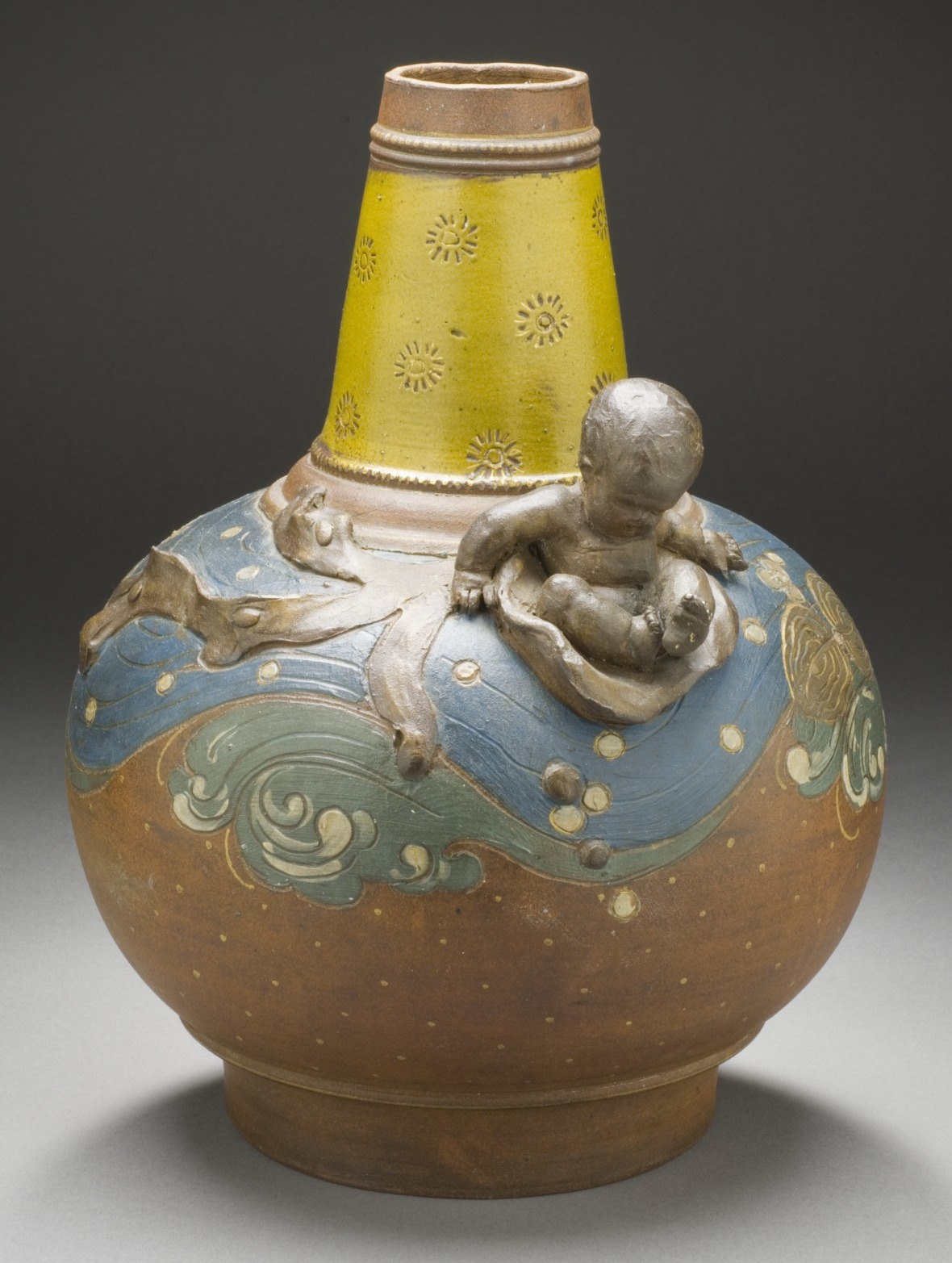
Stoneware vase, 1880s

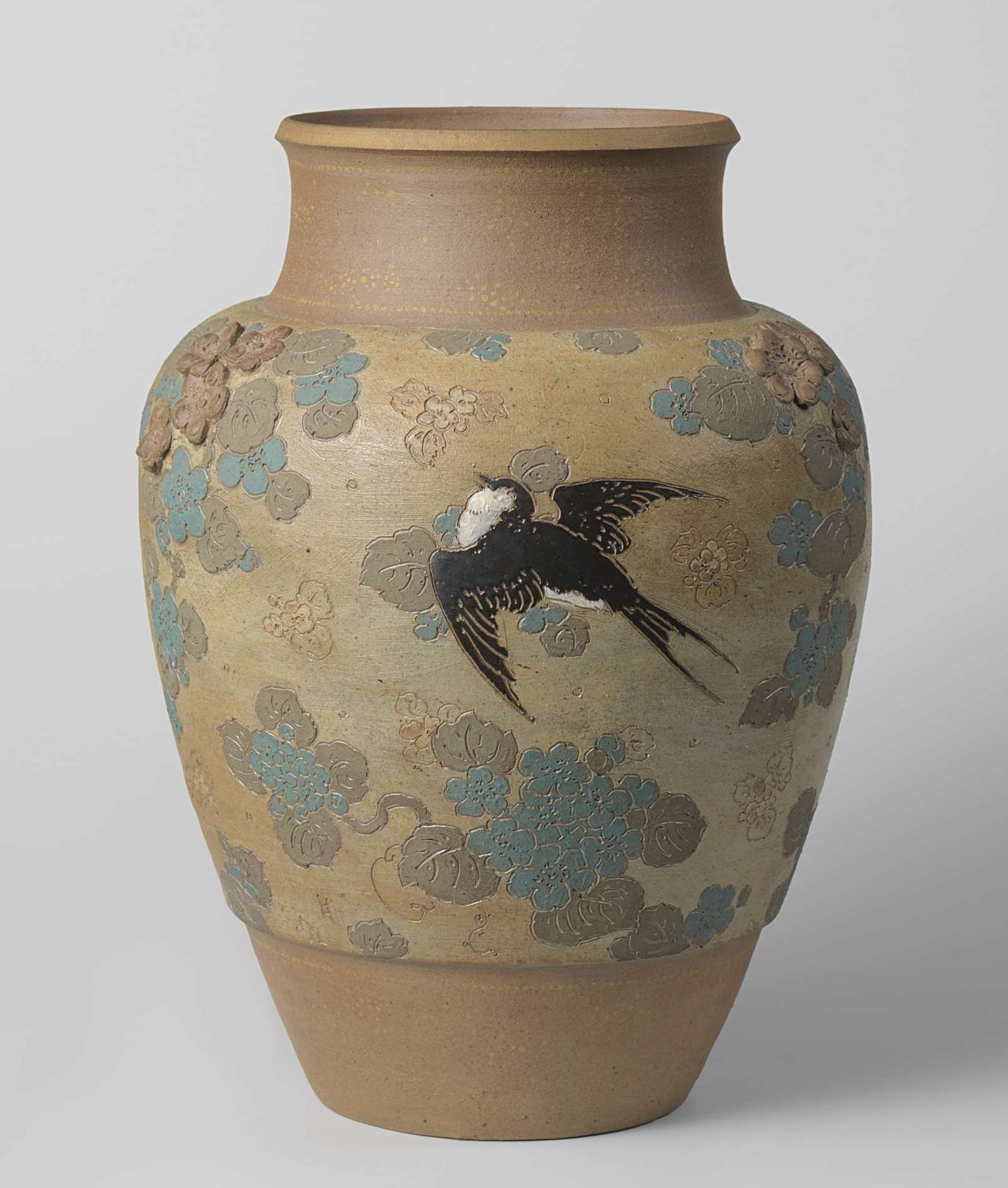
Stoneware vase with swallow, mid-1880s

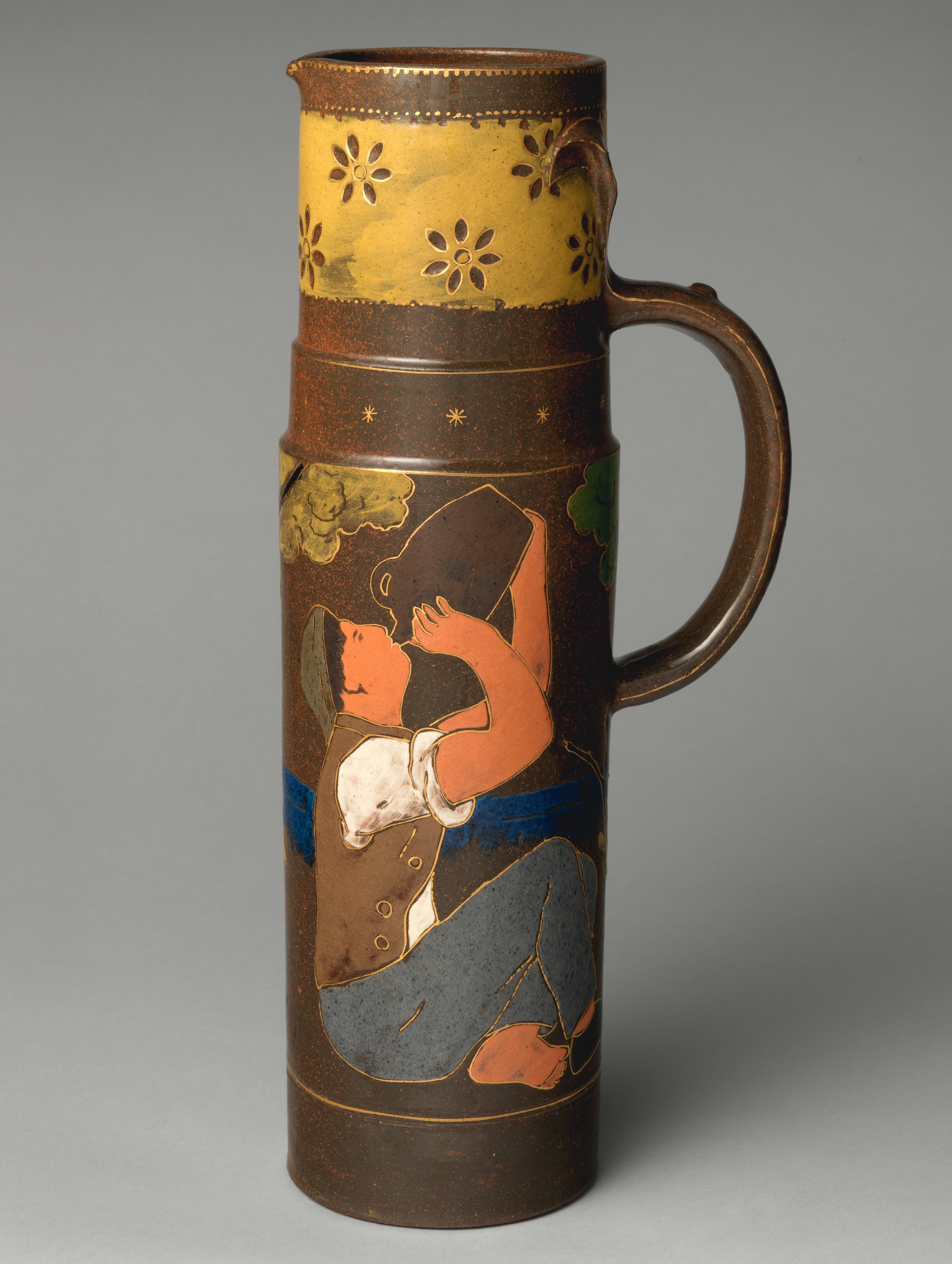
Stoneware tankard with man drinking from jug, Haviland & Co., mid-1880s

== Sources ==
- Benicka, Corinne. Great Modern Masters. Bookthrift, 1980. ISBN 978-0-8967-3047-2
- D'Albis, Jean. Ernest Chaplet. Knowledge Press, 1976
- Thiébaud, Philippe. La Revue du Musée d'Orsay, nr 2, February 1996, Paris
