= China service of the Lincoln administration =

Collection of White House porcelain

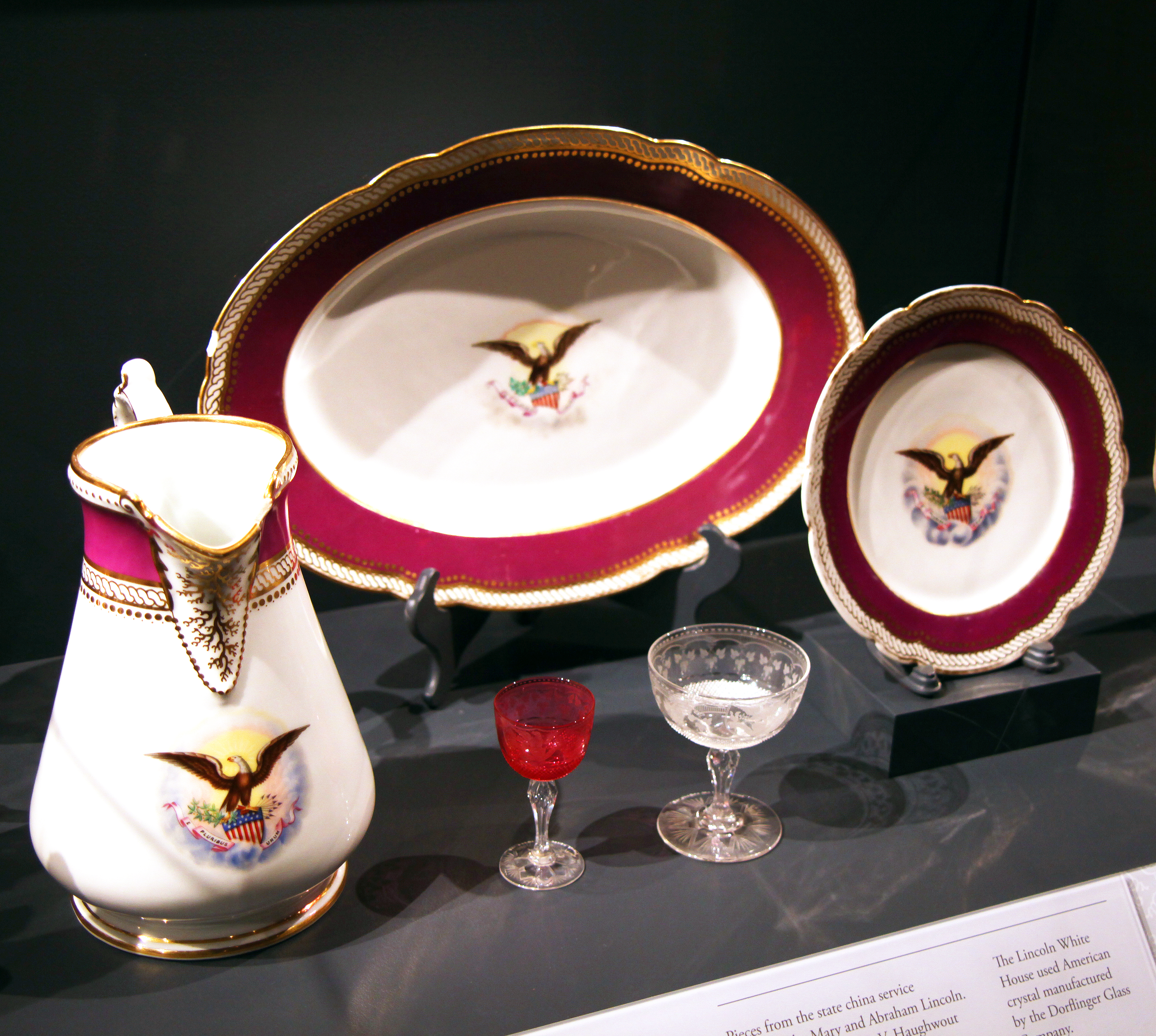
Pieces of the 1861 Lincoln "solferino" state china on display in the National Museum of American History in Washington, D.C.

The china service of the Lincoln administration generally refers to a set of purple-banded china (porcelain) dishes used for serving and eating food at the White House, home of the president of the United States for state dinners. Also known as the Lincoln solferino china service (in reference to the purple border), it was purchased in April 1861 by First Lady Mary Todd Lincoln. The porcelain was manufactured by Haviland & Co. in France, and some of the decoration of the china was made overseas. Additional decoration was made by the American firm of E. V. Haughwout & Co., which sold the china to Mrs. Lincoln.

Much of the china was broken or too chipped to be used by the end of the first Lincoln administration in 1865. A second set of much plainer buff-banded china was ordered in the Lincoln administration, and was used for family non-state entertaining. Mrs. Lincoln ordered or was given a third set of china with a pink border shortly before leaving the White House, and it was delivered to her private home.

The administration of Andrew Johnson ordered a second set of "Lincoln solferino china" in 1865, but some of this set did not survive Johnson's term in office. The administrations of Ulysses S. Grant, Chester Arthur, and Grover Cleveland also purchased replacement pieces.

Little of the original Lincoln china remains to this day. The largest collections are owned by the White House and the Smithsonian Institution, with several other smaller collections held by both public institutions and private collectors.

== Decision to purchase new china ==
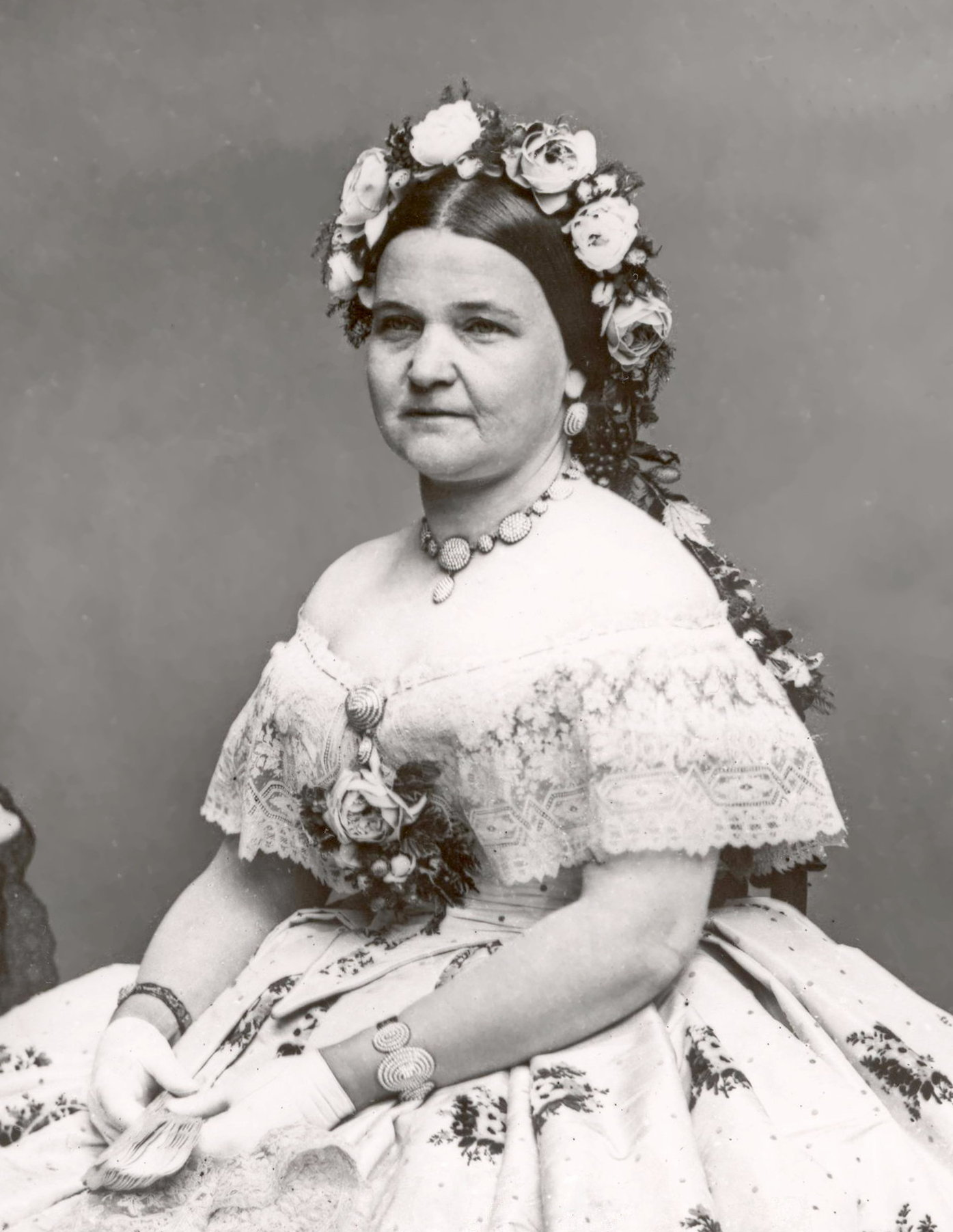
Mary Todd Lincoln in 1861

When the Lincolns moved into the White House in March 1861 (inaugurations did not move to January until the 1940s), they found it in a terrible state. Furniture throughout the executive mansion was broken, wallpaper was peeling off in many rooms, and the décor was cheap, shoddy, and tasteless. President James Buchanan, Lincoln's predecessor, was a lifelong bachelor. His niece, Harriet Lane, acted as hostess and de facto First Lady. Lane focused primarily on her hosting duties, rather than maintaining the White House. Although Congress allotted President Buchanan $20,000 ($691,071 in 2025 dollars) to refurbish the White House when he moved in, Buchanan spent nearly all these funds on building a glass conservatory adjacent to the mansion to replace an orangery on the east side of the White House built during the Jackson administration but torn down to make way for an expansion of the Treasury Building. (Note: The building had also been extensively modernized during the administration of James K. Polk (1845-1849). Coal gas lines were added throughout the structure to provide lighting, and a gas furnace installed in the basement to provide central heat. This meant that the wood-burning fireplaces in each room were no long used, reducing the amount of soot and smoke damage which attended their use. Plumbing and sewer lines were also added to the private quarters. Each bedroom now had a sink (with drainage into a sewer line, not a bucket) with two faucets (providing hot and cold water), and two flush toilets now existed in the family section.) Only two rooms were in acceptable condition: The Blue Room and the East Room. The Blue Room had been wallpapered and carpeted in 1837 during the administration of Martin Van Buren, and the Rococo Revival gilded wood furniture (a purchase of Harriet Lane's, financed by the auction of older White House furniture) had only arrived in December 1859. (Note: Congress authorized the White House to auction off used and broken furniture in 1797. Such auctions were a regular occurrence until 1903.) The centerpiece of this suite was a large circular settee with a central table for flowers. The East Room, which was largely unfurnished because it was used as a ballroom, retained its 1818 Federal style furniture (which had been reupholstered in 1829), 1839 silver wallpaper with gold border, and 1853 draperies, lace curtains, and carpet. The East Room, was nonetheless, somewhat shabby.

Mary Todd Lincoln discovered that the White House china – which had been purchased in the administration of Franklin Pierce in the early 1850s – was in a sorry state. There were only enough plates, cups, saucers, and serving dishes to serve about 10 guests, and what china remained was mismatched and damaged. Harriet Lane had purchased no new china during the Buchanan administration, limiting her purchases to crystal and gold spoons for use during tea parties and coffee receptions.

The President had access to certain public funds to maintain and furnish the White House. These included $5,000 a year ($179,167 in 2025 dollars) for redecorating the White House, and $6,000 a year ($215,000 in 2025 dollars) to make repairs to the structure.

== The first (solferino) Lincoln china set ==
=== The 1861 buying trip ===
Prior to the presidential inauguration, Mrs. Lincoln had spent January 11 to 22, 1861, in New York City shopping for clothes. During this time, she became acquainted with many of the city's finer merchants, and established accounts at several of them.

On May 10, 1861, Mrs. Lincoln traveled to New York City on a purchasing trip to redecorate the White House. She was accompanied by William S. Wood, interim Commissioner of Public Buildings; Colonel Robert Anderson, who defied the Confederacy by attempting to hold Fort Sumter in April 1861; Mrs. Elizabeth Todd Grimsley, her sister; and a niece. After a brief stop-over in Philadelphia, the entourage arrived in New York City late on May 11. With stores closed on Sunday, May 12, she spent May 13 and May 14 shopping for a carriage, clothes, furniture, and household goods at A. T. Stewart & Co., Lord & Taylor, and other stores.

=== Solferino design ===
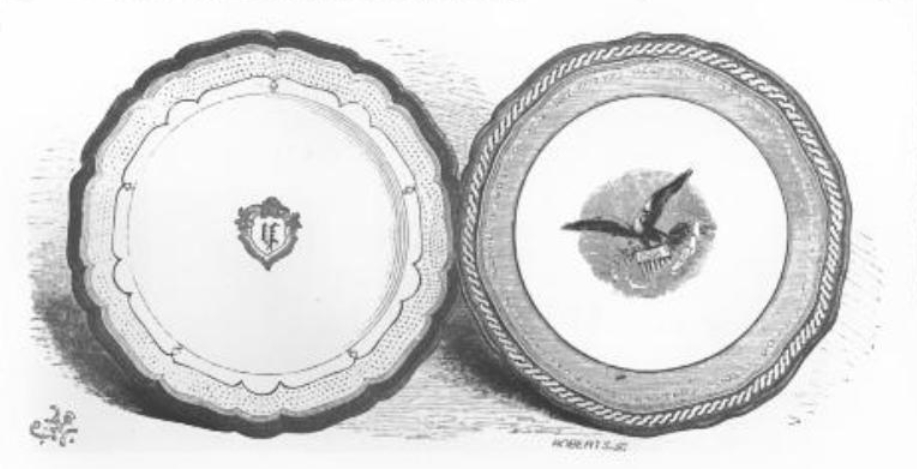
Demonstration plates created in 1853 for the Franklin Pierce administration served as the basis for the Lincoln "solferino" china.

On May 15, Mrs. Lincoln visited the china showroom of E. V. Haughwout & Co. Haughwout's showed her a "specimen plate" they had exhibited at the Crystal Palace Exhibition in New York in 1853. The company had produced the plate in the hopes that President Pierce would like it and buy a set of china based on its look. The "Pierce Plate" was a creamy white porcelain emblazoned with the arms of the United States. These depicted an America eagle in the Napoleonic style (slender wings outspread, slender neck and head, facing right, leaning left), gripping a shield emblazoned with the U.S. colors (white band at top rimmed in blue, with blue stars on the field, and narrow red and white stripes below). The shield tilted to the right, and the lower southeast corner was lost in rosy clouds which surrounded and were in back of the eagle. Drifting through the clouds left and right of the shield was a ribbon with the national motto ("E pluribus unum"). An olive branch extended to the left, and a sheaf of arrows to the right. A wide dark blue border, its outer rim dotted with tiny white stars, encircled the plate. The beyond that was a twisted gold rope ("in the Alhambra style"). The edges of the demonstration plate were lightly scalloped.

Mary Lincoln was thrilled with the design. She asked for only minimal changes. The most important was that the blue band be replaced with "solferino". Solferino was a moderate purplish-red color similar to magenta—a highly popular color at the time. A dye that could create the solferino color had only been discovered in 1859, so asking for solferino color was asking for the trendiest color then available. It was also close to purple, which was Mrs. Lincoln's favorite color. Mrs. Lincoln also asked that the edges of the plates be more heavily scalloped.

=== Solferino orders ===
Lincoln ordered 666 pieces of china for the White House. The dining service – which consisted of two large salad bowls, four pickle bowls, 18 meat platters of various sizes (ranging from 9 to 20 inches (23 to 51 cm) in diameter), four fish platters of various sizes, two butter dishes, six vegetable platters, 96 dinner plates, 48 soup bowls, four water pitchers, and two ice bowls – consisted of 190 pieces. The 208-piece dessert service consisted of custard cups, fruit bowls of various heights and sizes, strawberry bowls, sugar bowls, fruit baskets (some oval, some round), dessert plates, coffee cups, and two large shell-shaped bowls. The breakfast/tea service consisted of tea plates, preserve plates, coffee cups, egg cups, tea cups, and cake plates for a total of 260 pieces. She also ordered four "servers" (large plates for serving chocolates), two punch bowls, and four large centerpieces (white pelicans formed a pillar on top of which was a large platform on which dishes could be presented).

Mary Lincoln was so happy with the china service that she also ordered a small set for the family's personal use, and a "toilet set" for use in the family bedrooms. The toilet set was ordered on July 18, 1861, and consisted of two services. The one for Abraham and Mary Lincoln consisted of a ewer and basin, covered chamber pot, soap box, brush tray, jug, foot bath, and slop jar. It cost $45, and was decorated with the solferino border, although the Alhambra edging was replaced with a quatrefoil and tassel motif. The Great Seal of the United States was replaced with a Gothic "ML" in the center. A plain white toilet set, with the same items, formed the second set. This less fancy set cost just $24.50. Mrs. Lincoln ordered a third fancy toilet set, this one decorated with the U.S. coat of arms, on July 30. It appears intended for Mrs. Lincoln's bedroom, as it also included a ewer, sponge box, powder box, and pair of candlesticks. The cost of the third toilet set was $115.

=== Manufacture of the Solferino set ===
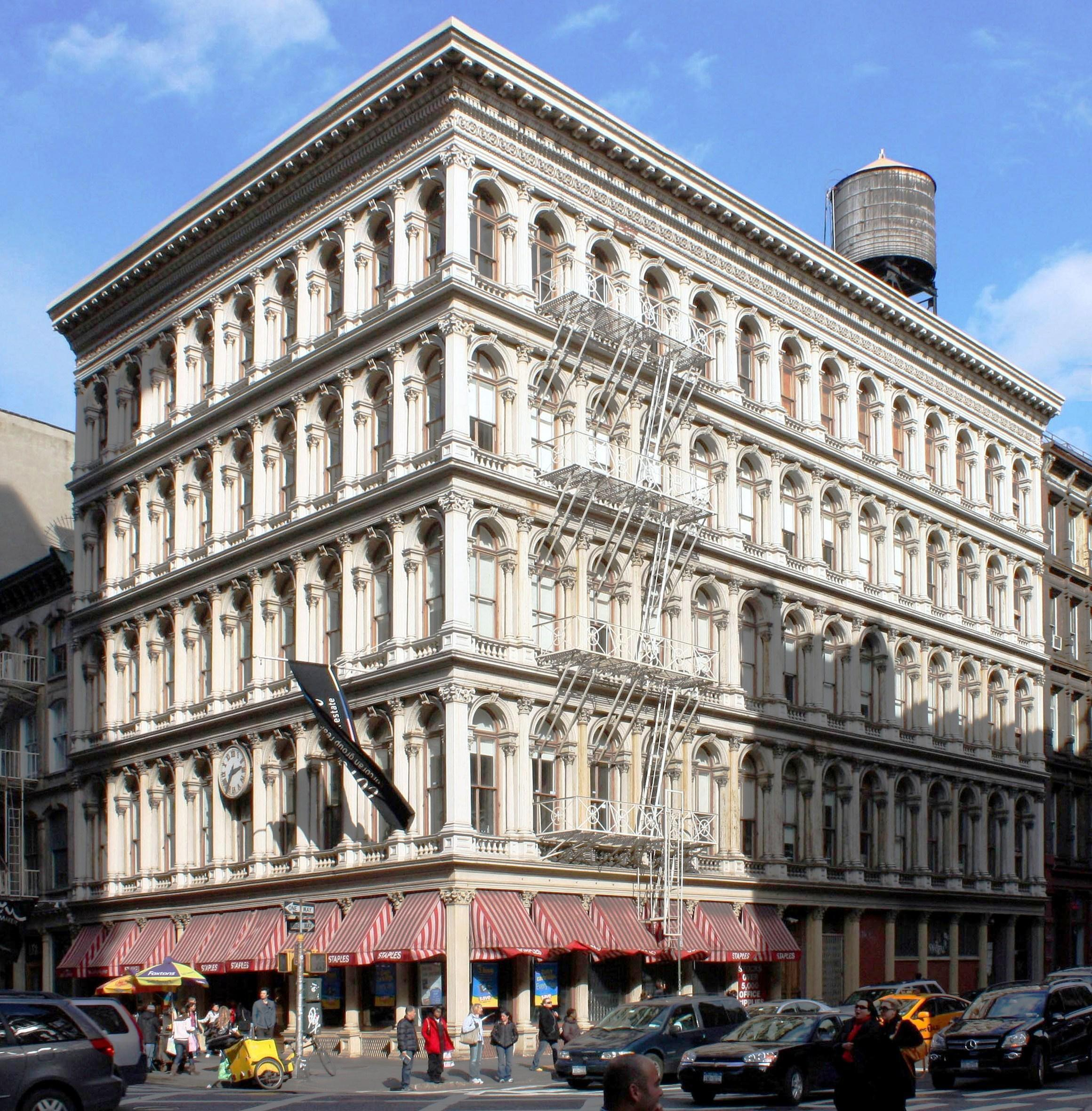
The E.V. Haughwout Building in New York City, which Mary Todd Lincoln visited in April 1861 and where most of the decoration was added to the "solferino" china service

The china was produced by Haviland & Co. in Limoges, France. American porcelain manufacturers simply were not up to the task of producing fine china, and could not have produced as many pieces as Mrs. Lincoln wished. Haviland undoubtedly gilded the edges with the gold rope and painted the solferino band on the plate, then shipped it to New York City. The Haughwout company finished the decorating. A stencil was used to create an outline of the image, which was then painted in by hand. (Note: This technique was called "enluminage". Developed by David Haviland himself, the decoration was first engraved on a copper plate. The copper plate was dusted with the color to be transferred, and a special piece of paper pressed against the copper plate to pick up the color. The color was then transferred to the porcelain plate, creating an outline of the decoration. The outline was then filled in by hand.)

The final design was slightly different from the Pierce plate. The Lincoln eagle faced left, not right; the clouds only formed the lower arc of a circle, and obscured the southwest corner of the shield; the olive branch was more prominent, and the arrows less numerous; and a glowing yellow sun (not glowing clouds) backed the eagle. The stars around the outer edge of the solferino band were now just gilt dots.

=== Silverware and glassware orders ===
Mrs. Lincoln also ordered three dozen gilded silver forks, 10 dozen silver-plated and iron-handled dinner knives ($240), and six dozen dessert knives ($120). She also had an older gold-plated flatware set regilded at a cost of either $1,783 or $2,343. E.V. Haughwout & Co. provided both the new dining utensils and the regilding. (Note: White House gardener John Watt alleged that the cost of the silverware was $6,000, and that Mary Lincoln tried to hide this cost by claiming it was for regilding of lighting fixtures.)

She completed her purchases by ordering glassware. She purchased the glassware on July 3, 1861, from A. P. Zimaudy (Note: Many sources list the name of the firm as "Zimandy", but the original invoice in the National Archives clearly spells the name "Zimaudy".) of Washington, D.C. This $1,500 set of glassware was richly cut and one side inscribed with the U.S. coat of arms. The glassware was manufactured by Christian Dorflinger, a company based in Brooklyn, New York, and was much thinner and lighter than the typical White House heavy crystal which had been used since the Andrew Jackson administration. Small flowers were depicted on the sides and backs of the glassware. A decorative border of umbrella-like shapes was etched into the lip, and the base featured a star and fan of spreading rays. The exact content of the glassware order is not clear, but probably included four dozen complete settings (water glass, red wine glass, white wine glass, champagne flute, dessert wine glass, and all-purpose glass) as well as some serving dishes. White House glassware historian Jane Shadel Spillman believes the glassware collection was probably similar to a "presentation" set given to Japanese diplomats by E.V. Haughwout the year before. This presentation set included goblets, champagne glasses, wine glasses, claret glasses, green-tinted hock glasses, (Note: A hock glass is a tall wine glass with a delicate stem and small bowl. It was usually used for drinking white wine from Germany, such as a Riesling.) cordial glasses, quart- and pint-size decanters, claret decanters, bowls, side dishes, finger bowls, and saltcellars. The setting also probably included punch bowls, double-handled punch cups, ice cream plates, carafes, sugar bowls, and celery vases. Among the known serving dishes were a relish dish and a compote dish.

=== Solferino cost ===
The White House china set cost $3,195. (The family's personal china, which Mrs. Lincoln bought at a discount since it was ordered at the same time as the government-owned set, cost $1,106.37.) She turned the invoice for the publicly owned china over to the federal government for payment. (Note: The New York World newspaper inaccurately reported in September 1864 that the china cost $800, and that Mary Lincoln attempted to have $1,400 in other purchases added to the china bill in order to hide her profligate spending habits. Haughwout & Co. vehemently denied the charge publicly.)

Mrs. Lincoln saw the "solferino" china during a return trip to New York City in August 1861, and approved its delivery. E.V. Haughwout delivered the china on September 2, 1861. Some scholars claim Abraham Lincoln thought the expense too much, and refused to pay it. This appears to be a myth, as Lincoln approved the invoice a week before the china was received, and the federal government paid the invoice on September 16, 1861. (Note: It is true that Mary Todd Lincoln overspent significantly in refurbishing the White House generally, and President Lincoln was very angry over the expenditures. Congress eventually passed two additional appropriations to cover these expenses.)

The Lincoln china was the first State Dinner Service chosen entirely by a First Lady, and the most complete set of dinnerware ever assembled at the White House up to that time.

=== Loss of the "solferino" set ===
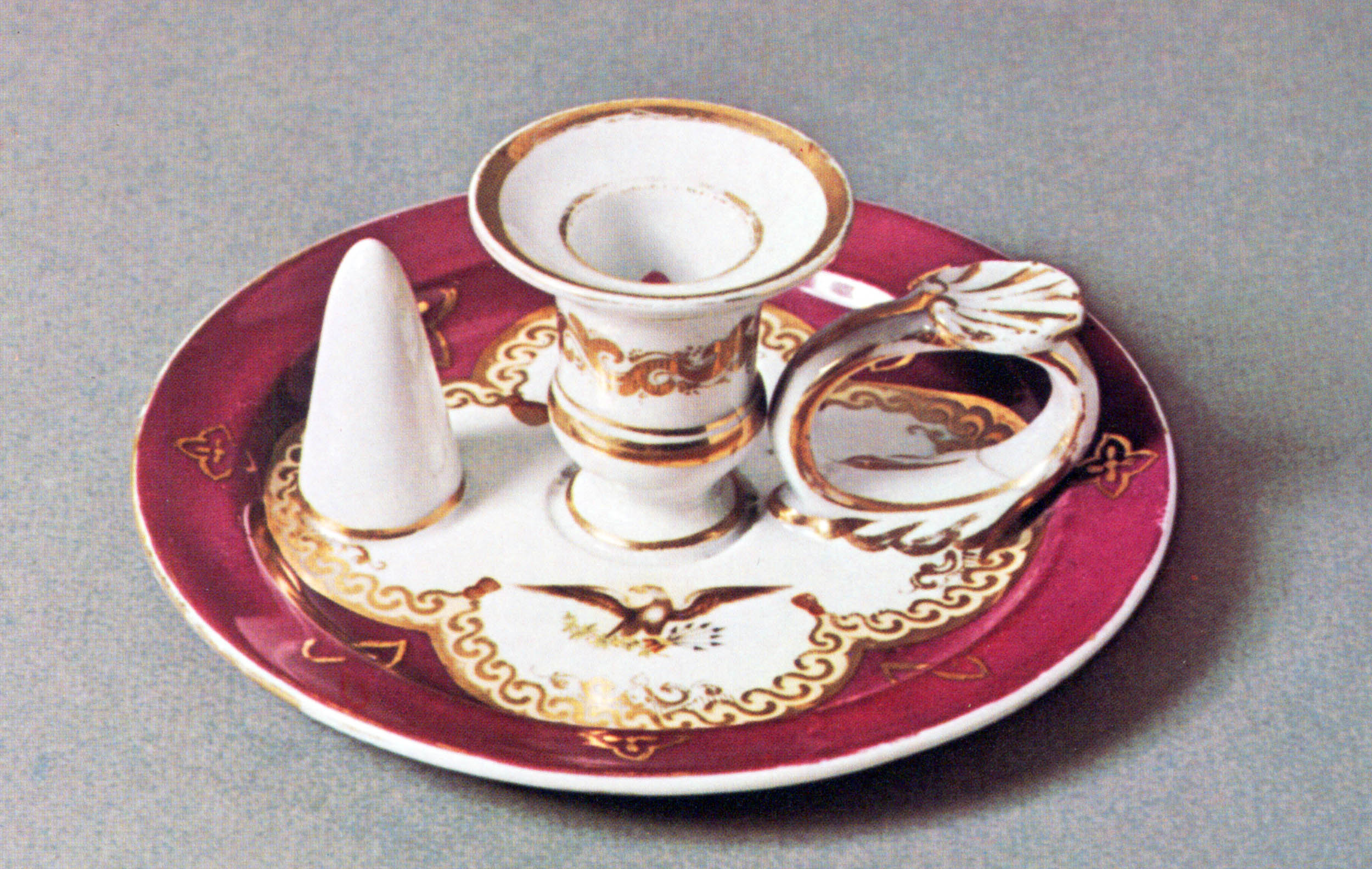
Candlestick holder and cap, part of the "solferino" third toilet set ordered by Mrs. Lincoln in July 1861

By late 1864, much of the "solferino" china set had been damaged or broken. During Willie Lincoln's funeral in February 1862, much of it had been damaged, and mourners and souvenir-seekers made off with a number of pieces. There was so little of it left by November 1864 that Mrs. Lincoln was forced to purchase a dozen teacups with a simple colored band from the D.C. firm of Webb and Beveridge in order to host a tea party. (This simple set cost $11.)

What remained of the "solferino" china, some of the buff china, crystal, and flatware was stolen by servants and others in the weeks after Lincoln's assassination. Some crystal and buff china were seen for sale in a second-hand shop in Georgetown, and the large punch bowl made its way to Shaw's saloon in Baltimore. Benjamin Brown French, Commissioner of Public Buildings, was accused of having made off with much of it. At congressional hearings into the issue, French implied that Mrs. Lincoln had stolen the items herself.

When Mary Todd Lincoln turned the White House over to Andrew Johnson on May 26, 1865, only three partial place settings, some teacups, and some odds and ends were left of the "solferino" set. Smithsonian Institution historian Susan Detweiler believes that these three settings consisted of pieces of the Pierce and Polk china, plus pieces of either the Lincoln "solferino" or buff band china.

=== Post-Lincoln re-orders of the "solferino" set ===
In July 1865, President Andrew Johnson asked Haughwout & Co. to make an inventory of the White House china and silver, and to make replacements as necessary. Congress subsequently made a $30,000 appropriation at the end of 1865 to pay for the general refurbishment of the house (which included the china and silver replacements). The administration replaced the entire "solferino" china set with an identical set on January 17, 1866, also manufactured by Haviland and decorated by E. V. Haughwout and Company. This china is different from the 1861 set, as both the outline and the colors were done by hand (no stencil was used). This second order of "Lincoln china" consisted of 391 pieces, and included pickle dishes, custard cups, egg cups, serving dishes of various depths, compote dishes, sugar bowls, baskets, butter dishes, dinner plates, dessert plates, tea plates, soup plates, preserve plates, breakfast coffee cups, regular coffee cups, tea cups, water pitchers, and one salad bowl, cake plate, and ice bowl. There is little documentary evidence, but oral tradition claims that E.V. Haughwout contracted with Edward Lycett, the most famous china painter in the United States at the time, to decorate the china. (Note: The silver replacements also arrived in 1866.) Glassware was also reordered from Haughwout & Co. in 1866, and manufactured by the New England Glass Co. of Cambridge, Massachusetts.

But this service did not last long, either. An inventory taken on February 28, 1867, showed that some of the original "solferino" and the Johnson replacement "solferino" survived, along with some of the crystal plates and cut glass. E. V. Haughwout estimated the value of the remaining pieces at $22,000.

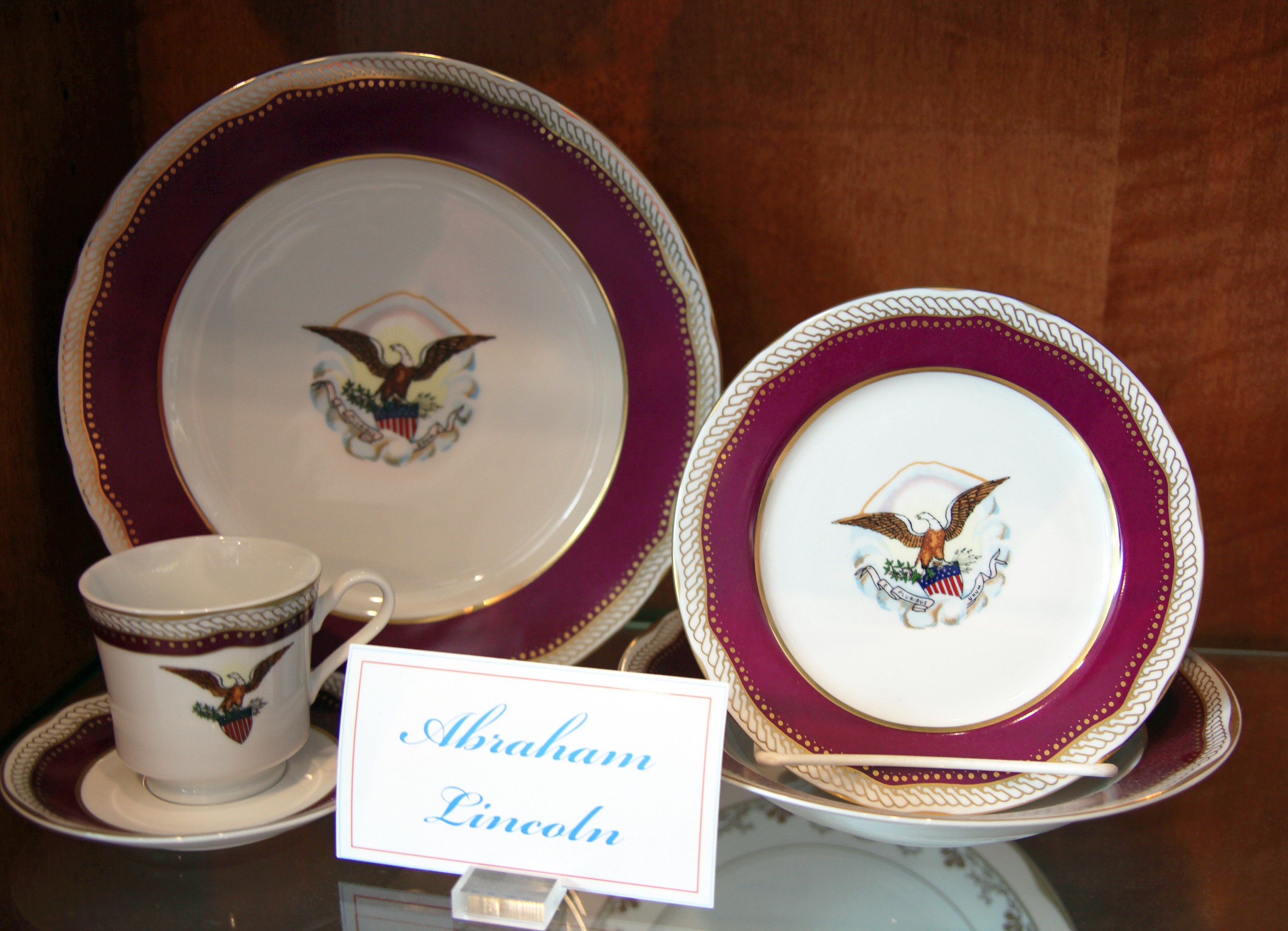
Reproduction "solferino" china, such as this set for sale at the Richard Nixon Presidential Library and Museum in 2012, began to be sold as early as 1876.

The Grant administration ordered 275 replacements (which included 72 cups and saucers) for the Johnson "solferino" set in 1873. It was delivered on December 10, 1873. The porcelain was manufactured by Haviland and imported and decorated by the firm of J. W. Boteler and Brother of Washington, D.C. The service consisted of plates in three sizes, compote dishes, and cups and saucers, and cost $1,207.21. This china may be identified by the words "Fabriqué par Haviland & Co./Pour/J. W. Boteler & Bro./Washington", which is painted or stamped on the back. By the end of the first Grant administration, there was not enough left to set dinner for eight or nine people. (Note: The Grant administration also ordered replacement glassware in 1873, in the same style as the Lincoln glassware. This was supplied by Hoare & Dailey/Corning Glass Works of Corning, New York.)

An extensive survey of the White House china was made personally by Chester Arthur and doorkeeper Charles Loeffler in autumn 1881. (Note: Arthur ascended to the presidency after the death of President James A. Garfield on September 19, 1881, three months after being shot at a train station in Washington, D.C.) Three full sets of china were discovered: The Lincoln "solferino" set (made up of replacement orders from the Johnson and Grant administrations), the Grant flower-and-buff band china set, and the Rutherford B. Hayes china set. In July 1884, Arthur made a replacement order for the Lincoln "solferino" china. This order was also manufactured by Haviland, and consisted of 30 dishes. This china also had "Fabriqué par Haviland & Co./Pour/J. W. Boteler & Bro./Washington" on the back. The cost of these replacements was $150. (Note: Although the Arthur administration made no reorder of the Lincoln glassware, the first Cleveland administration did. The reorder was made in 1885 and provided by T. G. Hawkes of Corning, New York.)

A final Lincoln "solferino" reorder was placed in 1894 during the second administration of Grover Cleveland. Once more, Haviland manufactured the blanks, and J.W. Boteler & Son decorated the pieces in the United States.

Beginning in 1876, reproduction pieces of the "solferino" china were produced in the United States. Haviland did not begin stamping their name on the back of their china until 1876. A large number of reproduction china services, made of hard-paste porcelain and stamped "Administration/Abraham Lincoln" (in black or red color) on the back, were made for sale at the Centennial Exposition in Philadelphia in 1876. After Edith Roosevelt, wife of President Theodore Roosevelt, showed intense interest in previous White House China in 1902, the firm of Dulin & Martin began offering copies of the Lincoln "solferino" and other presidential china sets for sale to the public. Much of the "Lincoln china" which collectors have in their possession is reproduction china; the original china ordered by Mrs. Lincoln and Mrs. Andrew Johnson have no markings on the back.

In the early 1960s, Jacqueline Kennedy would often use the Lincoln "solferino" china as serving plates. By May 1964, there remained enough of the Lincoln "solferino" china replacements to completely set two tables (about 12 place settings). During the Ford administration, Betty Ford would often use the Lincoln "solferino" to serve individual courses at small formal occasions, or for family dining.

== The second (buff) Lincoln china set ==
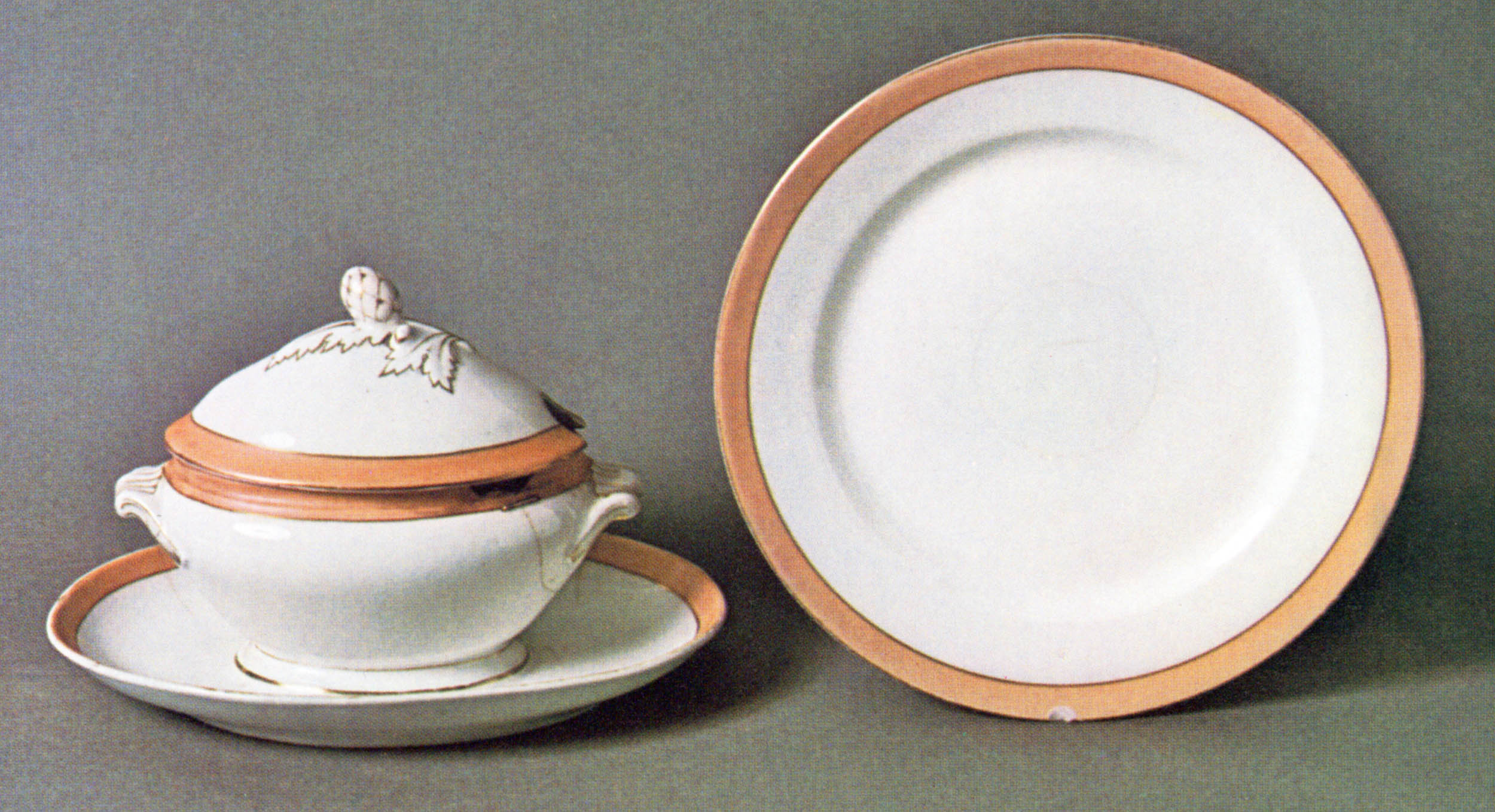
Sugar bowl and dinner plate which formed part of the "Lincoln buff" china service ordered in late 1864

In late 1864, Mrs. Lincoln ordered a new set of china for family, non-state dinners in the White House. This time, the importer was China Hall, a company owned by James K. Kerr of Philadelphia. The design this time was extremely simple: A white plate, with a buff border edged in gilt lines. This 511-piece set consisted of dining plates, soup plates, dessert plates, ice cream plates, a wide variety of dishes (large and small fish platters, vegetable platters, side dish platters), tureens, sauce boats, pickle dishes, salad bowls, custard cups, fruit baskets (round and oval), fruit platters, sugar bowls, coffee cups and saucers, and other items. This 181-piece set cost $1,700, and was billed on January 30, 1865. It's not clear which firm manufactured the china, but it is clearly of French manufacture.

Glassware was also replenished at this time. Mrs. Lincoln ordered 24 plain cut goblets (probably for family dining) in November 1864 and January 1865 from the D.C. firm of Webb & Beveridge. The cost was just $30. On January 30, 1865, she also ordered glassware to replace broken and stolen glassware for public events from John Kerr's China Hall, at a cost of $612.50. This service included four dozen each of goblets, champagne glasses, claret glasses, burgundy glasses, madeira glasses, sherry glasses, hock glasses, and cordial glasses. The bases appear to have been plain (unlike the 1861 order), except for the madeira glasses—which were more richly carved and featured the rays on the foot. The hock glasses were ruby (not green) in color, and the madeira glasses may also have been red colored. She ordered another four decanters on March 25.

On February 20, Mrs. Lincoln made an addition order of coffee cups and saucers, water pitchers, and bowls. These 24 items were in the same style, and cost $173.50.

The main set of china arrived in the United States via express shipment on February 13, 1865. The remaining 46 pieces arrived a few weeks later. But it was probably delivered just days before Abraham Lincoln was assassinated on April 15, 1865.

The receipt for the "Second Administration" buff china was delivered shortly after Andrew Johnson became president. The bill for the main china order and glassware was paid on August 29, 1865, and the bill for the additional china paid on February 10, 1866.

=== Loss of the Lincoln buff china set ===
An inventory of White House furnishings taken on May 26, 1865, showed that nearly the entire buff band china service had survived. It appeared to be inferior or roughly handled, however, and much of it broke over the next two years. An inventory dated February 28, 1867, indicated that only a few pieces of this set remained.

In the late 1800s, much of the buff china service was collected by Admiral Francis W. Dickins, a noted collector of porcelain. He misattributed this china to the administration of James Monroe, an error which was perpetuated by scholars and nonexperts alike for many years. Individual collectors often misidentify this china as also having come from the Monroe administration. The White House, too, often misattributed the china, mixing it with buff banded china ordered during the Grant administration. This problem with the White House china collection was rectified in 1958. Mamie Eisenhower, a fan of beautiful china, asked the Smithsonian Institution to assist her in researching and cataloguing correctly the White House china collection. This led to the correct identification of the buff band china with the Lincoln administration.

== The third (pink) Lincoln china set ==
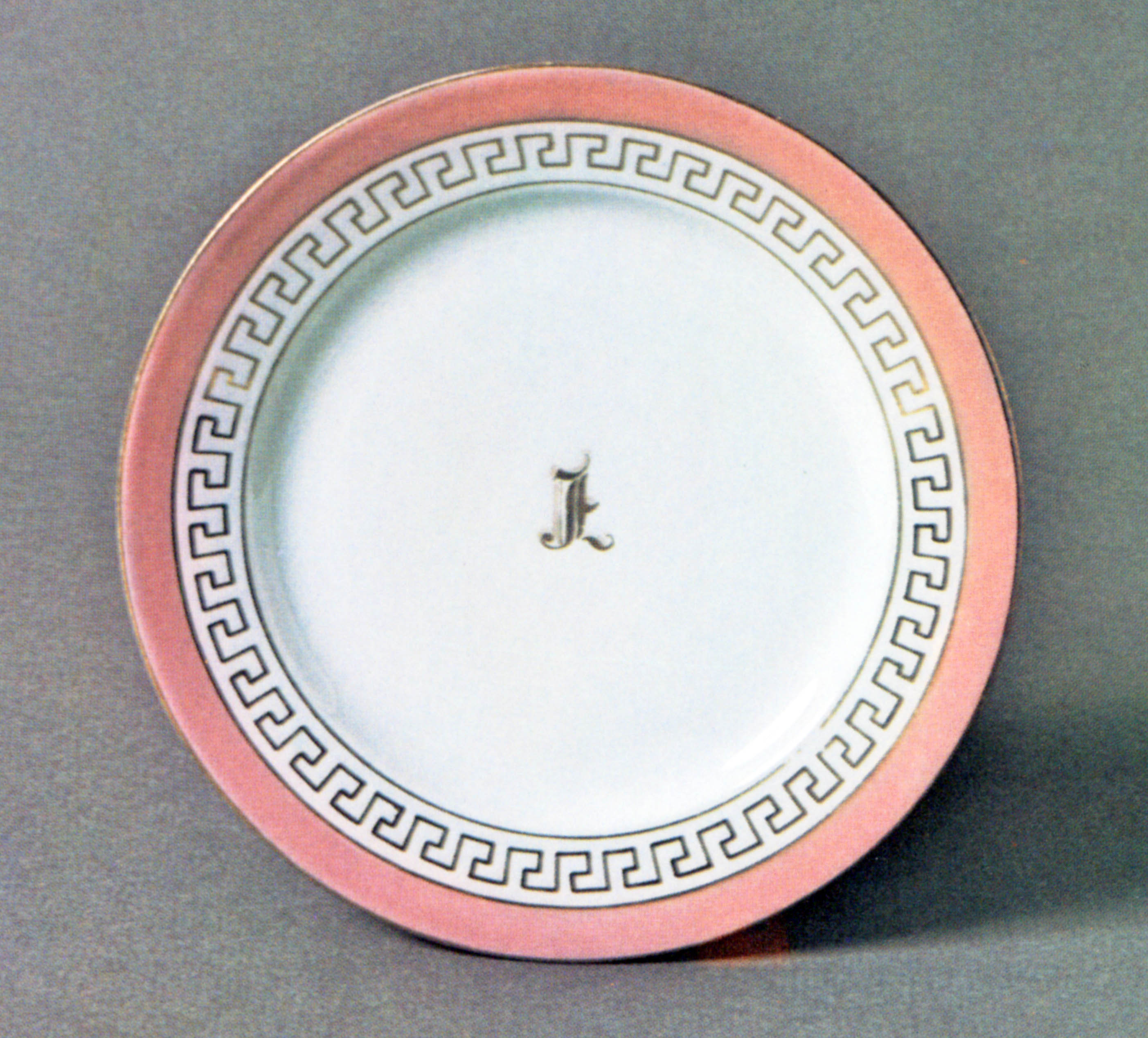
The third, "pink" Lincoln china service, which arrived after President Lincoln's death and which was never used in the White House

In early 1865, Mrs. Lincoln ordered yet a third set of china. Records regarding this set are minimal, and it is unclear if it was purchased or was a gift from the manufacturer. The set was clearly ordered by Mrs. Lincoln before May 26, 1865, but did not arrive until after July 26, 1865 (once she had left Washington, D.C., and settled at the Hyde Park Hotel in Hyde Park, Illinois).

The "pink set" was provided by James K. Kerr of Philadelphia. The china has a pink border. Inside the border is a gold Greek fret motif, and a gold monogram capital letter "L" is centered in the plates and saucers. Kerr most likely decorated the piece, or at least provided the gilding and monogram.

== Importance of the Lincoln china sets ==
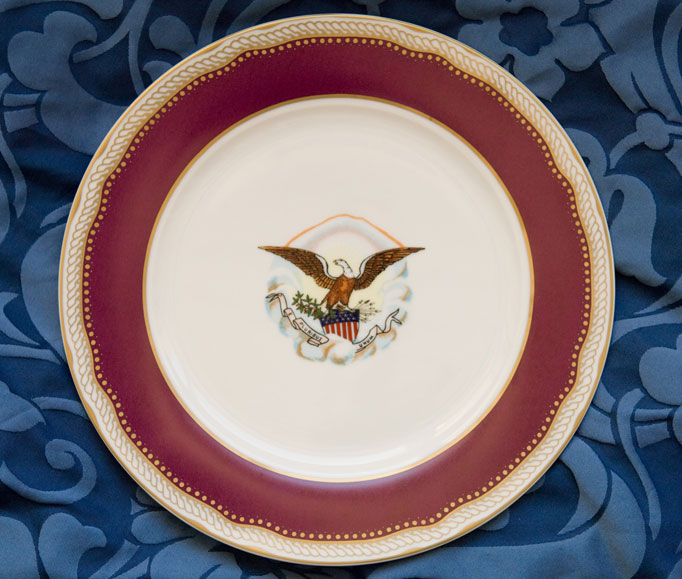
A reproduction of the Lincoln "solferino" china, created for the Inaugural Luncheon of President Barack Obama in 2009

The Lincoln "solferino" china service is considered one of the most beautiful ever purchased by the White House. The "solferino" china also has deeply influenced other china sets purchased by the president. In 1891, Caroline Harrison, wife of President Benjamin Harrison, ordered a new state china service that used the same blank as the "solferino" set. The U.S. coat of arms was an adaptation of the one used on the Lincoln china set. David Barquist, curator of the Philadelphia Museum of Art, has noted that while the Lincoln "solferino" china set was reviled as pretentious when unveiled, it later "became so popular it was one of the most reordered sets." Food for the Inaugural Luncheon of President Barack Obama in January 2009 was served on a reproduction of the Lincoln "solferino" service.

As of 2009, Lincoln china was some of the most sought-after presidential china by collectors. While most White House china plates were sold at auction for about $4,000 to $6,000, Lincoln "solferino" plates sold for $14,100. "Solferino" souvenir plates were much less sought after, however, and could be found for just $300.

== Current Lincoln china collections ==
The Smithsonian Institution in Washington, D.C.; The Henry Ford museum in Dearborn, Michigan; the Chicago Historical Society in Chicago, Illinois; and the Philadelphia Museum of Art in Philadelphia, Pennsylvania, all have good collections of the Lincoln "solferino" china. Many private collectors also have pieces.

The Smithsonian Institution and the White House also have pieces of the buff china in their collections. Individual collectors have pieces as well, although these are often misidentified as coming from the Monroe or Grant administrations.

The Lincoln family's personal set of "solferino" china stayed in the family for many years before being sold. It was last in the possession of Henry Horner, governor of Illinois, at the time of his death in 1940. Robert Todd Lincoln Beckwith, the great-grandson of Abraham Lincoln, also retained some of the personal "solferino" china (as well as some of the silverware). It is unclear which of the three institutions which benefitted from Beckwith's will (Iowa Wesleyan College, the American Red Cross, and the Church of Christ, Scientist) received the china and silver, or if it was sold at auction.

== See also ==
- China Room
- White House china

== Bibliography ==
- Baker, Jean H. (1987). Mary Todd Lincoln: A Biography. New York: W.W. Norton & Company. ISBN 0393024369.
- Burlingame, Michael (1994). The Inner World of Abraham Lincoln. Urbana, Ill.: University of Chicago Press. ISBN 0252020863.
- Burlingame, Michael (2006). "Mary Todd Lincoln's Unethical Conduct as First Lady". At Lincoln's Side: John Hay's Civil War Correspondence and Selected Writings. Carbondale, Ill.: Southern Illinois University Press. ISBN 0809322935.
- Craughwell, Thomas J. (2011). Presidential Payola: The True Stories of Monetary Scandals in the Oval Office That Robbed Tax Payers to Grease Palms Stuff Pockets, and Pay for Undue Influence From Teapot Dome to Halliburton. Beverly, Mass.: Fair Winds Press. ISBN 9781592334513.
- Detweiler, Susan G. (1975). American Presidential China. Washington, D.C.: Smithsonian Institution.
- Detweiler, Susan G. (2008). American Presidential China: The Robert L. McNeil, Jr., Collection at the Philadelphia Museum of Art. New Haven, Conn.: Philadelphia Museum of Art and Yale University Press. ISBN 9780876331927.
- Dewhirst, Robert E. (2004). "Renovating the White House: A Brief History". In Watson, Robert P. (ed.). Life in the White House: A Social History of the First Family and the President's House. Albany, N.Y.: State University of New York Press. ISBN 0791460975.
- Donald, David Herbert (1995). Lincoln. New York: Simon and Schuster. ISBN 0684808463.
- Ellison, Betty Boles (2014). The True Mary Todd Lincoln: A Biography. Jefferson, N.C.: McFarland & Company. ISBN 9780786478361.
- Emerson, Jason (2012). Giant in the Shadows: The Life of Robert T. Lincoln. Carbondale, Ill.: Southern Illinois University Press. ISBN 9780809330553.
- Epstein, Daniel Mark (2009). The Lincolns: Portrait of a Marriage. New York: Ballantine Books. ISBN 9780345478009.
- Freylinghausen, Alice Cooney (2000). "Empire City Entrepreneurs: Ceramics and Glass in New York City". In Voorsanger, Catherine Hoover; Howat, John K. (eds.). Art and the Empire City: New York, 1825-1861. New York: Metropolitan Museum of Art. ISBN 0870999575.
- Gardner, Paul Vickers; Hoffman, Joan P. (1979). Glass. New York: Cooper-Hewitt Museum.
- Garrett, Wendell D. (1995). Our Changing White House. Boston: Northeastern University Press. ISBN 1555532225.
- Johnson, Lady Bird (2007). A White House Diary. Austin, Tex.: University of Texas Press. ISBN 9780292717497.
- King, C.J. (2005). Four Marys and a Jessie: The Story of the Lincoln Women. Manchester, Vt.: Friends of Hildene. ISBN 0975491733.
- Klamkin, Marian (1972). White House China. New York: Scribner. ISBN 068412758X.
- Klapthor, Margaret Brown (1982). The First Ladies Cook Book: Favorite Recipes of All the Presidents of the United States. New York: Parents Magazine Enterprises. ISBN 0939456036.
- Klapthor, Margaret Brown; Monkman, Betty C.; Allman, William G.; Detweiler, Susan Gray (1999). Official White House China: 1789 to the Present. New York: Barra Foundation. ISBN 0810939932.
- Kostyal, K.M. (2009). Abraham Lincoln's Extraordinary Era: The Man and His Times. Washington, D.C.: National Geographic. ISBN 9781426203282.
- Monkman, Betty C. (2000). The White House: Its Historic Furnishings and First Families. Washington, D.C.: White House Historical Association. ISBN 0789206242.
- Nevius, James; Nevius, Michelle (2014). Footprints in New York: Tracing the Lives of Four Centuries of New Yorkers. Guilford, Conn.: Lyons Press. ISBN 9780762796366.
- Packard, Jerrold M. (2013). The Lincolns in the White House: Four Years That Shattered a Family. New York: St. Martin's Press. ISBN 978-0312313029.
- Phillips-Schrock, Patrick (2013). The White House: An Illustrated Architectural History. Jefferson, N.C.: McFarland & Company. ISBN 9780786471522.
- Pratt, Harry E.; East, Ernest E. (February 1945). "Mrs. Lincoln Refurbishes the White House". Lincoln Herald: 13–22.
- Ramsey, Natalie Allen (1965). The Decorator Digest: Chapters in the History of Early American Decoration and Its European Background. Rutland, Vt.: C.E. Tuttle Co.
- Singleton, Esther (1907). The Story of the White House. New York: The McClure Company. p. 252. "East Room Van Buren."
- Spillman, Jane Shadel (1989). White House Glassware: Two Centuries of Presidential Entertaining. Washington, D.C.: White House Historical Association. ISBN 0912308362.
- Spillman, Jane Shadel (1998). "Service of Table Glass With Weld Family Arms". In Groft, Tammis Kane; Mackay, Mary Alice (eds.). Albany Institute of History & Art: 200 Years of Collecting. New York: Hudson Hills Press. ISBN 1555951007.
- Temple, Wayne C. (Spring 1959). "Mary Todd Lincoln's Travels". Journal of the Illinois State Historical Society: 180–194.
- Temple, Wayne C. (2012). ""I Am So Fond of Sightseeing: Mary Lincoln's Travels Up to 1865". In Williams, Frank J.; Burkhimer, Michael (eds.). The Mary Lincoln Enigma: Historians on America's Most Controversial First Lady. Carbondale, Ill.: Southern Illinois University Press. ISBN 9780809331246.
- Temple, Dottie; Finegold, Stan (2002). Flowers, White House Style. New York: Simon and Schuster. ISBN 9780743223348.
- Watson, Robert P. (2000). The Presidents' Wives: Reassessing the Office of First Lady. Boulder, Colo.: L. Rienner. ISBN 1555878601.
- Whitcomb, John; Whitcomb, Claire (2000). Real Life at the White House: Two Hundred Years of Daily Life at America's Most Famous Residence. New York: Routledge. ISBN 0415923204.
- Winkle, Kenneth J. (2013). Lincoln's Citadel: The Civil War in Washington, D.C. New York: W. W. Norton & Company. ISBN 9780393081558.
- Yokota, Kariann Akemi (2011). Unbecoming British: How Revolutionary America Became a Postcolonial Nation. New York: Oxford University Press. ISBN 9780195393422.
