= Théodore Deck =

French art potter (1823–1891)

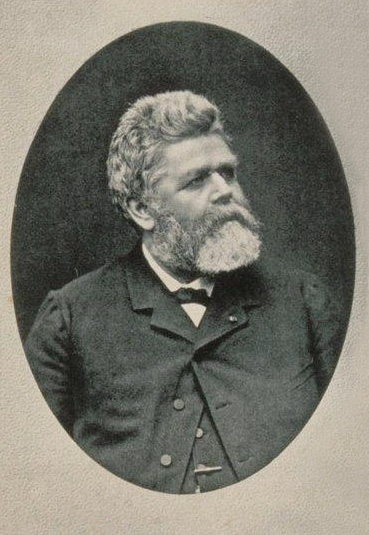
Joseph-Théodore Deck (1891)

Joseph-Théodore Deck (2 January 1823 – 15 May 1891) was a 19th-century French potter, an important figure in late 19th-century art pottery. Born in Guebwiller, Haut-Rhin, he began learning the trade in his early 20s, moving to Paris at age 24. In 1856 he established his own faience (earthenware) workshop, Joseph-Théodore Deck Ceramique Française, and began to experiment with styles from Islamic pottery, and in particular the Iznik style.

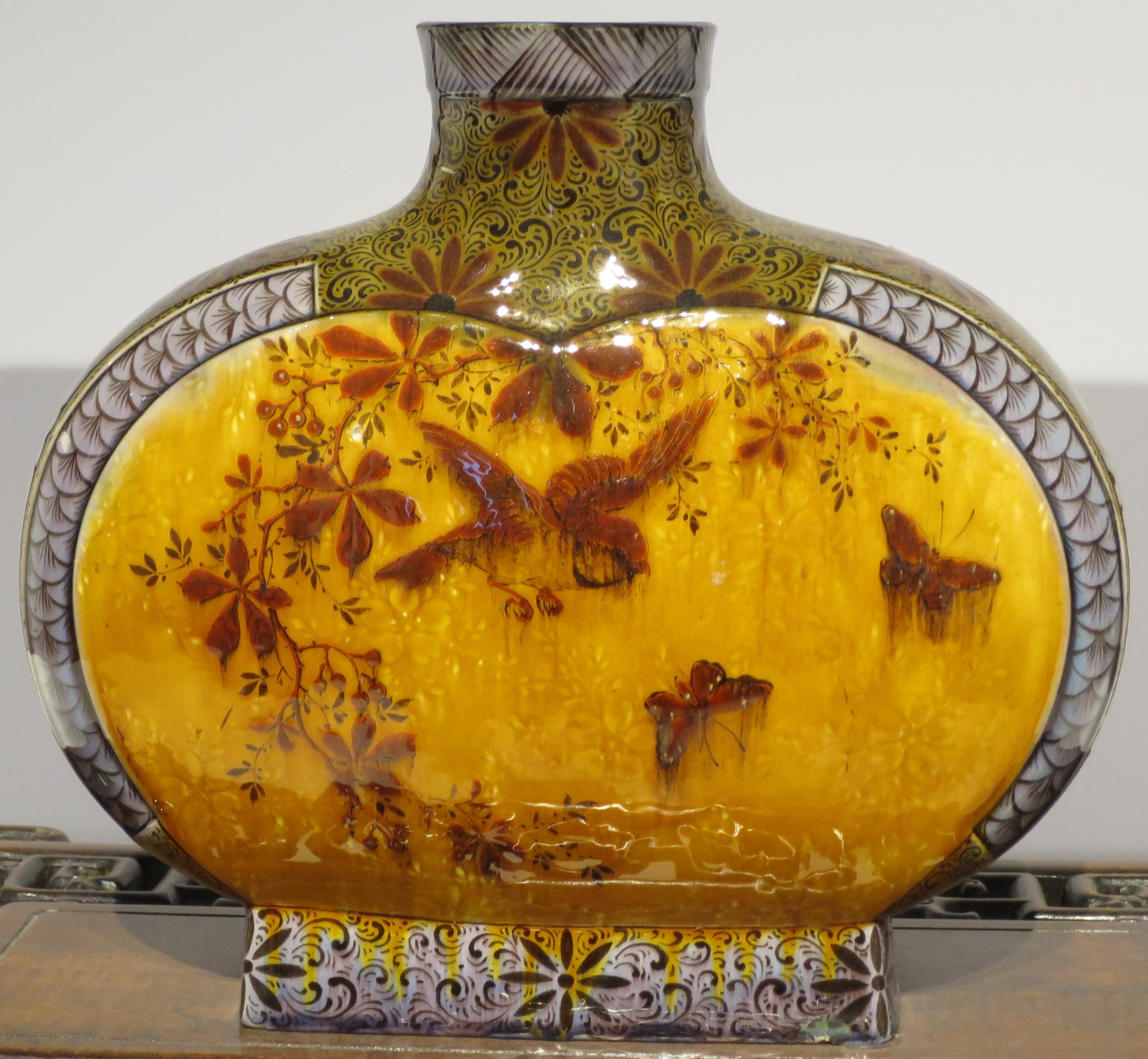
Faience vase, c. 1889

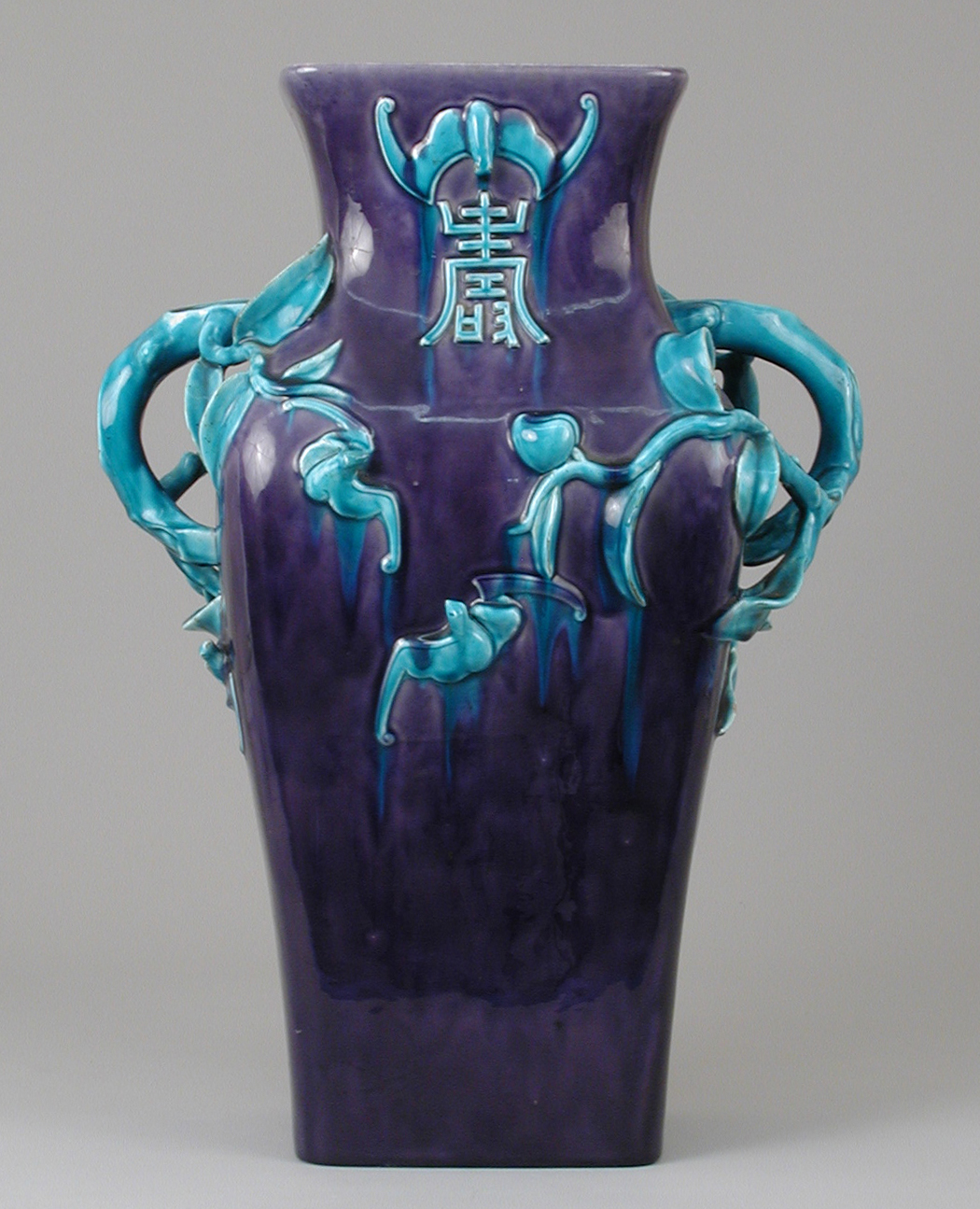
Vase, c. 1890

When Japonisme arrived in the 1870s he embraced this and other art pottery trends with enthusiasm, finally conquering the French establishment when he was made art director of Sèvres porcelain in 1887. Several important figures from the next generation were trained by Deck, including Edmond Lachenal.

In the 1880s he also worked in the Chinese pottery tradition, also collaborating with Raphaël Collin, and other artists of the time. He died in Paris. In 1887 he published a treatise under the title La Faïence, which is available in facsimile online.

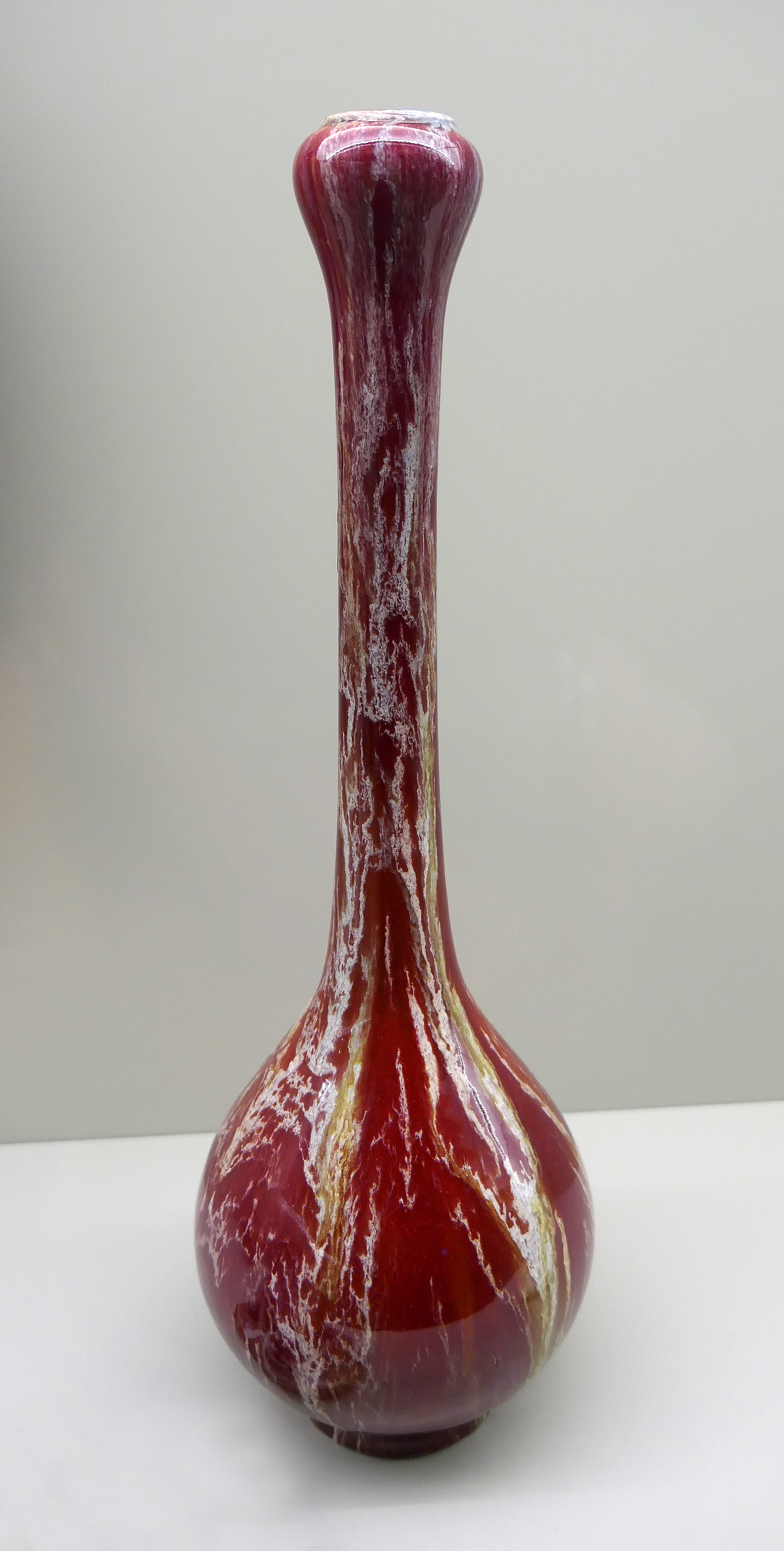
Porcelain garlic head vase with sang de boeuf glaze, Paris, 1895

== Gallery ==
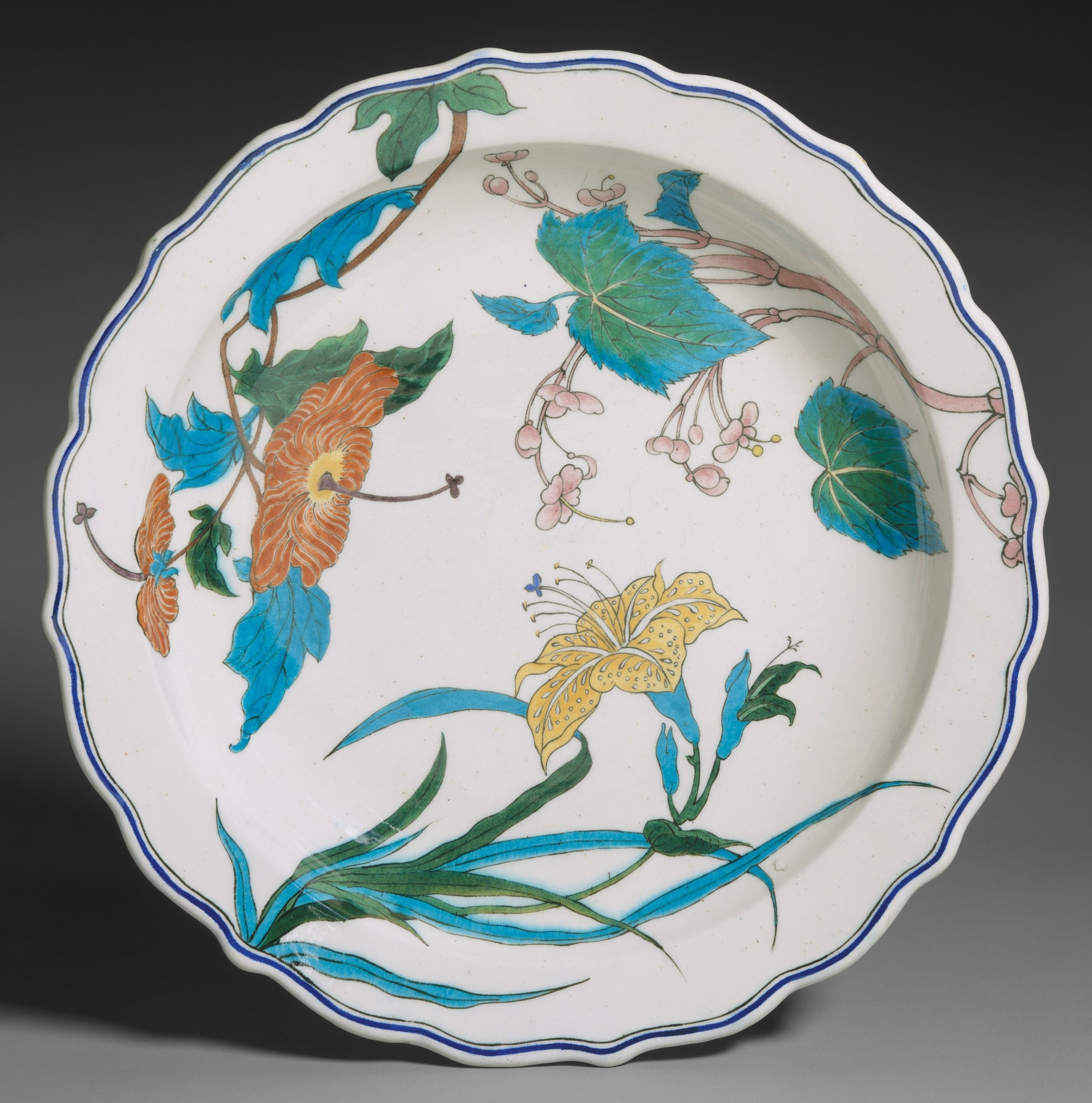
Dish, 1866

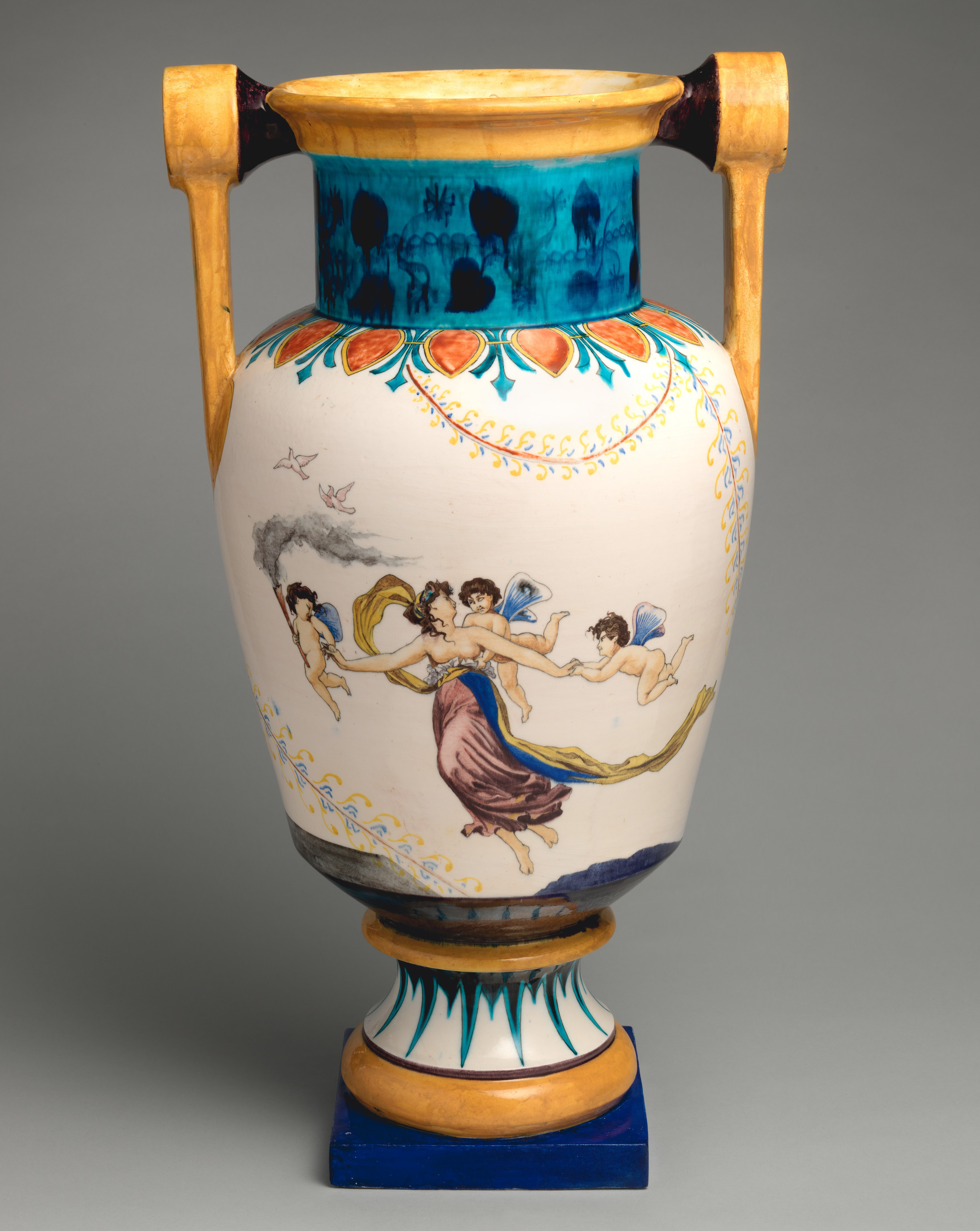
Vase with mythological scenes, 1869

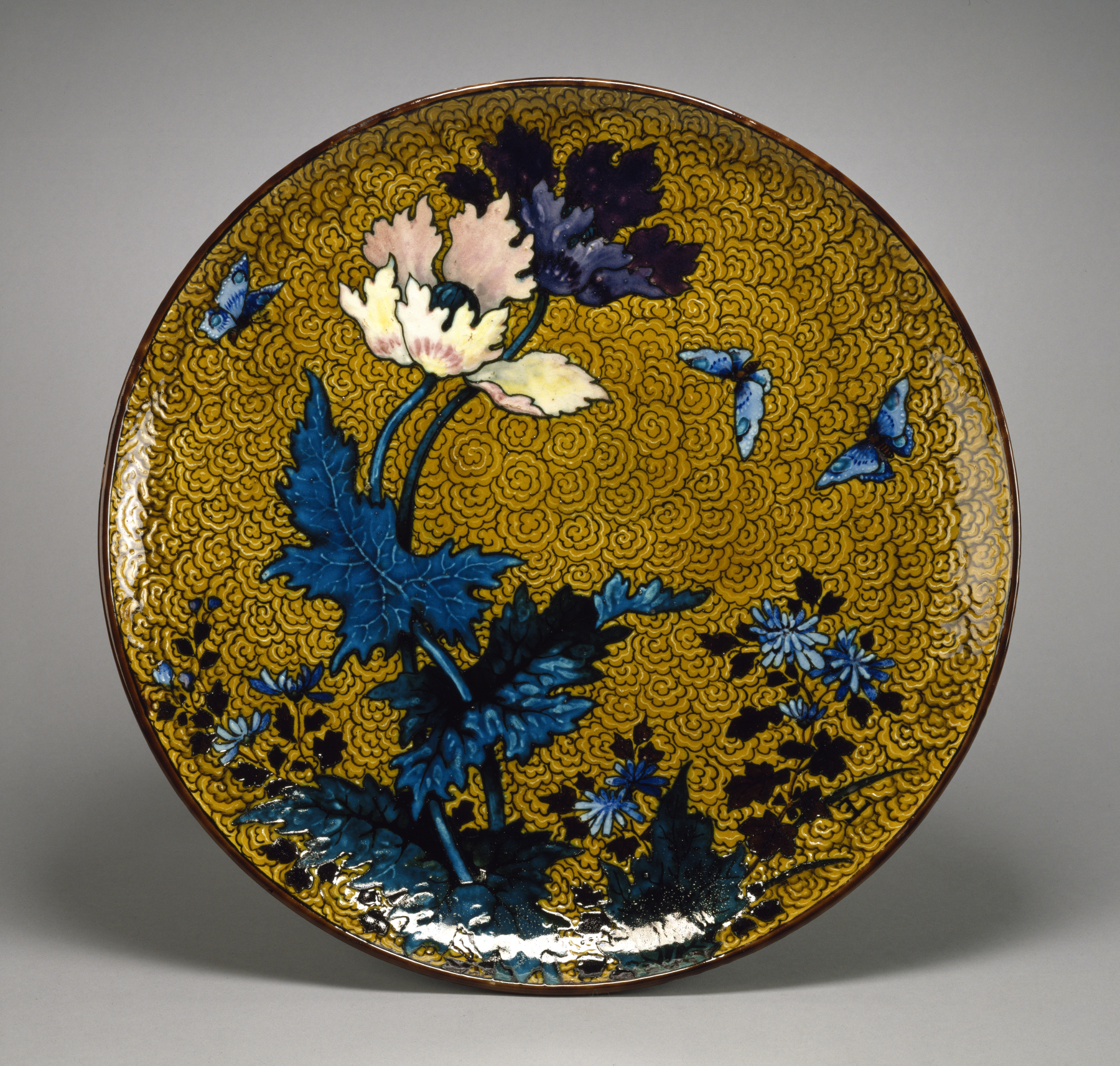
Japanese inspired plate, c. 1875, Walters Art Museum, Baltimore

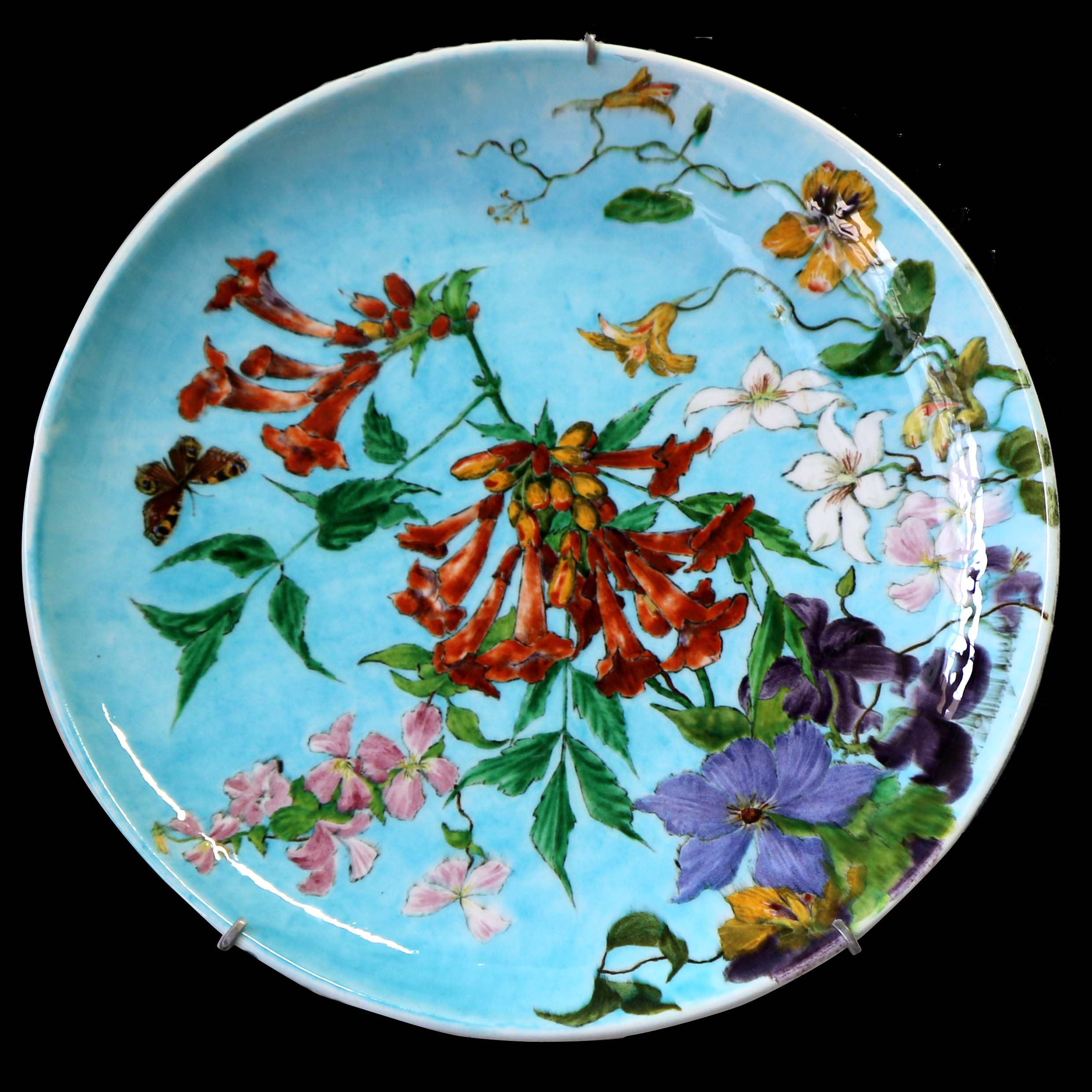
Floral plate

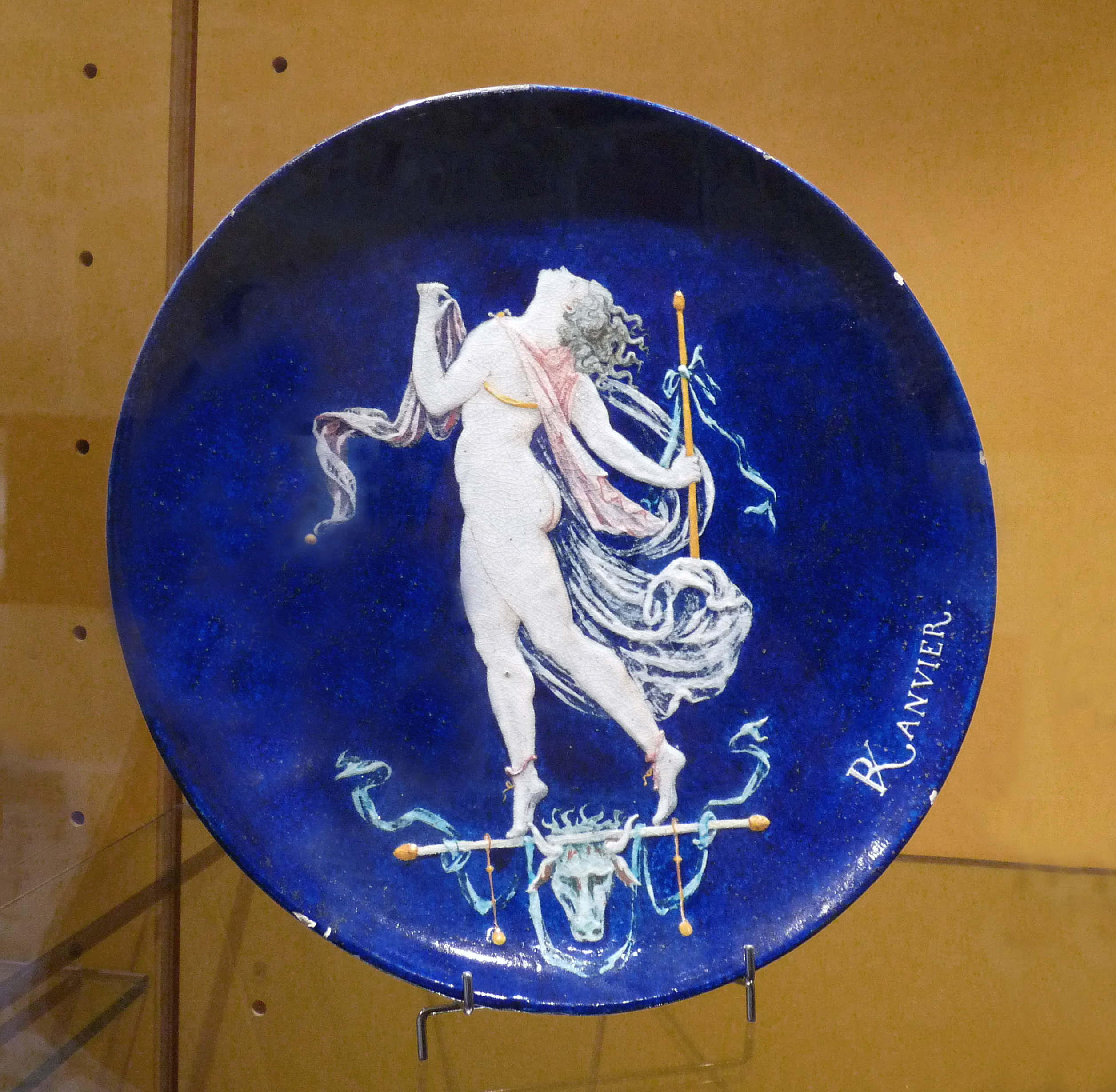
Plate, decorated by Joseph Victor Ranvier, 1870s, Musée Unterlinden, Colmar

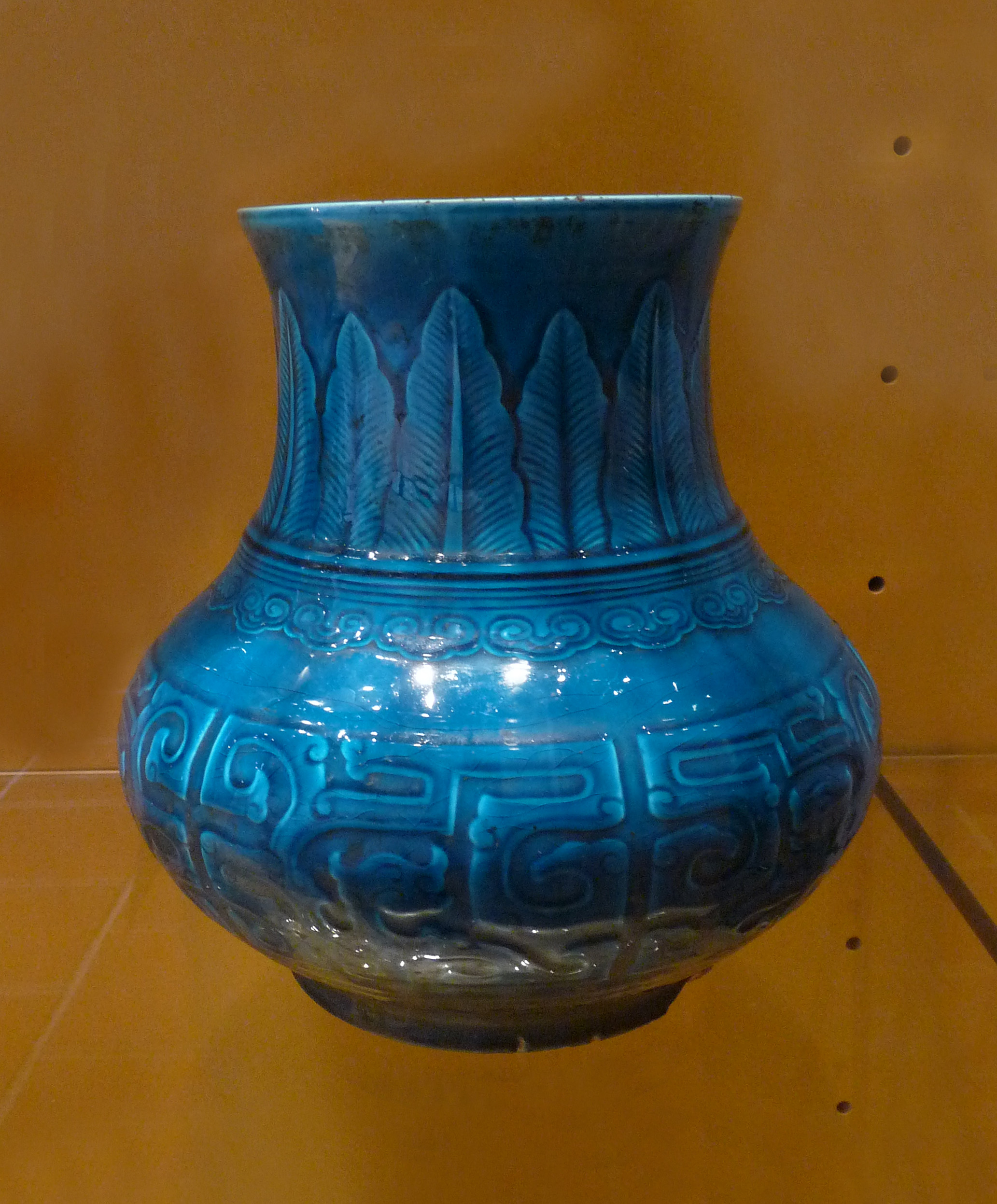
Faïence vase, ca. 1870s, Musée Unterlinden, Colmar

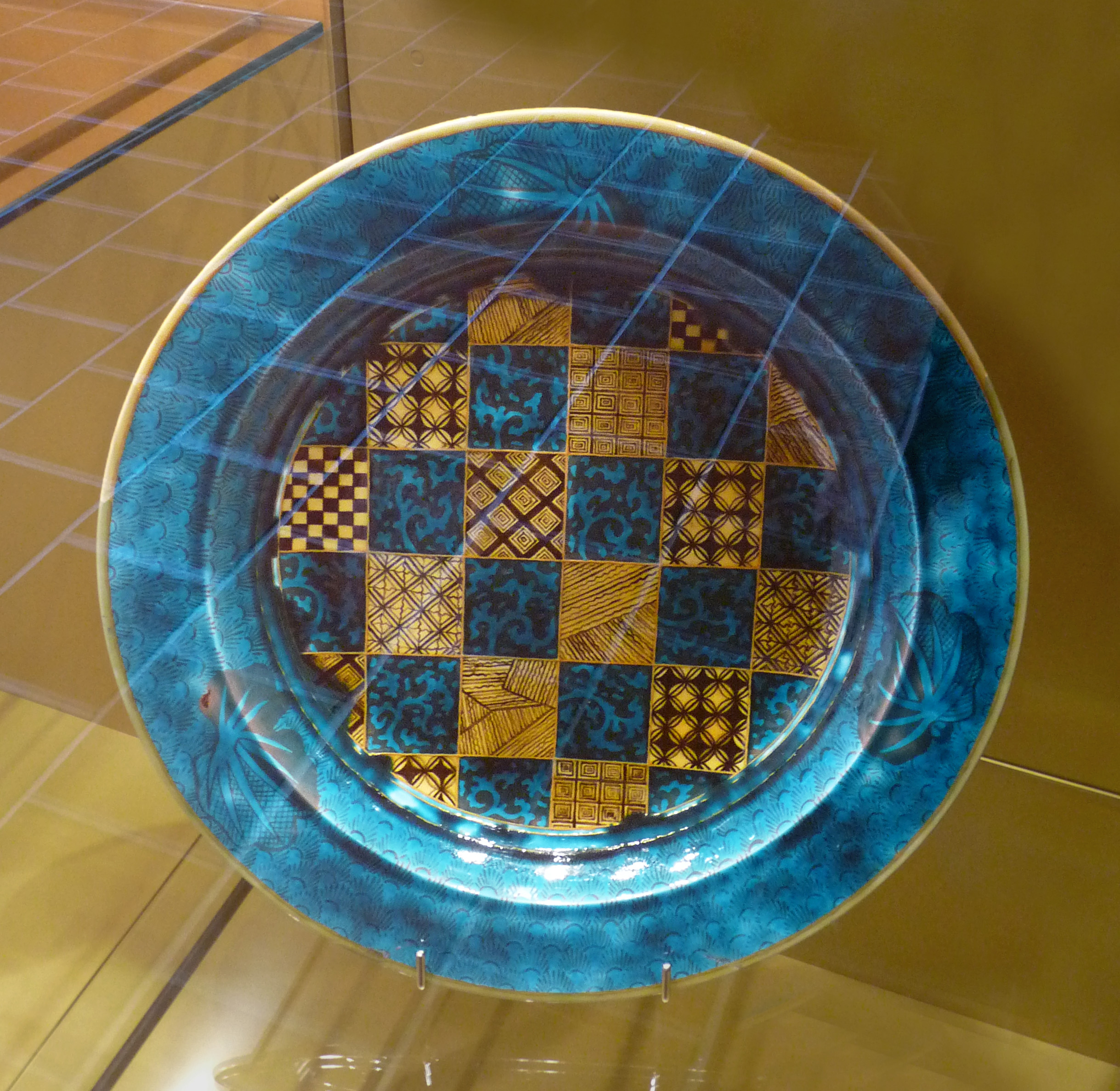
Japanese inspired plate, c. 1875, Musée Unterlinden, Colmar

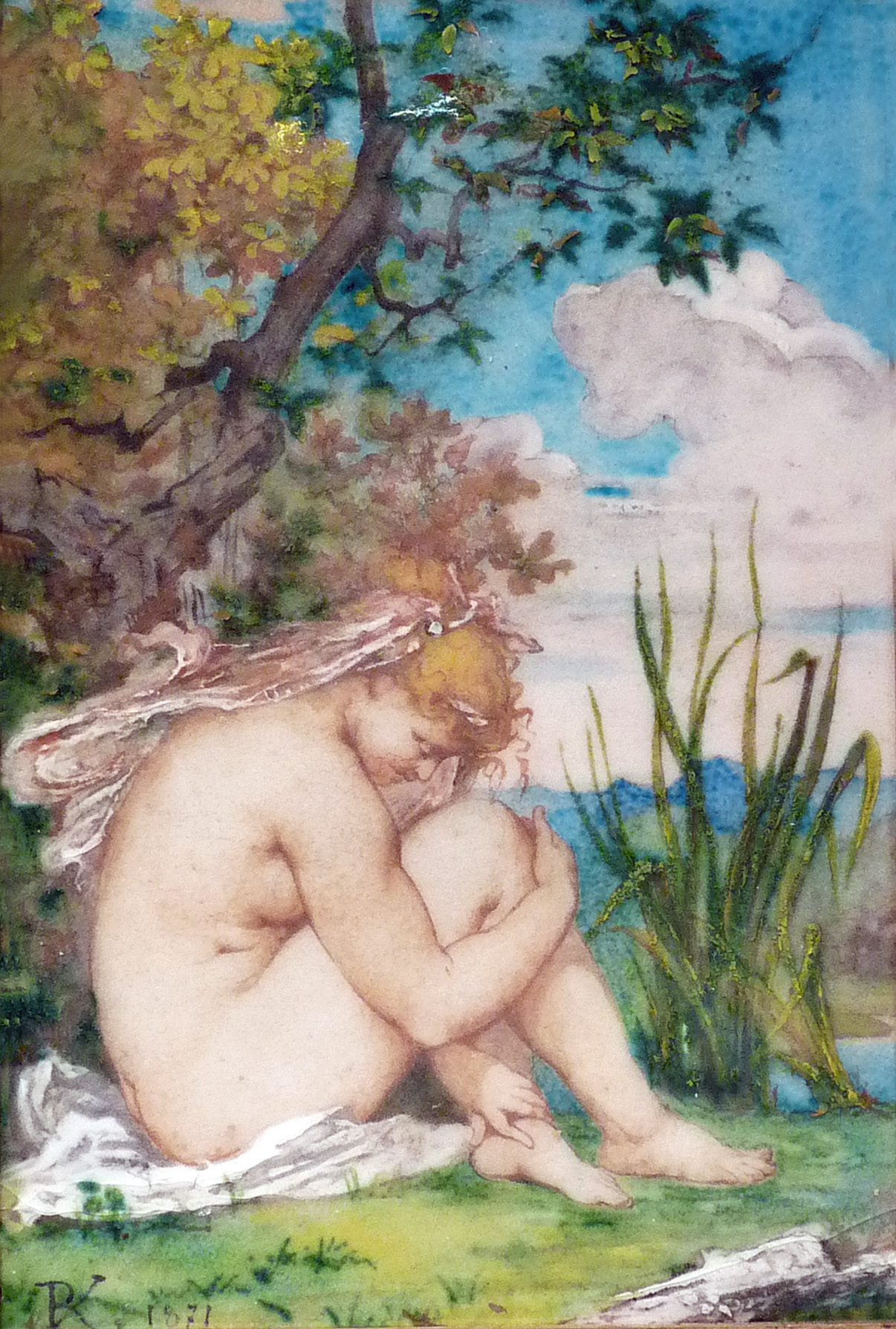
Tile, decorated by Joseph Victor Ranvier, 1870s, Musée Unterlinden, Colmar

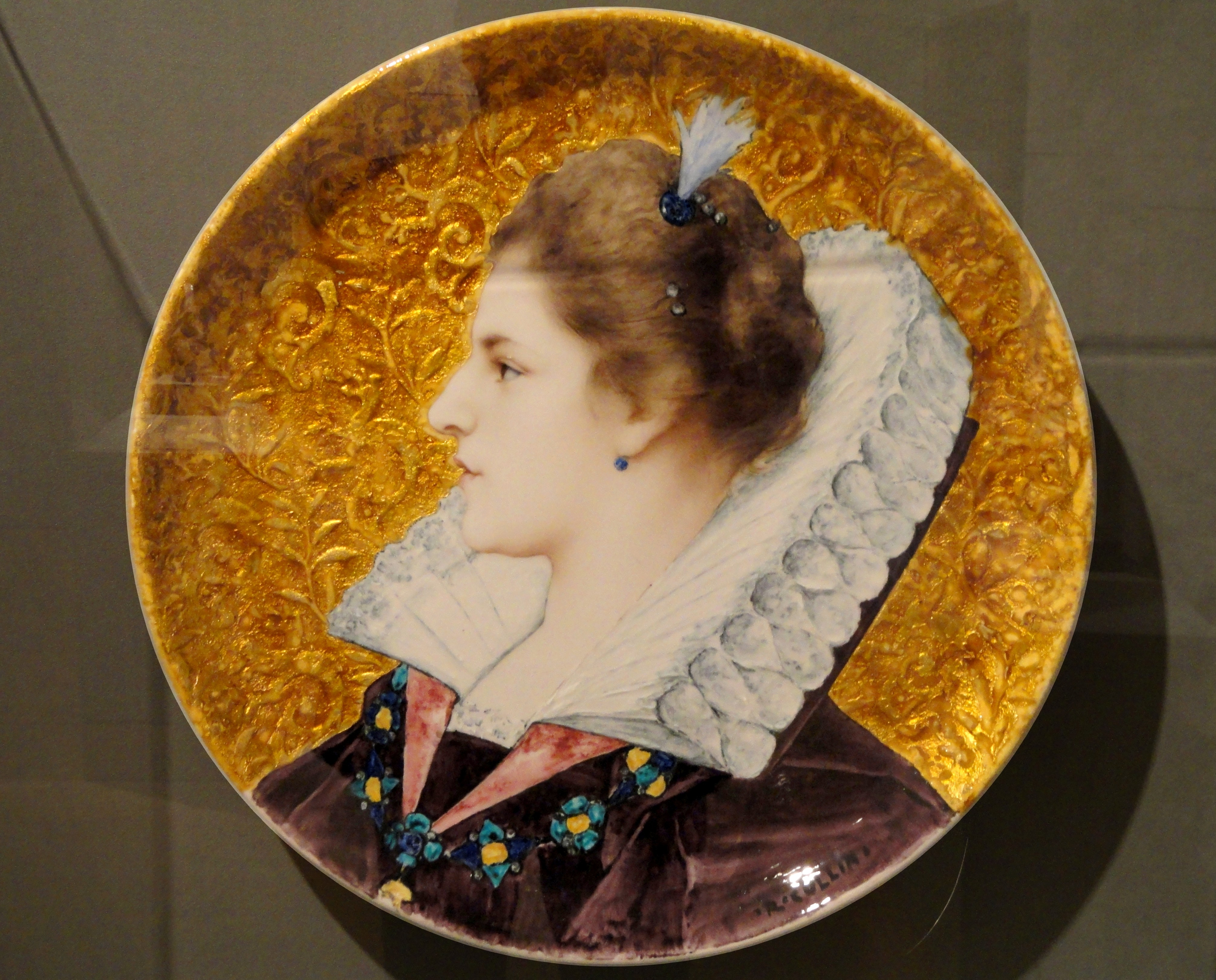
Plate, decorated by Raphaël Collin, Indianapolis Museum of Art

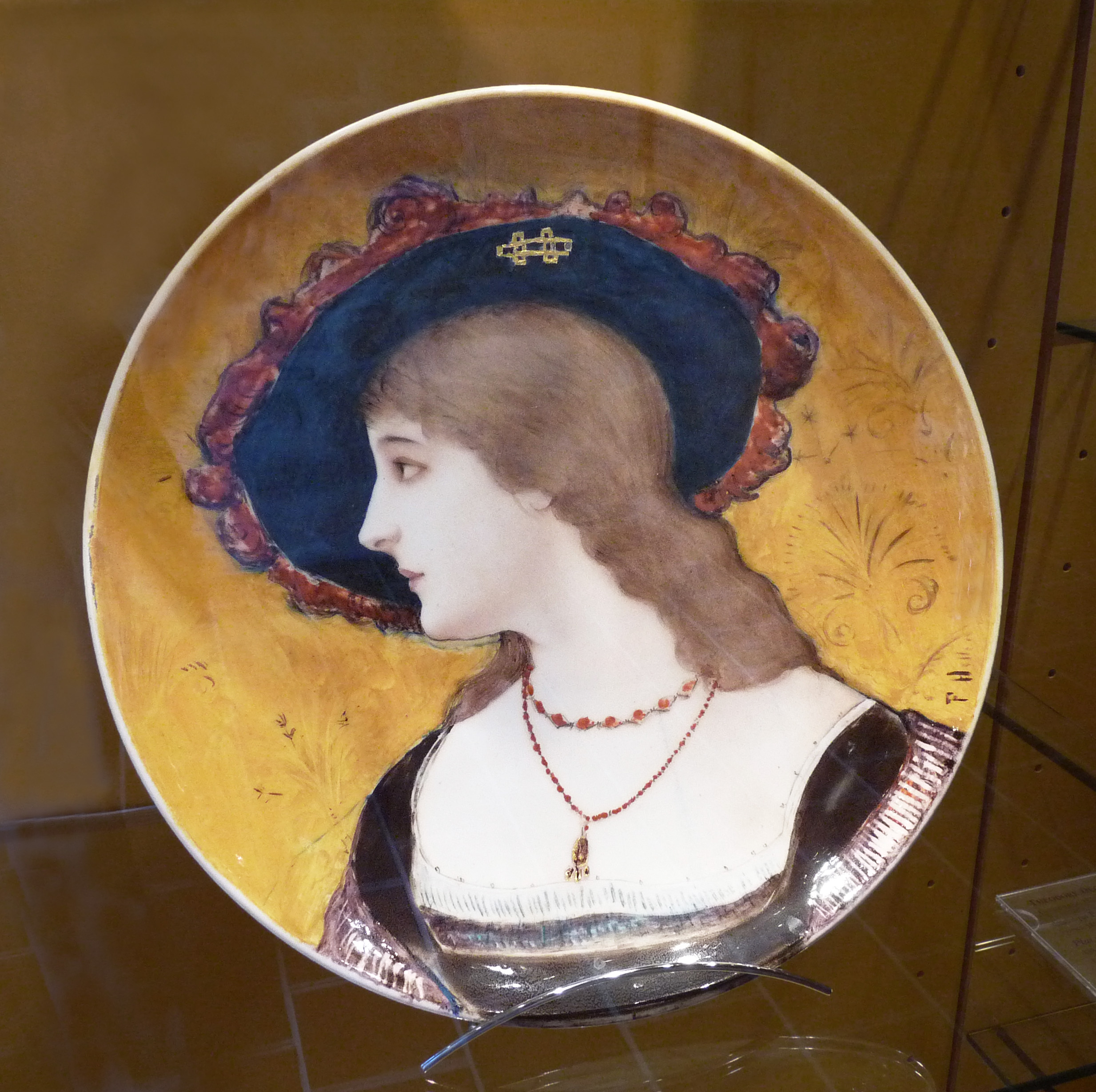
Plate, decorated by Paul Helleu, 1884, Musée Unterlinden, Colmar

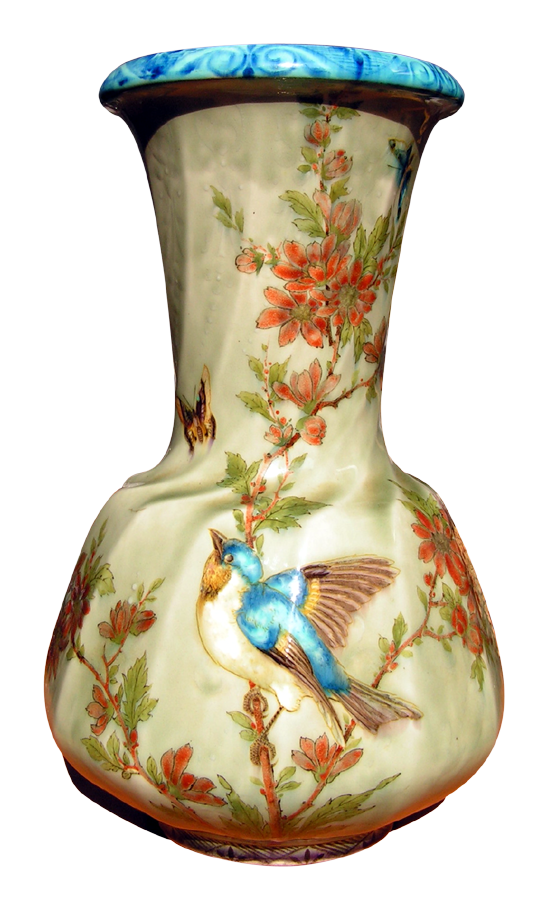
Vase, signed by Joseph-Théodore Deck

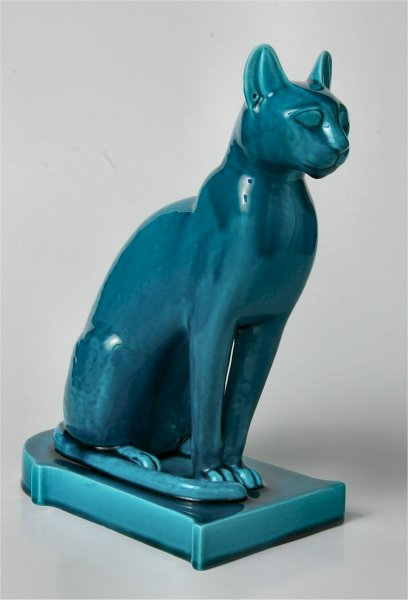
Egyptian-style faïence cat,
Musée Théodore Deck, Guebwiller

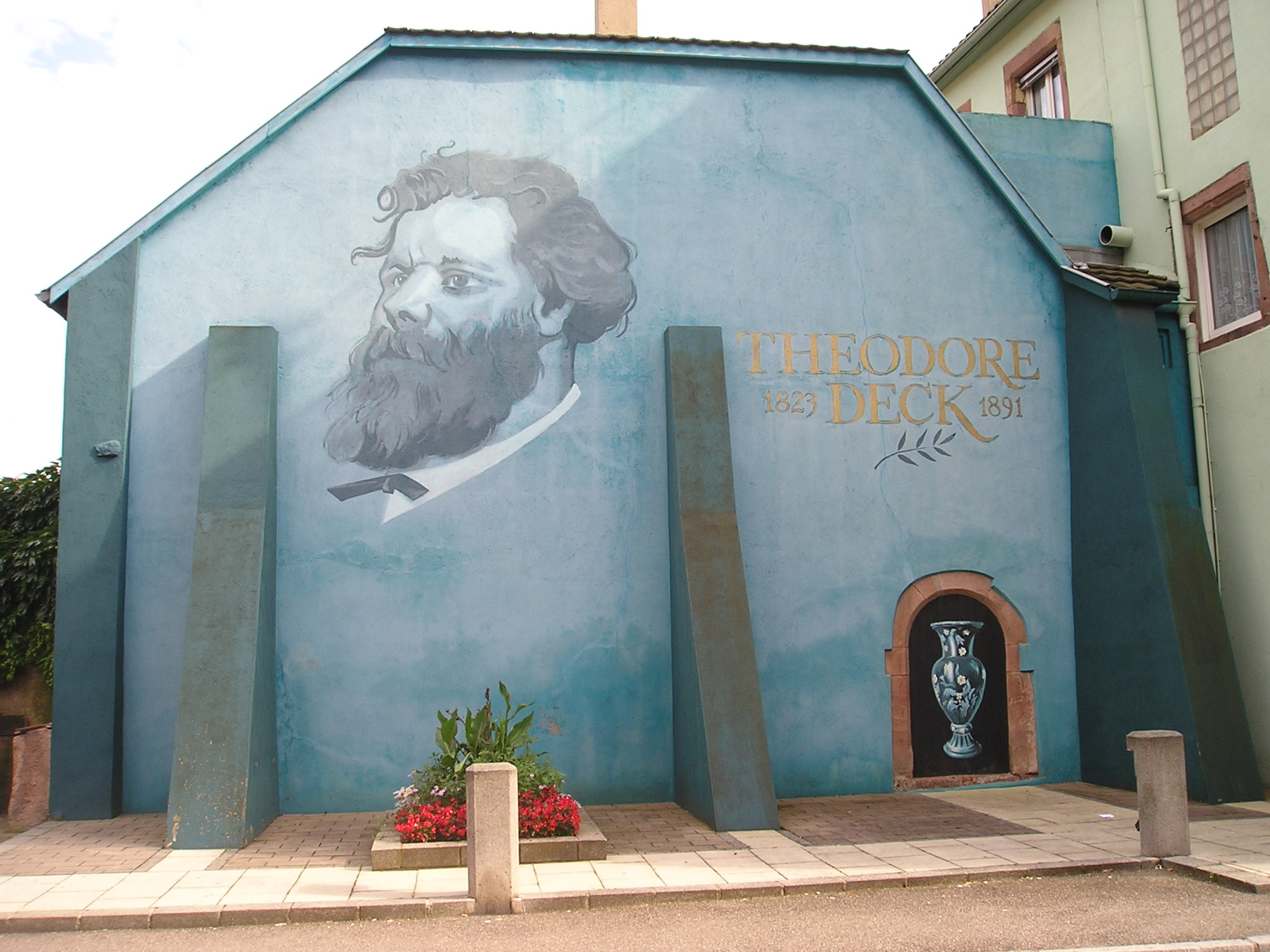
A home in Guebwiller decorated with Deck's portrait

== Sources ==
- Ceramics Today, Théodore Deck and the Islamic Style
- "Apollo: Deck's 'artistic faience' at the Musee Du Florival; Marthe and Rene Bloch-Angly have recently presented a munificent gift of ceramics by Theodore Deck to the Musee du Florival in Deck's native town, Guebwiller. It covers almost the full range of his output, and includes some notable rarities". Vol. 161, no. 520. Archived from the original on March 6, 2008 – via FindArticles.

== Bibliography ==
- Théodore Deck, La faïence, Quantin, Paris, 1887. 300 p., complete text online at Gallica
- À la Mémoire de Théodore Deck. Érection d'un Monument à Guebwiller (Alsace), sa ville natale, J. Dreyfus impr, Guebwiller?, 1911?
- Jules-Antoine Castagnary, « Théodore Deck », in Revue Alsacienne, 1880
- Antoinette Faÿ-Hallé, Françoise Fournière, Brigitte Grenier et al. (dir.), Théodore Deck ou L'éclat des émaux, 1823–1891 (exposition catalogue, Marseille, Centre de la Vieille Charité, 1994, organized by the Musée Grobet-Labadié), Musées de Marseille, Marseille, 1994, ISBN 2-9500996-7-X
- André Girodie, « Biographies alsaciennes : Théodore Deck », in Revue Alsacienne illustrée, 1903, vol. V
- André Girodie, Un céramiste alsacien : Théodore Deck, Art & Industrie, Nancy, 1912
- J. Loebnitz, Article nécrologique sur M. Théodore Deck, in La Céramique et la verrerie, 1891?
- Sandor Kuthy, Albert Anker, faiences, en collaboration avec Théodore Deck, Marguerat, Lausanne, 1985
- Alexandre Meichler (intro.), Théodore Deck : magicien du feu (1823–1891) (exposition catalogue, Guebwiller, City Hall, 1976), Alsatia, Guebwiller, 1976
- Théodore Deck (catalogue de l'exposition au Musée Cantini, Marseille, 1980), Le Musée, Marseille, 1979?
- Théodore Deck : la véranda des glycines, Musée du florival, Guebwiller, 1989
- Théodore Deck : 1823–1891 (préface Charles Haby), Musée du Florival, Guebwiller, 1991, ISBN 2-908367-20-3
