= Raoul Lachenal =

French potter (1885–1956)

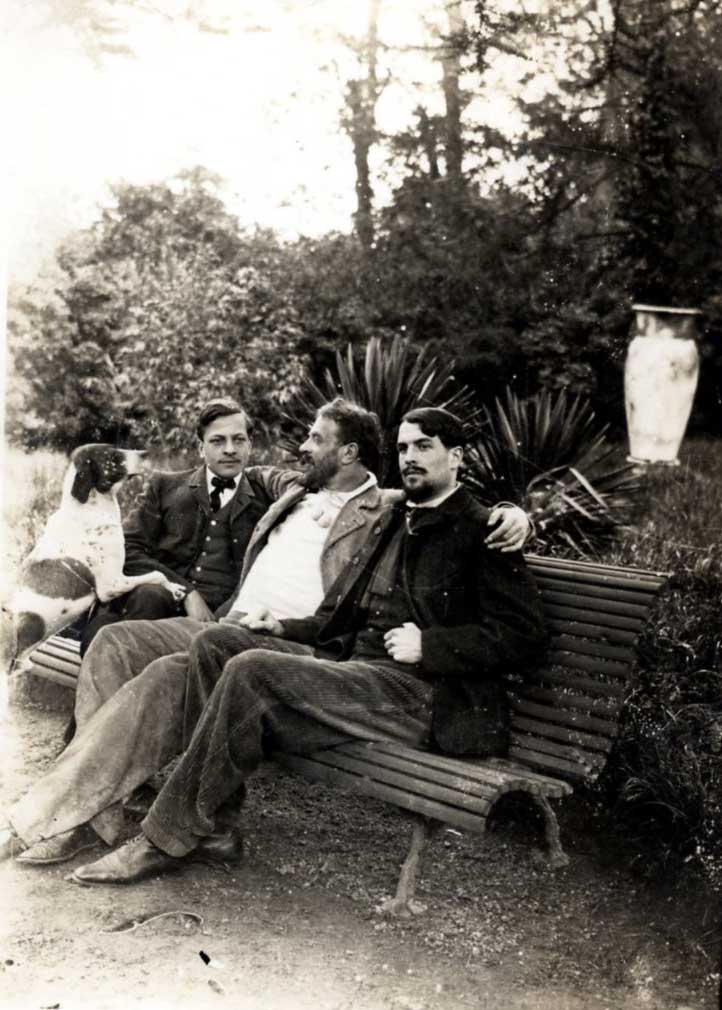
Edmond Lachenal (centre) and sons, Raoul (left) and Jean-Jacques

Raoul Lachenal (1885–1956) was a French potter.

The son of Edmond Lachenal, Raoul Lachenal worked in his father's studio until 1911, when he established a new workshop at Boulogne-sur-Seine. While some of Raoul Lachenal's Art Nouveau ceramics resemble pieces by his father, he also produced distinctive stoneware that can hold its own against works by master glaze artists like Ernest Chaplet and Albert Dammouse. At his best, Lachenal can rightly be compared to these titans of the French art pottery renaissance.

Lachenal first exhibited his Art Nouveau stoneware at Paris salons in 1904. Period photographs show pieces with organic body forms, looping handles, and incised decoration similar to Edmond Lachenal's work from around 1900. Given the fact that father and son shared an atelier, the question of authorship is murky on several levels, notably those of direct influence and possible collaboration. Nonetheless, the son's stoneware is distinguished by its sophisticated use of conventionalized motifs and layering of high-temperature glazes.

His whiplash handle vase is a masterpiece of body design and glaze effects, with the handles deftly composed around the piece's lip and shoulder breathing new vitality into an overused Art Nouveau leitmotif. What really brings this piece to life, though, is its thickly applied high-temperature glaze, whose palette of purple hues is as varied as the subtle shifts in depth across the body's surface.

Similarly, Lachenal's treatment of the peacock feather refreshes a motif that harks back to the English Aesthetic Movement of the 1870s. Thanks to unexpected juxtapositions of matte and glossy areas, the vertically arranged feathers border on abstraction and yield a complex figure and ground relationship between the motif and the surrounding space. Such optical complexity challenges the viewer's perception of familiar imagery.

Lachenal's trumpet neck vase wears a remarkable volcanic glaze whose pitted surface is astonishingly fresh, almost contemporary. Here the purposeful juxtaposition of an overall cratered surface and a matte glaze shoulder reveals keen sensitivity to textural effects.

These three vases refute traditional accounts of Raoul Lachenal's Art Nouveau ceramics as undifferentiated restatements of his father's style from the same period.
