= Edmond Lachenal =

French art potter (1855–1948)

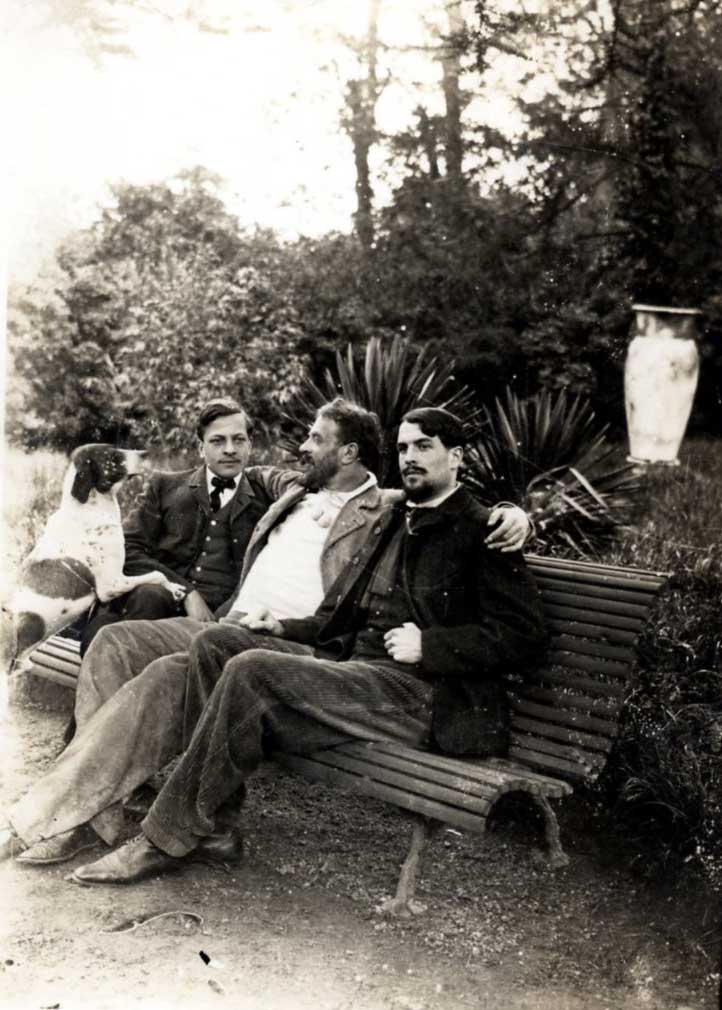
Edmond Lachenal (center) and sons, Raoul (left) and Jean-Jacques

Edmond Lachenal (3 June 1855 – 10 June 1948) was a French potter. He was a key figure in the French art pottery movement, and his works are held in many international public collections.

Edmond Lachenal had two sons, Jean-Jacques Lachenal and Raoul Lachenal who succeeded him as potters. Edmond Lachenal was one of the pivotal figures in the development and creation of Art Nouveau in ceramics, and his works are comparable in influence and importance to those of Ernest Chaplet, Pierre-Adrien Dalpayrat, and Albert Dammouse. His work is included in collections of Art Nouveau ceramics in the Louvre, Paris and The Metropolitan Museum of Art in New York.

== Training ==
He was trained in Theodore Deck's studio, starting when he was 15. At the 1873 World's Fair in Vienna, Lachenal's work as a decorator for Deck received an Honorable Mention. Following this award, he became director of Deck's decoration atelier, a significant promotion for one so young.

In 1889, Lachenal received his first gold medal at the World's Fair in Paris for his work with faience wares in the style of Theodore Deck. These works used bright, polychrome glazes, a feature of his work that would remain constant throughout his career.

== Art Nouveau ==
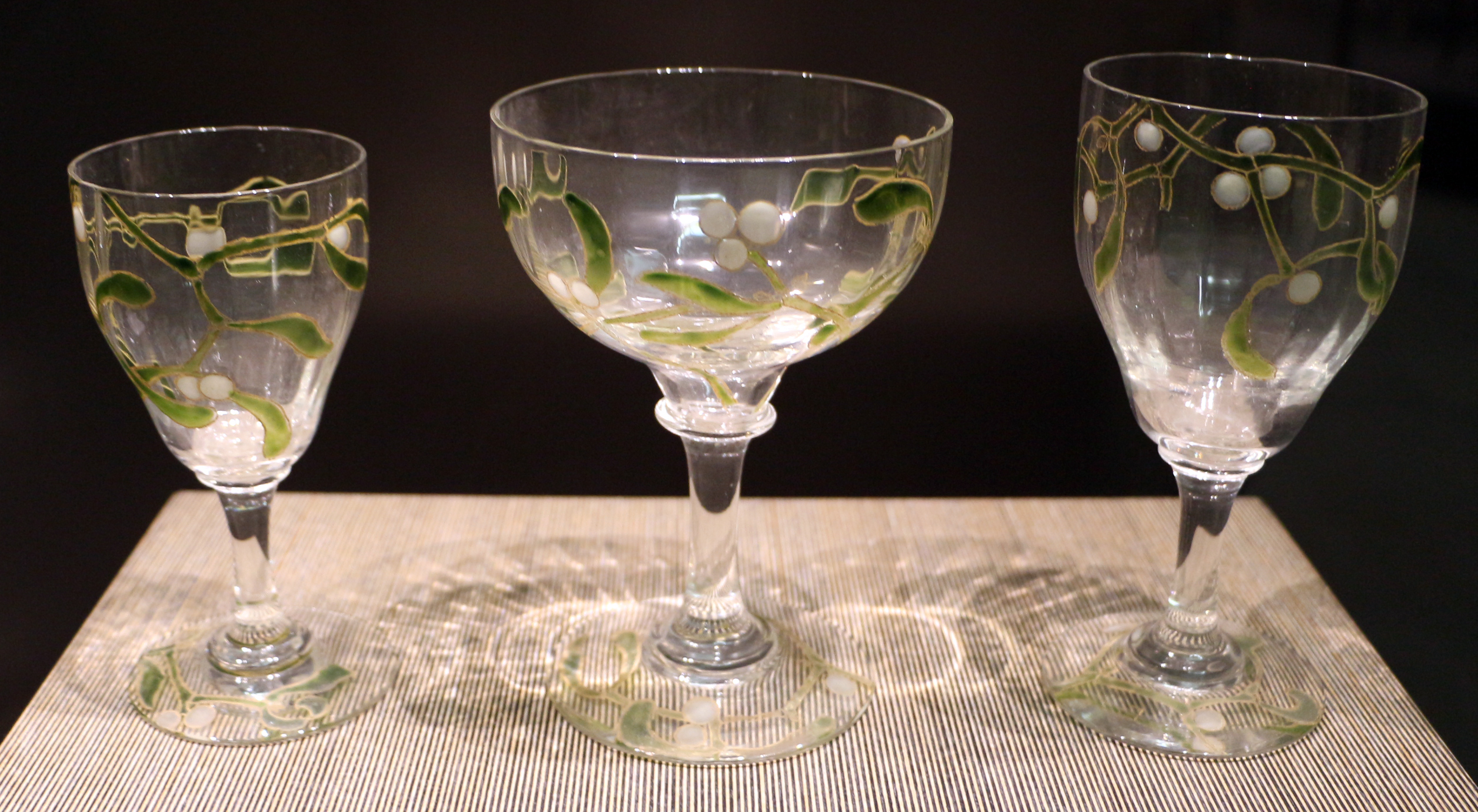
Glasses, Nancy, after 1901

His early work was an imitation of what he produced while working for Deck, but by the 1890s, Lachenal's work showed the influences of the trends and fashions of the late nineteenth century: Japanese prints, the shift from faience pottery to grès, and the emergence of Art Nouveau.

Unlike his peers, Lachenal did not produce matte glazed works, instead creating his matte effects with hydrofluoric acid, eating away the glossy surface to create a matte effect. This procedure was controversial at the time (Émile Gallé was one who disapproved), but allowed him to produce brightly colored work.

During this period, Emile Decoeur was his apprentice and worked in his studio.

== Collaborations with Sculptors ==
By 1894 Lachenal had begun casting sculptors' work in stoneware with mat glazes. The best known of his collaborations was with the Swedish-born sculptor, Agnès de Frumerie (1869–1937). She produced Symbolist figurative sculptures and decorations for the vases. Their collaboration continued until at least 1907. Lachenal also produced faience editions of vases by Hector Guimard in the same organic style as the Paris Metro entrances in 1902.

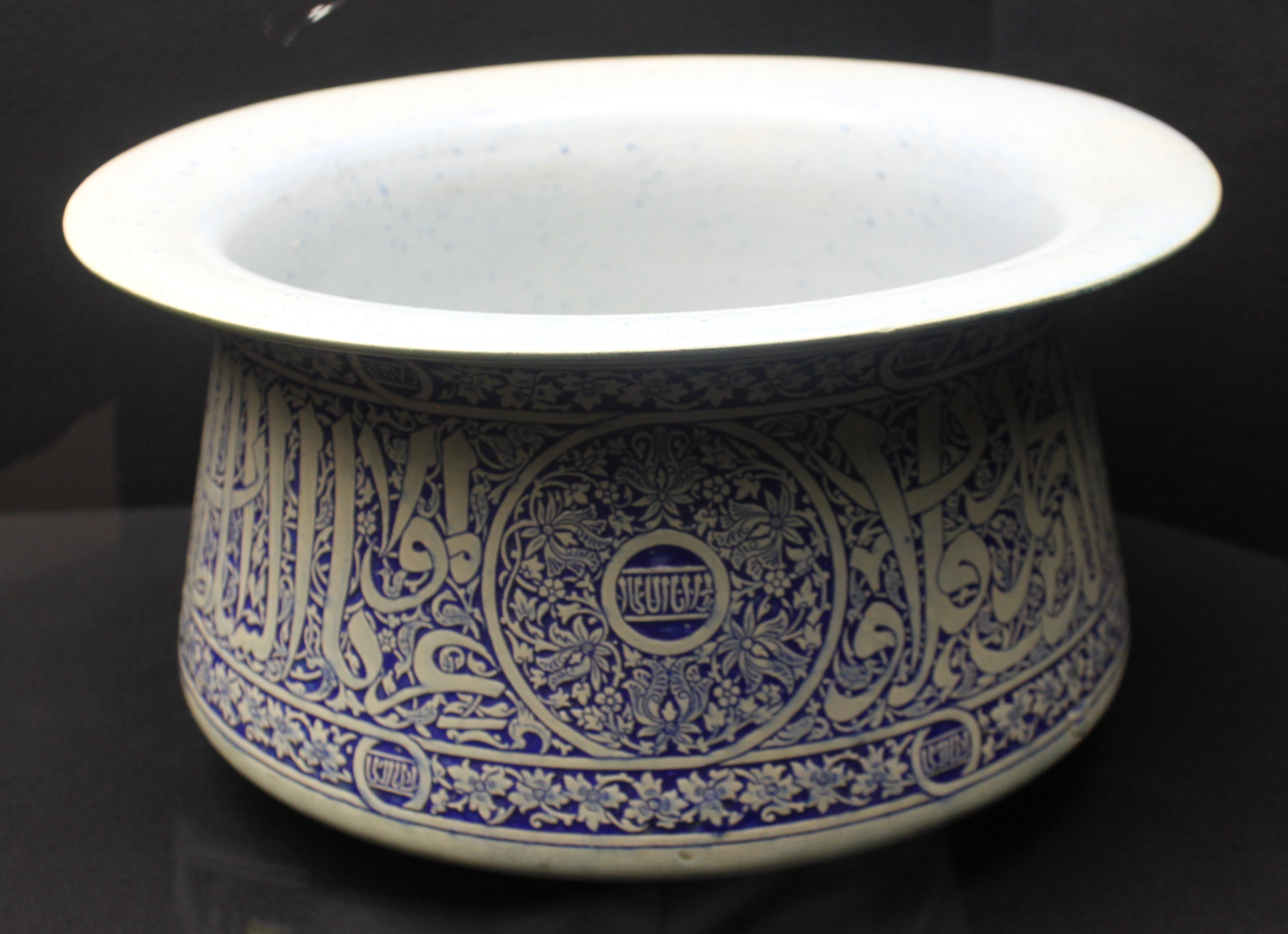
Islamic pottery style, Atelier Theodore Deck, c. 1863

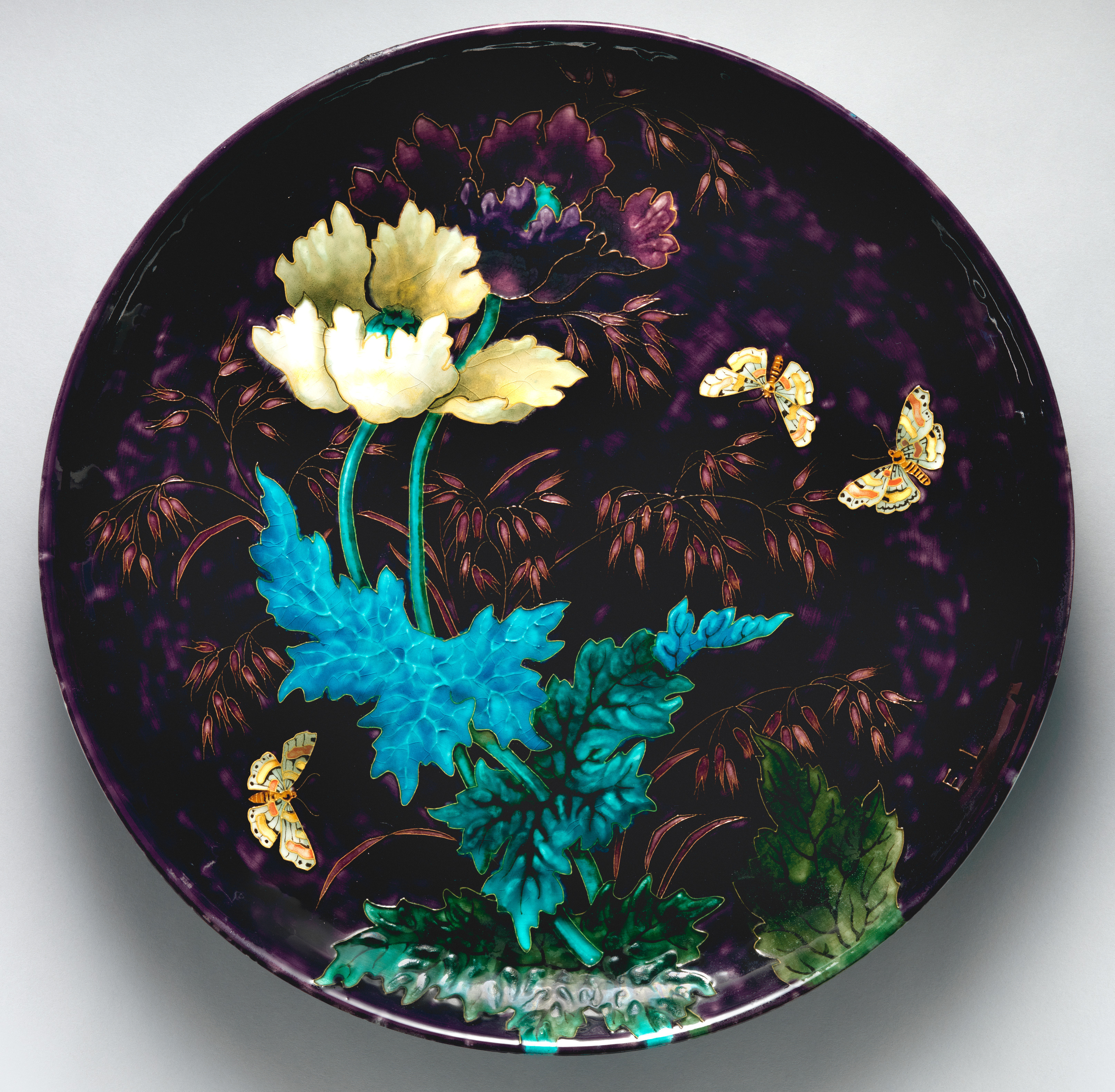
Charger with flowers and butterflies, earthenware, 1870s

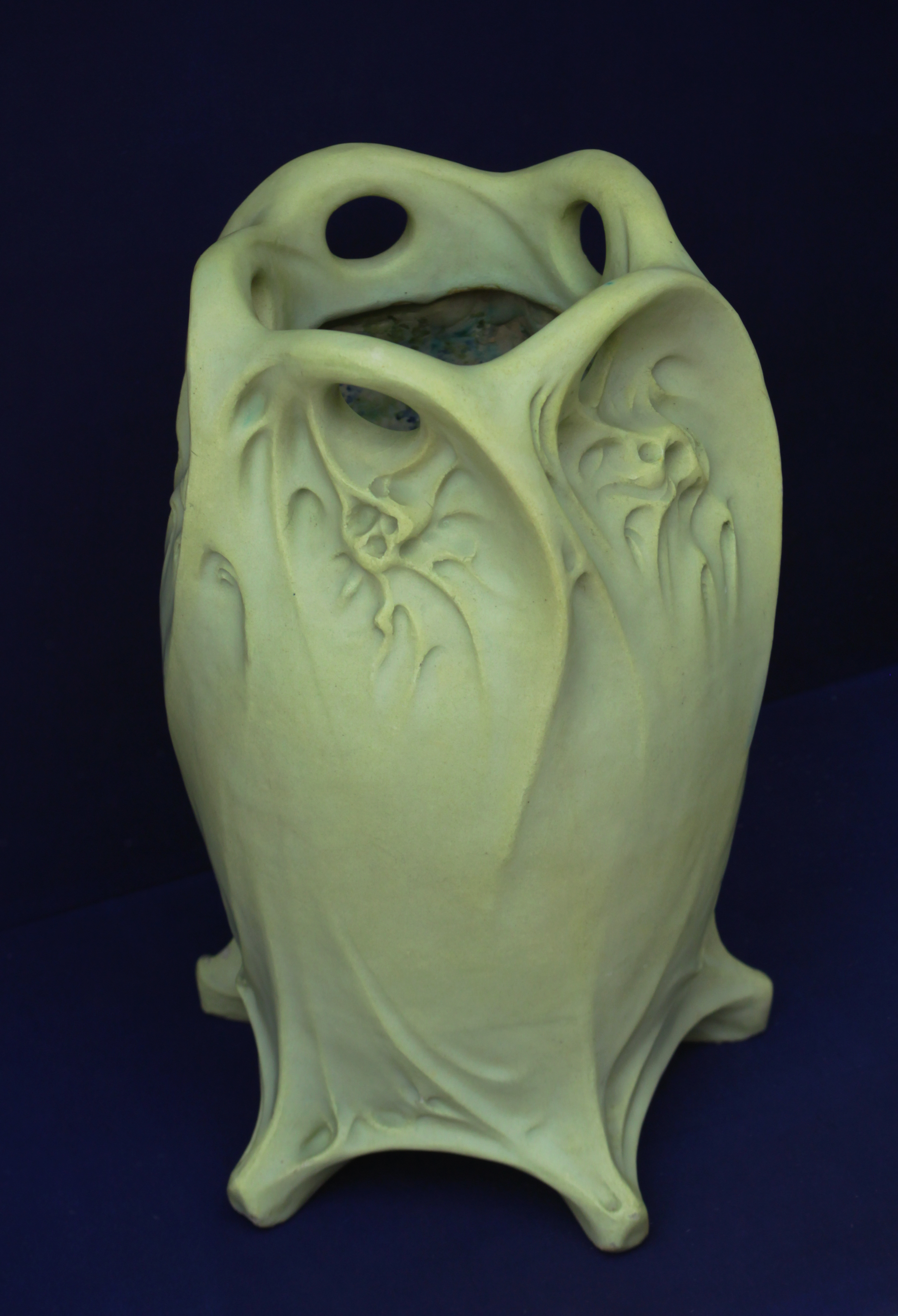
Vase designed by Hector Guimard and made by Lachenal, 1899

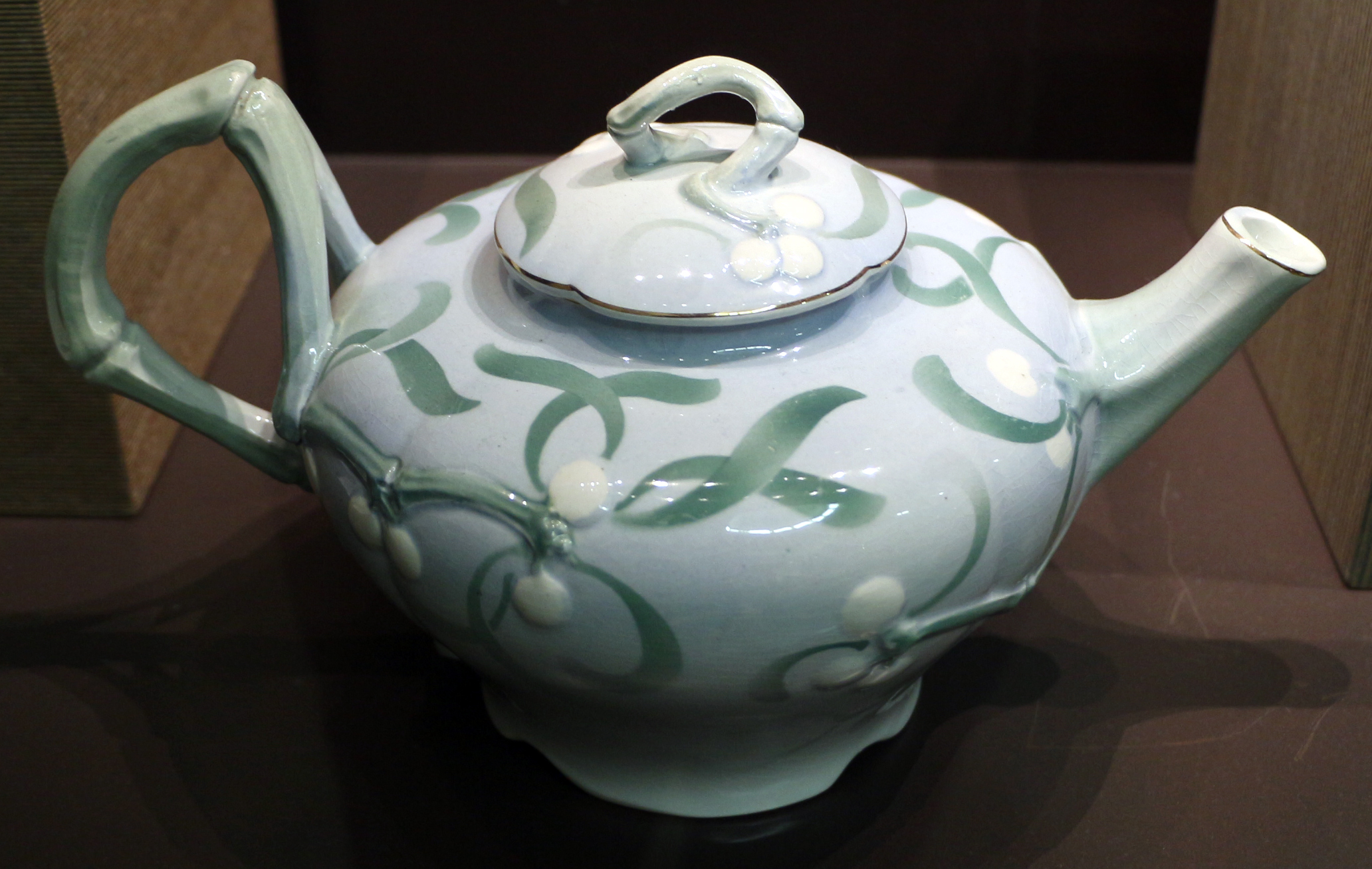
Teapot by Keller et Guérin, Lunéville, 1900s
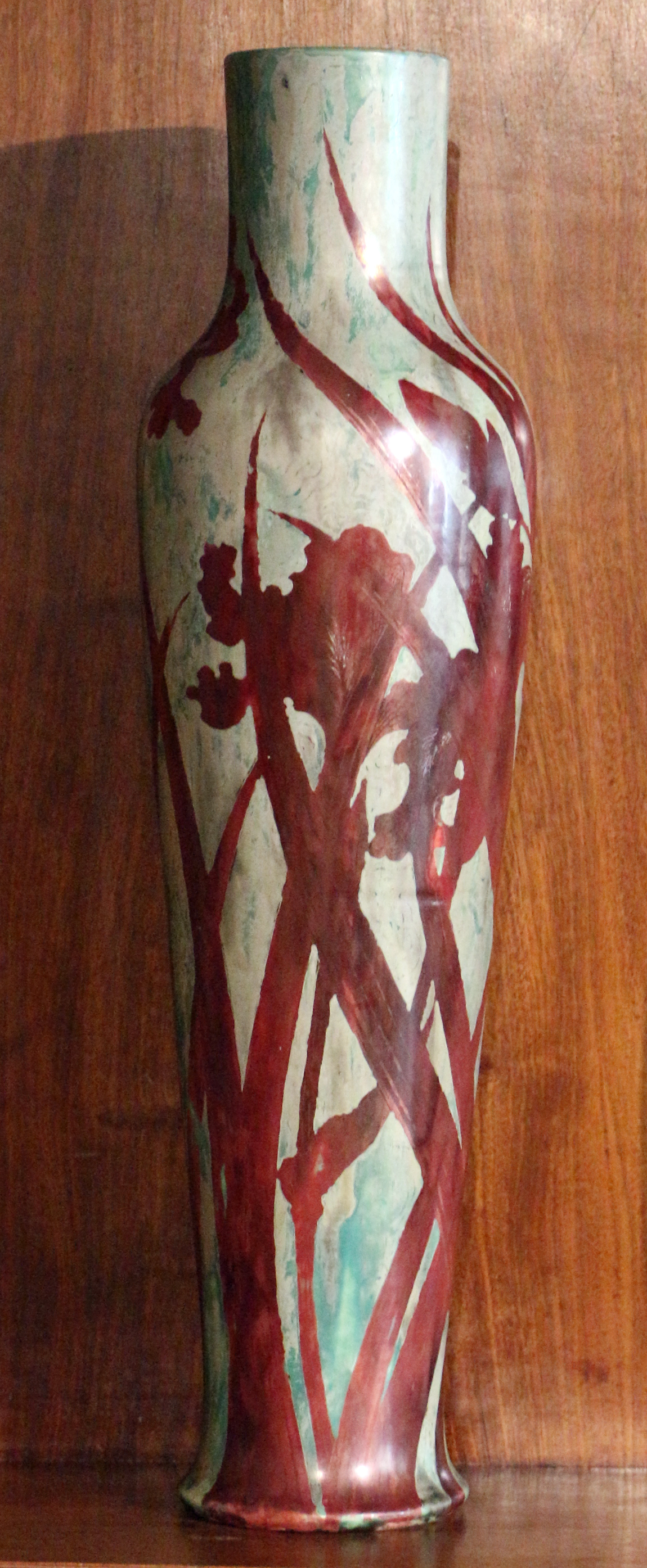
Vase by Keller et Guérin, Lunéville, c. 1895

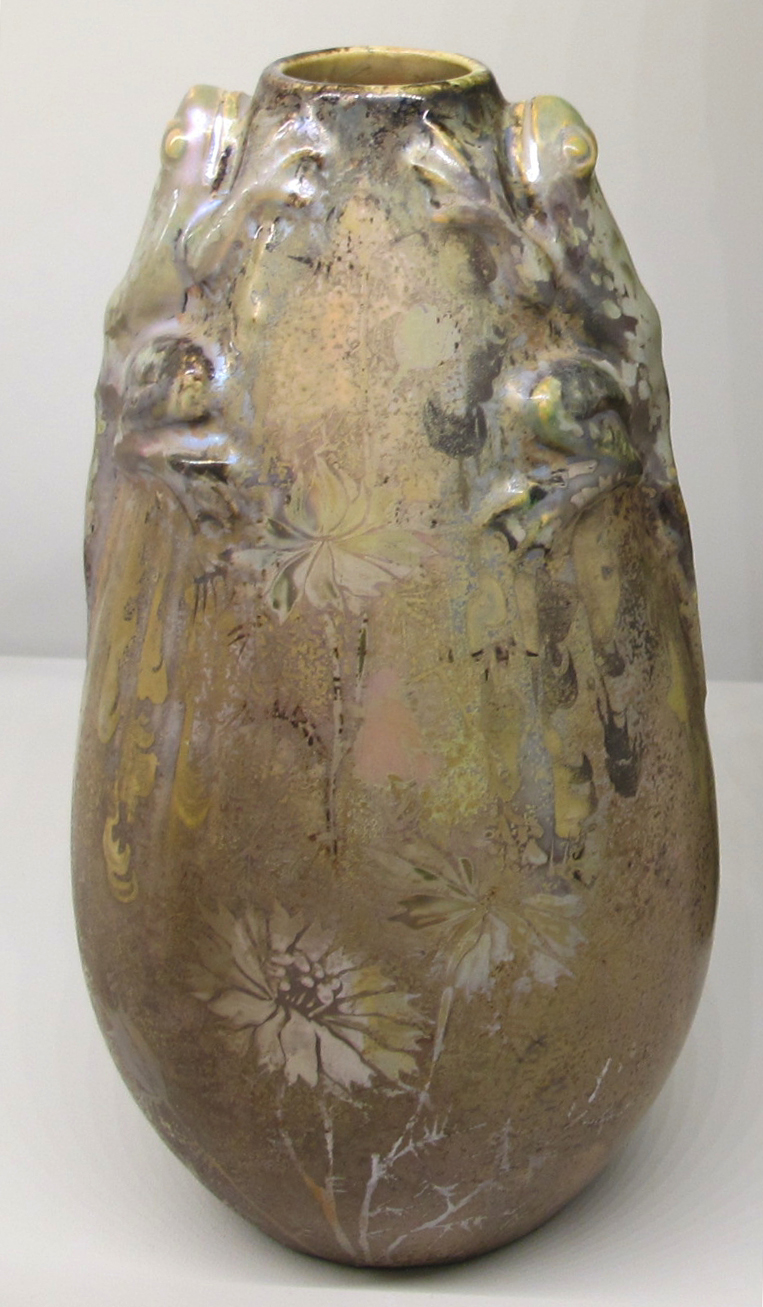
Vase by Keller et Guérin, Lunéville, c. 1895

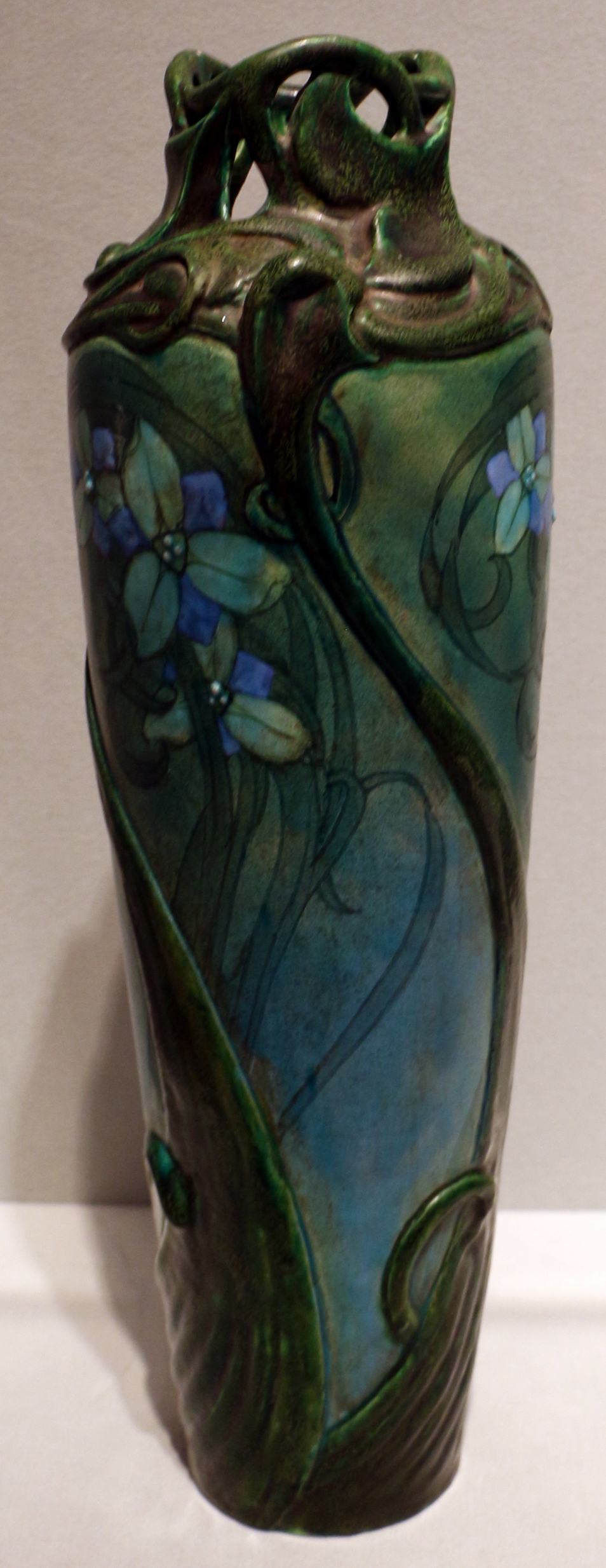
Vase c. 1902

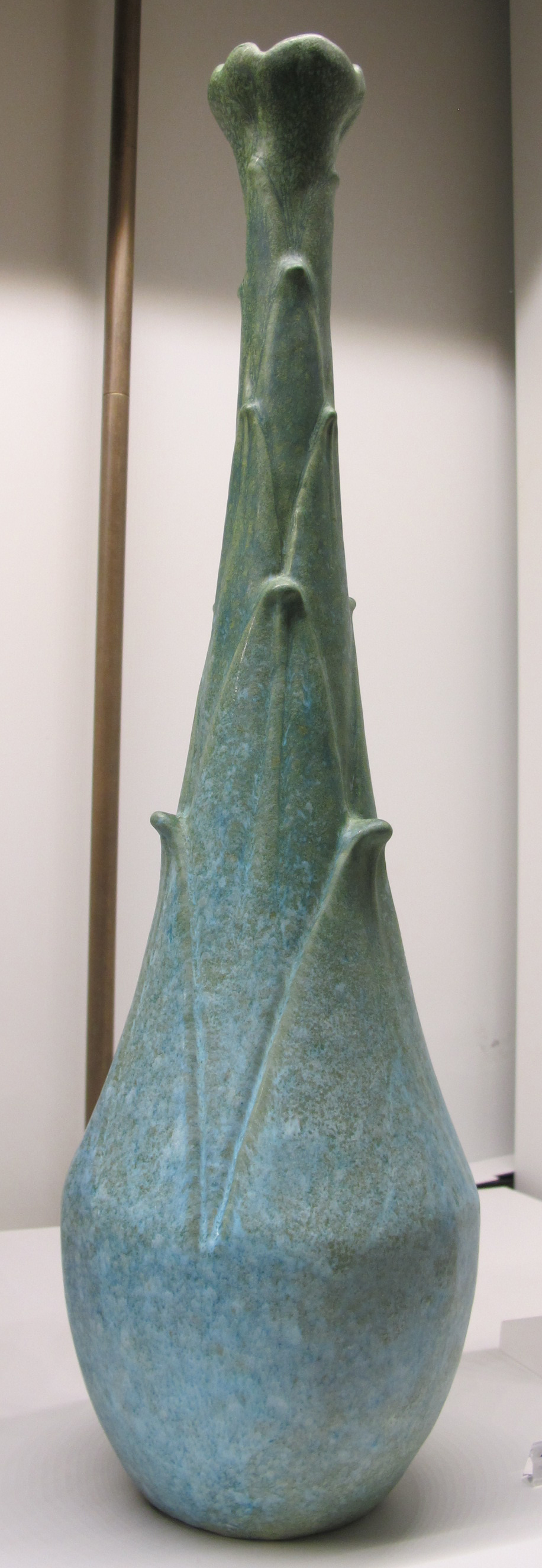
Vase c.1902

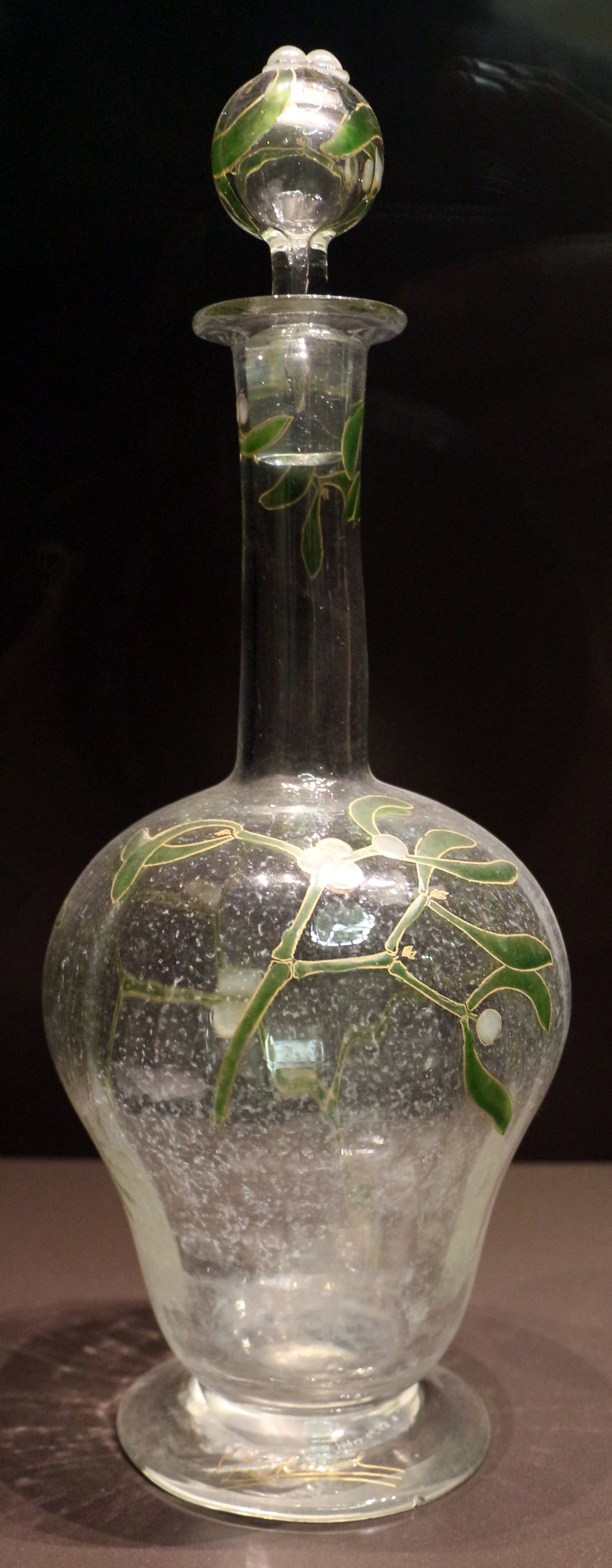
Glass decanter, Nancy, after 1901
