= Rajon =

Rajon may refer to:

- Districts of Belarus (singular: rajon)
- Districts of Latvia (singular: rajons)

== People ==
- Rajon Rondo (born 1986), American basketball player
- Claude Rajon (1866–1932), French politician
- Paul Adolphe Rajon (1843–1888), French painter and printmaker

== Others ==
- Rajon Music Group, one of the largest independent record labels in Australia

== See also ==
- Rajan (disambiguation)
- Raion, an administrative unit of several post-Soviet countries
