= Rajan (name) =

Rajan is an Indian masculine given name and surname.

== Notable people with this given name ==
- Rajan Bakhshi, Indian Army General officer
- Rajan Bala (1946–2009), Indian columnist
- Rajan Batra (born 1976), Indian film producer
- Rajan Batta, Indian-American engineer
- Rajan P. Dev (1951–2009), Indian film actor
- Rajan Devadas (1921–2014), American-Indian photojournalist
- Rajan Gurukkal (born 1948), Indian historian
- Rajan Hoole, Sri Lankan mathematician
- Rajan Ishan (born 1978), Nepali singer
- Rajan Kadiragamar (1922–2011), Ceylonese flag officer
- Rajan Khosa, Indian writer
- Rajan Koran (born 1981), Malaysian footballer
- Rajan Madhav (born 1975), Indian film director and screenwriter
- Rajan Mahadevan (born 1978), Indian playback singer
- Rajan Mahtani (born 1948), Zambian business magnate
- Rajan Mehra (1993-2010), Indian cricket umpire
- Rajan Menon (born 1953), Indian political scientist
- Rajan Mittal (born 1960), Indian entrepreneur
- Rajan Mukarung (born 1978), Nepali writer
- Rajan Pallan (born 1965), Indian politician
- Rajan Pillai (1947–1995), Indian businessman
- Rajan Rai, Nepali politician
- Rajan Raje (born 1957), Indian activist
- Rajan Salvi, Indian politician
- Rajan Sankaradi (1953-2016), Indian film director
- Rajan Sankaranarayanan (born 1968), Indian biologist
- Rajan Sarma (born 1956), Tamil film director
- Rajan Sawhney (born 1970–71), Canadian politician
- Rajan Saxena (management academic), Indian writer
- Rajan Saxena (physician), Indian medical doctor
- Rajan Seth (born 1952), Indian cricket umpire
- Rajan Singh, Indian politician
- Rajan Sippy, Indian actor
- Rajan Somasundaram, Indian composer
- Rajan Sushant (born 1955), Indian politician
- Rajan Tiwari, Indian legislator
- Rajan Vichare (born 1961), Indian politician

== Notable people with this surname ==
- Amol Rajan (born 1983), Indian-born British journalist and broadcaster
- Chhota Rajan (born 1959), Indian criminal and mobster
- Raghuram Rajan (born 1963), Indian economist
- Anna Rajan (born 1991), Indian film actress
- Pampadi Rajan, famous Indian elephant
