= Rajan =

Rajan may refer to:

- Raja, an Indian title for kings
- Rajan (name), an Indian name
- Rajan, a character in the 2024 Indian sci-fi film Kalki 2898 AD, portrayed by Brahmanandam
- Major Rajan, a fictional character in the 2012 Indian film Agent Vinod

== See also ==
- Raja (disambiguation)
- Rajon (disambiguation)
