= Creil-Montereau faience =

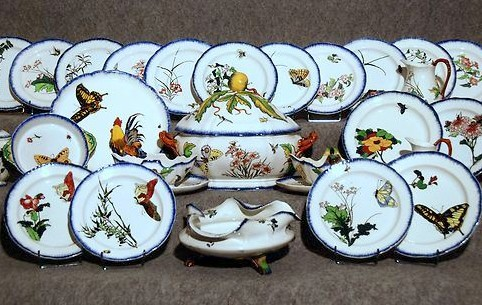
Félix Bracquemond designed the Service Rousseau, c. 1867, for the editor François-Eugène Rousseau, credited as the first expression of Japonisme in France.

Creil-Montereau faience is a faïence fine, a lead-glazed earthenware on a white body originating in the French communes of Creil, Oise and of Montereau, Seine-et-Marne, but carried forward under a unified direction since 1819. Emulating the creamware perfected by Josiah Wedgwood in the 1770s, and under the artistic and technical direction of native English potter entrepreneurs, the faience of Creil-Montereau introduced the industrial technique of transfer printing on pottery in France and raised it to a high state of perfection during its peak years in the 19th century.

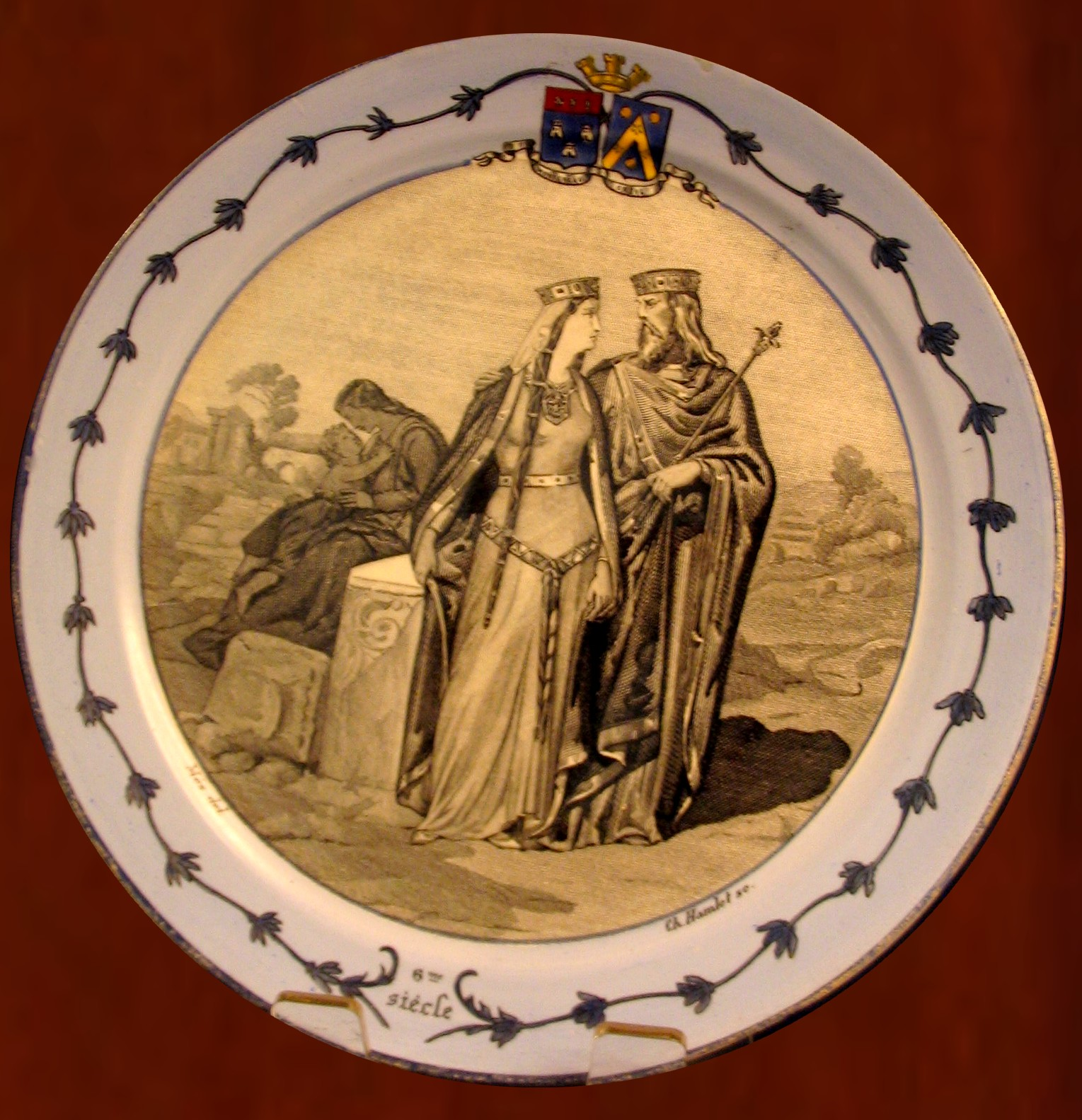
Transfer-printed and painted plate of faïence fine signed Charles Hamlet, Creil-Montereau, c. 1876-1884, (Musée Gallé-Juille)

== Montereau pottery ==
A faience manufactory at the village of Montereau-sur-le-Jard had been established by Jean Rognon, working there ca 1720–1740, but the manufacture of faïence fine, which requires a very white body under its colorless but glossy lead glaze, was begun in 1749, sited to the east of the village centre the quartier Saint-Nicolas. From 1755 to 1762 these kilns were operated by Etienne-François Mazois (1719–1762) who intended to rival the increasingly successful Queen's ware perfected by Josiah Wedgwood, that was driving the traditional tin-glazed earthenwares of France out of business. In 1760 Mazois was the entrepreneur of the royal manufacture at Nevers. His family maintained a shop for faience in quai de la Tournelle, Paris.

After a lapse the manufacture of faïence fine at Montereau was resumed in 1774 by an English partnership, Clark, Shaw et Cie, succeeded by Hall and Merlin-Hall, who found a new rival, 1796–1805, in another English entrepreneur, Christopher Potter (1751–1817). Potter first introduced in France the English technique of transfer printing from copperplate engravings onto earthenware and porcelain. This innovation transformed the pottery of Montereau from an artisanal phase to a proto-industry. Between 1805 and 1815, to avoid conflicts with the pottery of Merlin-Hall at Montereau, Potter set up works in a former tile manufactory nearby, at Cannes-Ecluse. In 1819 the proprietor of the competing manufactory at Creil bought out the owners of the Montereau works at a stiff price. The potteries at Montereau were fully incorporated with the works at Creil from 1840 to 1895 as the Faïenceries de Creil et Montereau. then in 1920 were hived off in association with the faience manufactory at Choisy-le-Roi,. The manufacture at Montereau finally closed in 1955, the abandoned works destroyed and the archives lost.

== Creil faience fine and porcelain ==
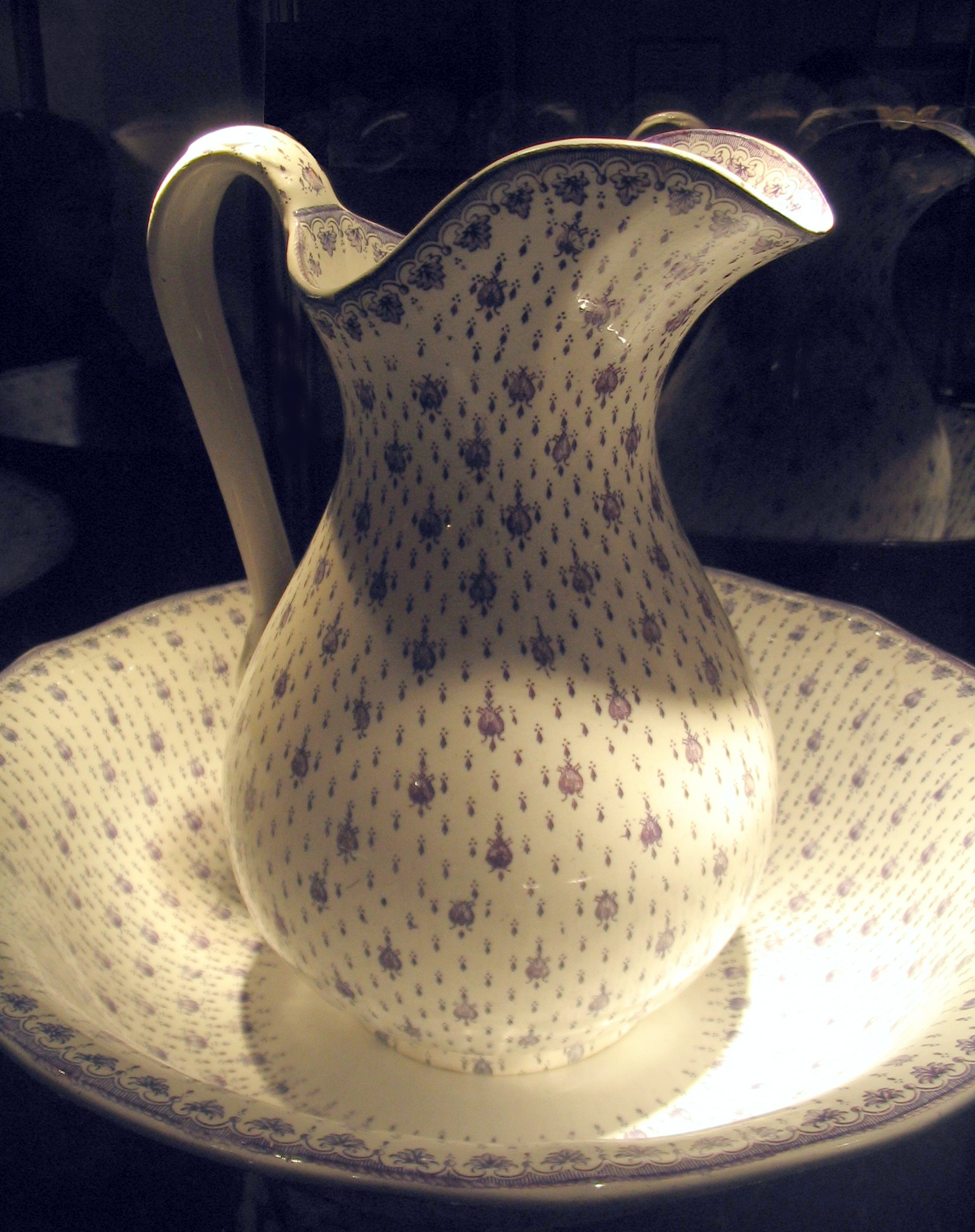
Ewer and basin with transfer-printed decor of diaper-pattern, Creil-Montereau (Musée Gallé-Juille at Creil)

A manufacture of ceramics at Creil was founded 7 prairial An V (26 May 1797) by a glass merchant of Paris, Robert Bray O'Reilly, but it closed in little more than a year. A more durable pottery works was founded in 1801. In 1840, when it was joined with Montereau, it was employing 900 workers. As at Montereau a series of British-born directors and proprietors shaped the manufactory during the 19th century. Jacques Bagnall was born in 1762 at Burslem in the heart of the Staffordshire Potteries; in 1784 he was in France, working as a modeller in the manufactory of "English stoneware" (grès anglais) at Douai. For a time he directed the manufactory of porcelain at Chantilly for its owner, Christopher Potter, before taking on the direction of the pottery at Creil in 1802. As director of design at Creil he was responsible for a splendid body of work, sometimes copying the neoclassical styles of Wedgwood and other fashionable English makers. A table service of black stoneware (grès noir) like the black jasperware of Wedgwood can be seen at the museum at Creil.

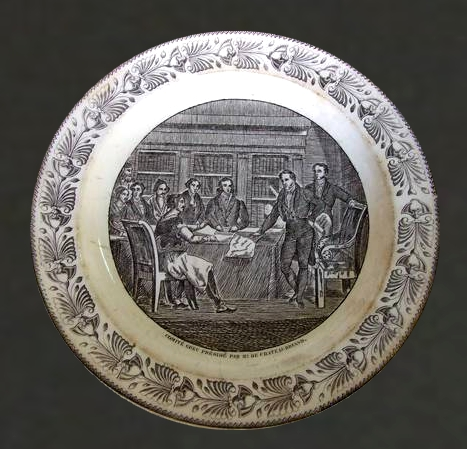
Faïence fine plate one of a monochromatic transfer-printed series commemorating events of Greek independence, Montereau, ca 1830.

Bagnall died ar Creil in 1825. From 1811 the director of the pottery at Creil was Charles Gaspard Alexandre Saint-Cricq Casaux; in 1819 he purchased the works at Montereau, and fused the two in 1840 as Creil-Montereau. The following year Louis-Martin Lebeuf (1792–1854) and Jean Baptiste Gratien Milliet (1797–1875) purchased the amalgamated works. Two Englishmen, George Vernon, father and son, served as director and assistant director until 1849: they introduced the manufacture of soft-paste porcelain. The Vernons' successor, Henry Félix Anatole Barluet (born in 1802 at l'Aigle, Orne) was a local man, whose mother was a Lebeuf. (Louis Lebeuf and his son were both directors of the works at Montereau; Adrien Lebeuf de Montgermont, was the town's mayor.) As the major employers at Creil, From 1866 Barluet oversaw the development of the worker city of Saint-Médard to house his employees. He served as mayor of Creil until his death. Under his regime, the transfer-printed decors of Creil-Montereau took new directions.

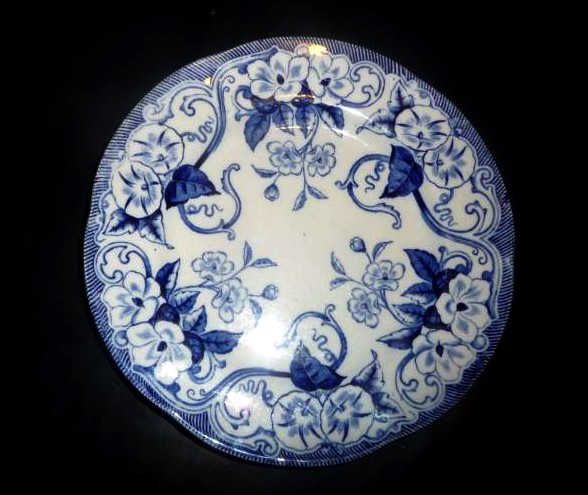
Plate in "Flora" pattern (here, bindweed), end of the 19th century
