= Rajan Raje =

Indian social activist

Rajan Raghunath Raje
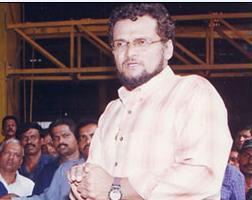

Founder, Leader and Chairperson of the DharmaRajya Paksha
- In office 16 November 2011 – present

Personal details
- Born: 18 September 1957 Thane, Maharashtra, India
- Party: DharmaRajya Paksha (2011–present)
- Spouse: Ranjan Raje
- Children: Rugved Raje (Son); Rucha Raje (Daughter)
- Parent(s): Raghunath Raje; Nalini Raje
- Education: Maharashtra Vidyalaya, Thane
- Profession: Trade union, Activism, Politician
- Website: www.rajanraje.com

Rajan Raghunath Raje (born 18 September 1957) is an Indian social activist and Labour Union Leader. Raje is also the founder and president of the regional political party, DharmaRajya Paksha in the state of Maharashtra, India.

== Personal life ==
Raje grew up in Thane, Maharashtra, a region close to Mumbai. He is a law graduate from the University of Mumbai. Raje stood first in SSC exam among the Marathi students in the district and ranked 16th in the state for the same exam. Raje also secured the National Scholarship, the State Scholarship and Sir Dorabji Tata Trust Scholarship.

Rajan Raje published poems in the novel Rajhans. He is married to Ranjan. They have one son and one daughter.

== Political career ==
Rajan Raje has been a trade union leader for 30 years. As a union leader, Raje has fought against contract work systems (i.e. employee contracts) and liberalization and privatization policies in the production and services industries. Raje's unions were run under the organization 'Dharmarajya Kamgar-Karmachari Mahasangh', which later formed into his political party established in 2011.

In 2009, Rajan Raje entered politics by joining Maharashtra Navnirman Sena. Raje had contested both Lok Sabha and State assembly election as a candidate of Maharashtra Navnirman Sena from Thane constituency, but did not get the seat. Raje left the Maharashtra Navnirman Sena citing ideological difference between him and the mainstream party.

On 16 November 2011, Rajan Raje established his own political party, DharmaRajya Paksha(DRP) after quitting Maharashtra Navnirman Sena.

== Issues and activism ==
Raje discussing with Arvind Kejriwal at the time of launching Aam Aadmi Party, at Roha, Maharashtra

Rajan Raje has protested the Shai dam project of the Government of Maharashtra.

Raje opposed the proposed Jaitapur Nuclear Power Project, involved in protests, meetings and appeals for action beginning in 2011. Also in 2011, Raje produced a documentary film High Power about issues faced by the local population displaced due to India's first atomic power station at Tarapur, constructed in 1962. The censor board of India, in its primary screening, denied a certificate saying the subject of the film is against government policy. In May 2013, the film was awarded a 'Yellow Oscar' at the 3rd International Uranium Film Festival of Rio de Janeiro and received the world premiere in Brazil.

Raje has been involved with a number of issues with educational institutions. In 2009, he was involved with a protest against a proposed student fee rate hike in private educational institutions. In 2010, Raje led a union of working staff at Parshvanath College of Engineering against the management of the University of Mumbai over questions of mismanagement, non-payment of salaries and sexual harassment. In November 2012, Rajan Raje instigated an investigation into an alleged forgery at the Patil College of Engineering in Chunabhatti, Mumbai, which had resulted in an unjustified increase in student fees.

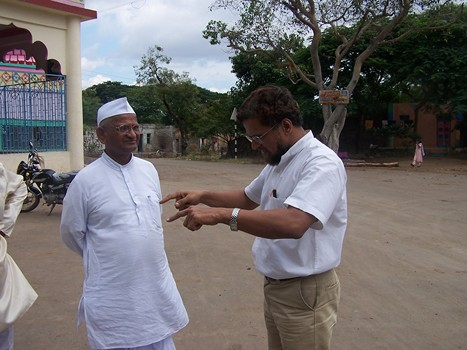
Rajan Raje discussing with Anna Hazare at Ralegan Siddhi, Maharashtra

Raje has supported Anna Hazare's anti-corruption movement and was one of the prominent members to fight for the Jan Lokpal Bill along with Hazare at a local level.

Raje has supported decreased development in Western Ghat where illegal mining operations threaten the environment. He organized a conference in 2013, and has advised the government of India on this issue.
