= Paul Adolphe Rajon =

French painter (1843–1888)

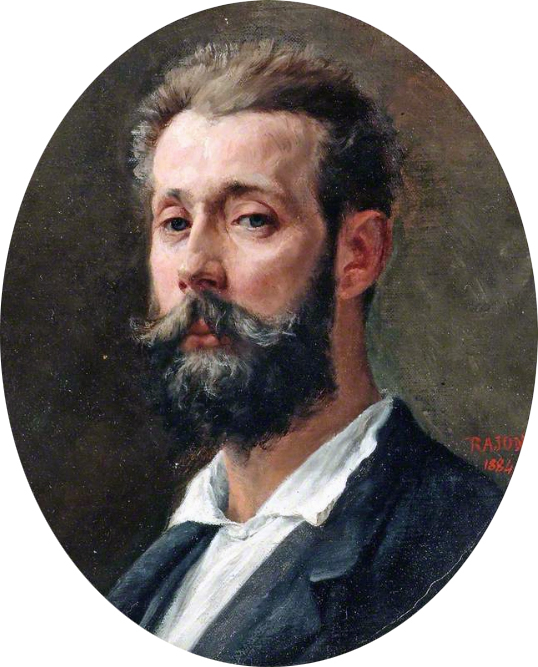
Self-portrait (1884)

Paul-Adolphe Rajon (1843 – 8 June 1888) was a French painter and printmaker, who started his career as a photographer.

== Early life ==
Born at Dijon, Rajon was the third child of Jean Marie Rajon, a hairdresser, by his marriage with Caroline Jaugey, a shop girl some thirty years younger. They had a daughter, Marguerite, born in 1839, and another son, Charles Henri, born in 1840.

In 1857, Paul Rajon began to work for Pierre Joseph Meurisse, a photographer in Metz who had married his sister Marguerite, as a retoucher of portraits. From 1859 to 1860 he attended an art course given by Auguste Migette at the school of design in Metz, befriending another student, Émile Boilvin. In 1862, having saved a little money, Rajon went to Paris, aiming to pursue his career as a retoucher and also to deepen his study of painting. There, he and Boilvin were accepted as students at the École des Beaux-Arts and were taught by Isidore-Alexandre-Augustin Pils.

== Career ==
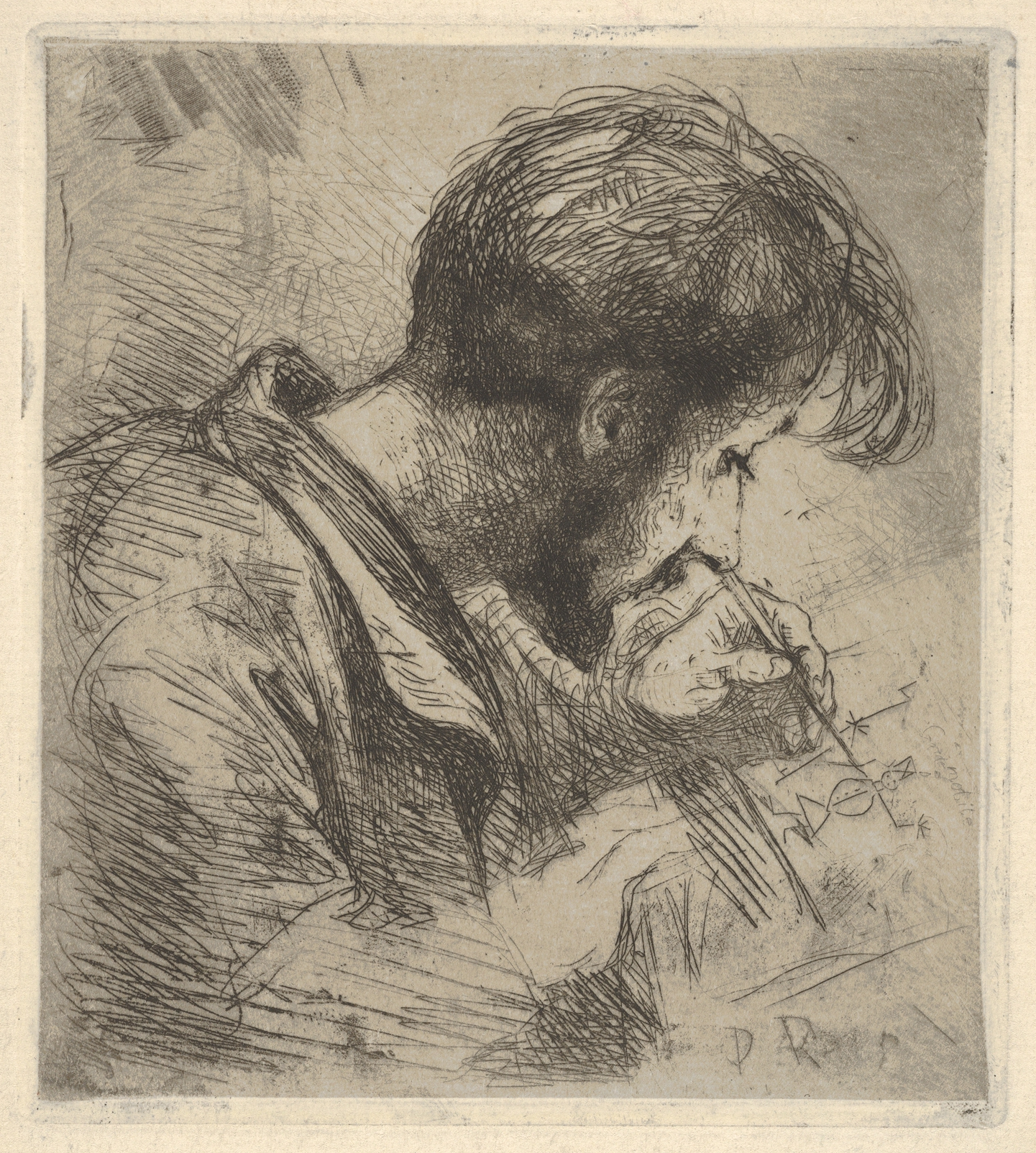
Rajon at work, portrait by Boilvin

A friend of Philippe Burty, Félix Bracquemond, and Louis-Charles-Auguste Steinheil, Rajon was awarded medals at the Paris Salons of 1869, 1870, and 1873, and at the Exposition Universelle of 1878.

During the Franco-German War of 1870, Rajon enlisted in the National Guard battalion Tirailleurs de la Seine and saw active service in fighting at La Malmaison.

Rajon enjoyed a long and healthy career in Great Britain. He etched both contemporary works and Old Masters, as well as portraits, including ones of Ivan Turgenev, Théophile Gautier, John Stuart Mill, Charles Darwin, and Alfred, Lord Tennyson. He was critically praised in France, Great Britain, and the United States, through his acquaintance with the New York-based American print dealer Frederick Keppel.

Rajon suffered a wasting illness, during which he was looked after by a British friend, Frank Dicey. He died on 8 June 1888 at Auvers-sur-Oise, of pneumonia.

== Selected works ==
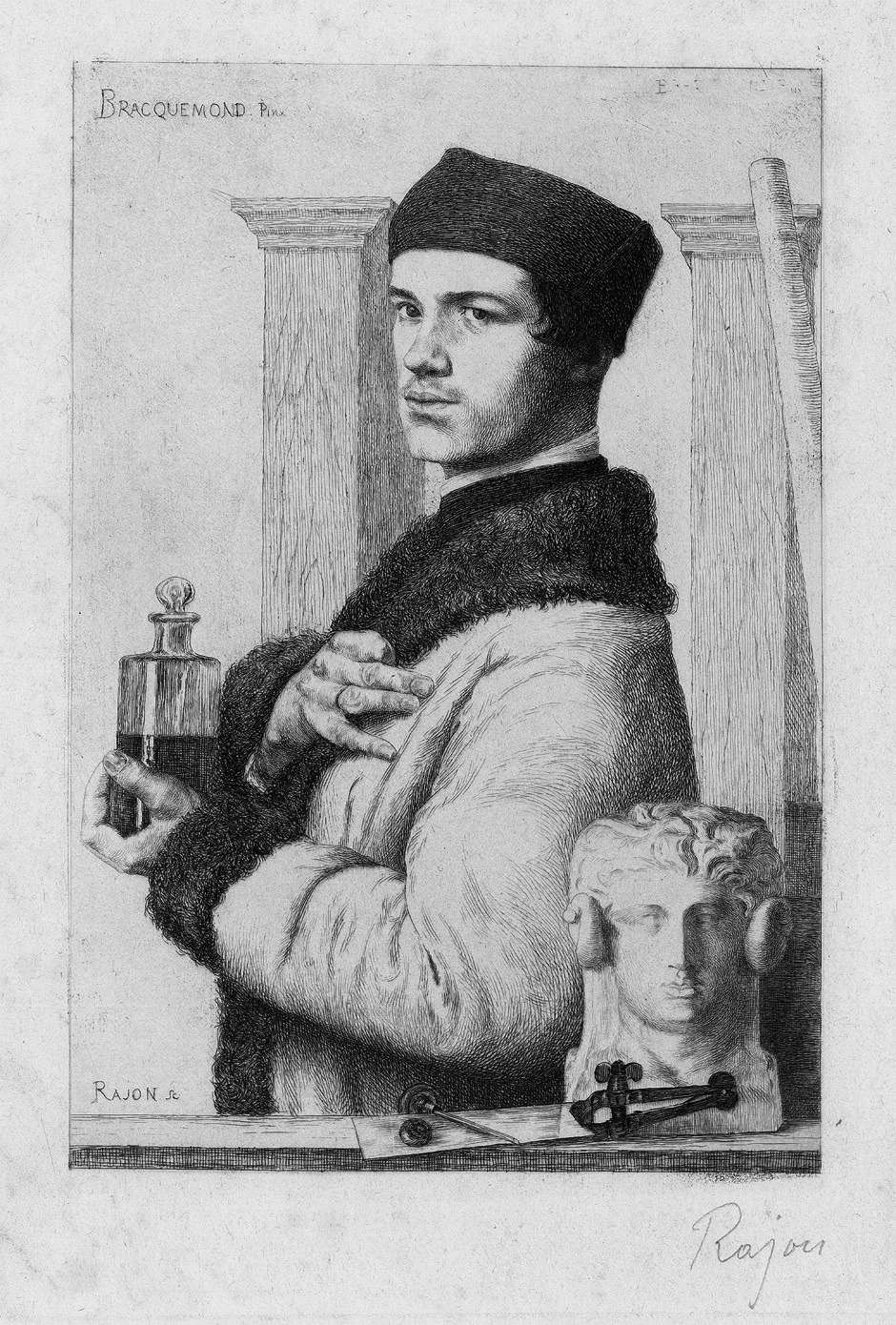
Portrait of Félix Bracquemond (1878)

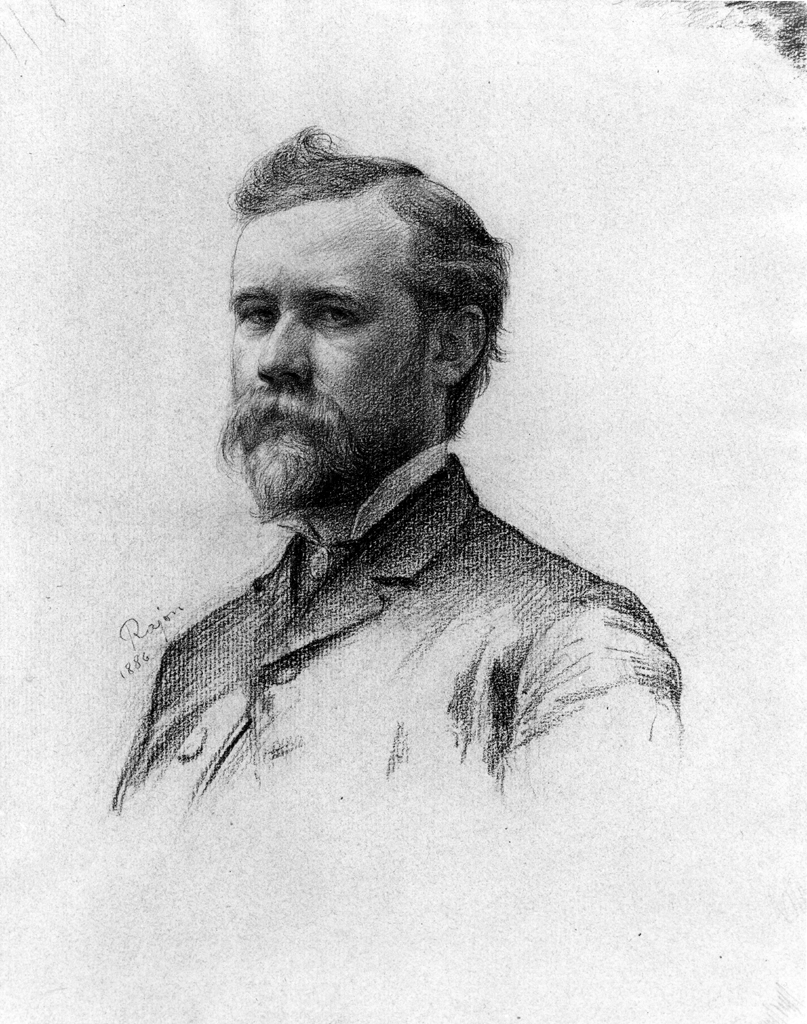
Portrait of Henry Walters (1886)

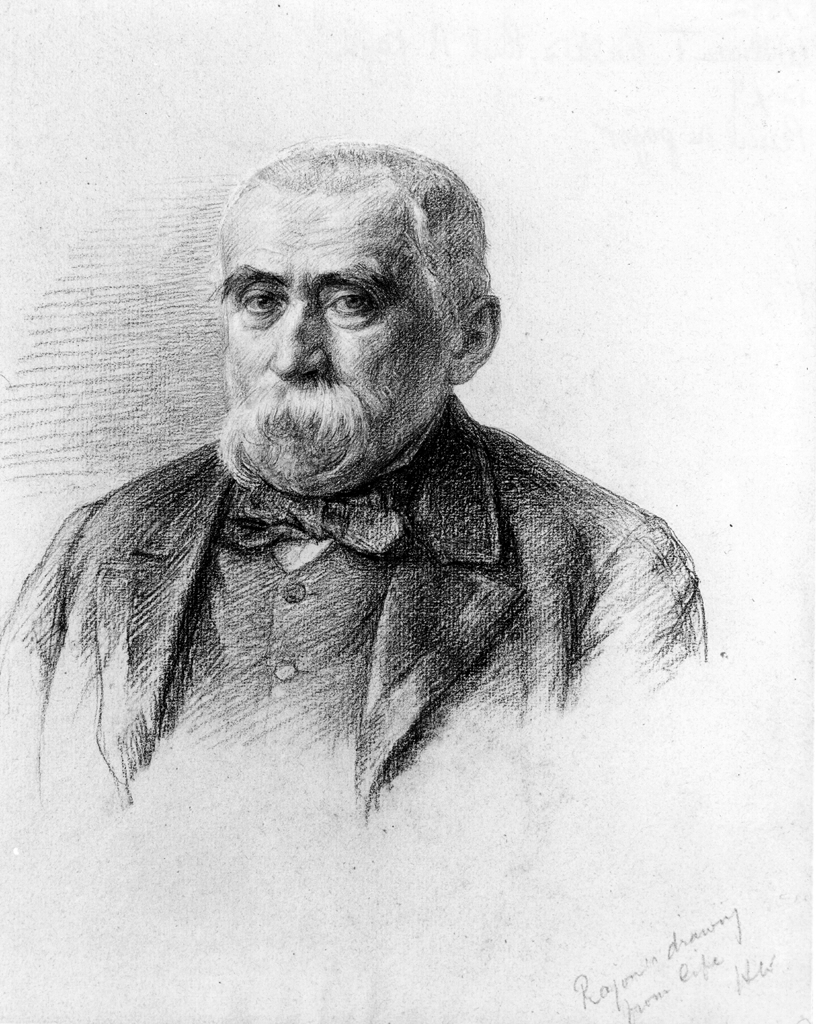
Portrait of William T. Walters (1887)

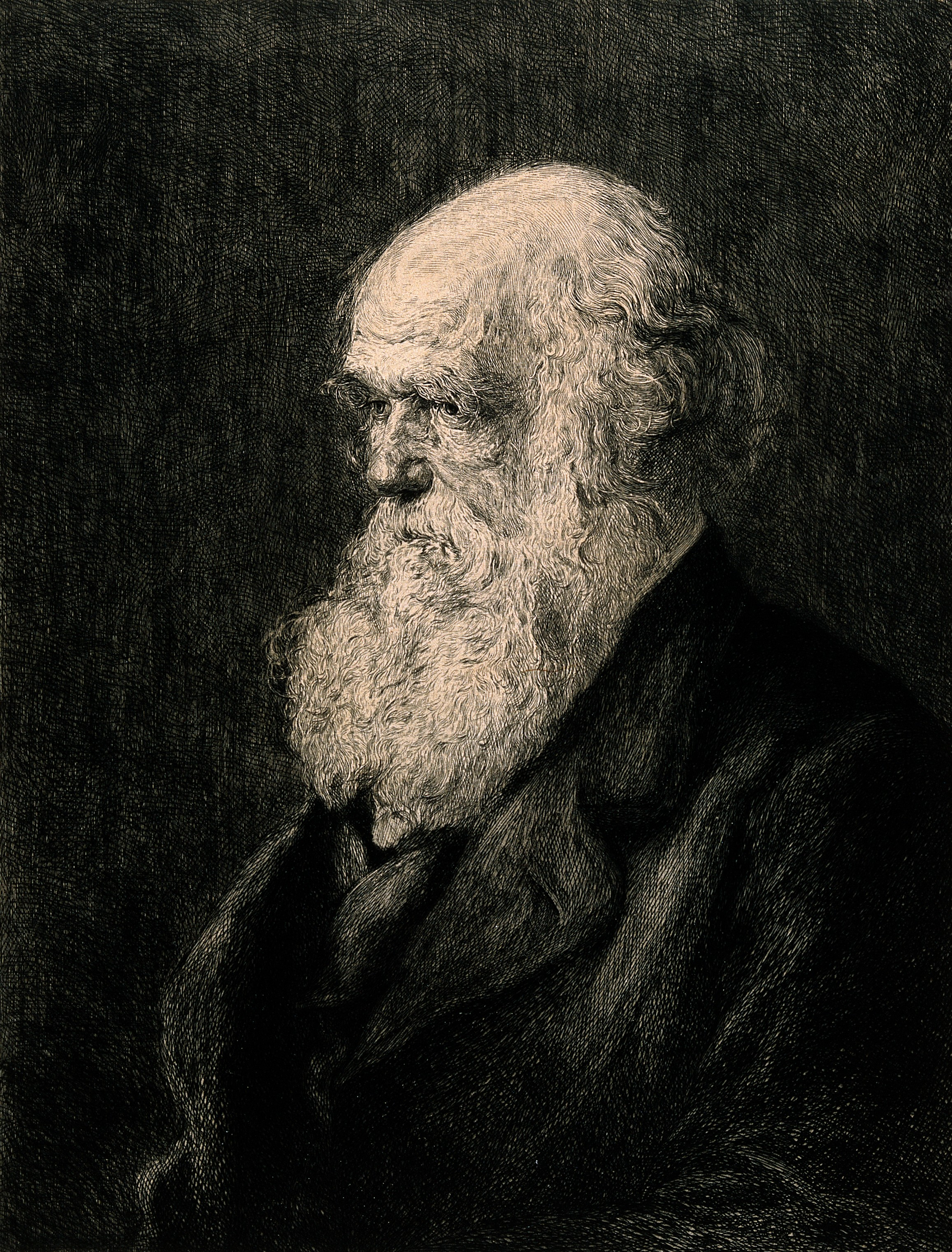
Portrait of Charles Darwin (c. 1880)
