= Société du Jing-lar =

The Société du Jing-lar, or Jing-lar Club, was a club of Japonists founded by Philippe Burty in Paris in 1867.

== See also ==
- International Exposition (1867)
