= Rajan Batta =

American operations research scientist

Associate Dean for Faculty Affairs and Recognition, SEAS University at Buffalo

Personal details
- Born: Banaras, India
- Citizenship: United States
- Education: Indian Institute of Technology Delhi; Massachusetts Institute of Technology
- Scientific career
- Fields: Industrial and Systems Engineering; Operations Research; Military Operations Research; Facility Location; Transportation
- Workplaces: University at Buffalo

Rajan Batta is an American operations research scientist, and a SUNY Distinguished Professor at the University at Buffalo. Batta earned his doctorate in Operations Research in 1984 from the Massachusetts Institute of Technology and joined the University at Buffalo faculty that same year. He also has had several administrative appointments, including Chair of the Department of Industrial and Systems Engineering (1994-2003), Interim Dean (2011-2012, 2019-2020), and Associate Dean in various capacities of the School of Engineering and Applied Sciences (SEAS). At present, he serves in the role of Associate Dean for Faculty Affairs and Recognition.

== Education ==
Batta received his undergraduate degree (BTech) in Mechanical engineering from the Indian Institute of Technology (IIT) Delhi, India in 1980, where he held merit scholarships for all five years of study. He received his PhD degree in Operations Research in 1984 from the Department of Electrical Engineering and Computer Science, Massachusetts Institute of Technology, Cambridge, Massachusetts.

== Research ==
Batta is a published author in various fields of operations research, applied operations research, military operations research, facility location, and transportation.

== As an Author ==
Batta's research is in hazmat routing, location modeling, emergency response, and military and security applications. He published on a regular basis in premier journals, e.g., Computers & Operations Research, European Journal of Operational Research, Management Science, Military Operations Research, Transportation Science, Operations Research, and Socio-Economic Planning Sciences. Batta was listed in the top 50 "most productive and influential authors" in an article commemorating the 40th year of publication of European Journal of Operational Research (EJOR).

== Editorial Service ==
Batta serves as Editor-in-Chief of Socio-Economic Planning Sciences (2021–present), Associate Editor of Operations Research (2024–present), and Departmental Editor of IISE Transactions (2001–present).

== Graduate Mentorship ==
Batta has supervised or co-supervised 60 completed doctoral dissertations and 61 completed master’s theses. His doctoral students have gone on to faculty positions at institutions including MIT, Iowa State University, the US Naval Academy, Texas A&M University, and the Naval Postgraduate School, as well as analyst roles at major companies and government agencies.

== Research and Leadership Awards ==
Batta is a Fellow of two professional societies: Institute of Industrial and Systems Engineers (IISE) and the Institute for Operations Research and the Management Sciences (INFORMS). The INFORMS fellow citation states "He is honored for advanced theoretical research and use-inspired models for addressing location, layout, security and HAZMAT transport problems; and for sustained outstanding academic education and leadership."

Batta is also a recipient of the Frank and Lillian Gilbreth Industrial Engineering Award from IISE. As per the IISE website, this is the highest and most esteemed honor bestowed by IISE. It recognizes those who have distinguished themselves through contributions to the welfare of mankind in the field of industrial engineering. The contributions are of the highest caliber and nationally or internationally recognized.

A list of significant awards is as follows;

- Koopman Prize for outstanding publication in military operations research by the Military and Security Society, INFORMS, 2024
- Lifetime Achievement in Locational Analysis Award, Institute for Operations Research and the Management Sciences, 2023
- Fellow, Institute for Operations Research and the Management Sciences, 2022
- Frank and Lillian Gilbreth Industrial Engineering Award, Institute of Industrial and Systems Engineers, 2022
- Best paper award from the journal Military Operations Research, 2020
- Koopman Prize for outstanding publication in military operations research by the Military and Security Society, INFORMS, 2018
- Award for Technical Innovation in Industrial Engineering, Institute of Industrial and Systems Engineers, 2016
- Albert G. Holzman Distinguished Educator Award, Institute of Industrial Engineers, 2015
- Best paper award for the journal IIE Transactions: Design and Manufacturing, 2013
- AIIMS-MOPTA Optimization Modeling Competition Winner, Lehigh University, 2012
- Dr. David F. Baker Distinguished Research Award, Institute of Industrial Engineers, 2008
- SUNY Research Foundation Award for Research and Scholarship, 2007
- Fellow, Institute of Industrial Engineers, 2006
- Best paper award from the journal Military Operations Research, 2005
- Sustained Achievement Award, Exceptional Scholar Program, University at Buffalo, 2002

== Teaching Awards ==
- University at Buffalo Excellence in Graduate Student Mentoring Award, 2014-2015
- SUNY Chancellor's Award for Excellence in Teaching, 2007
