= L'Estampe originale =

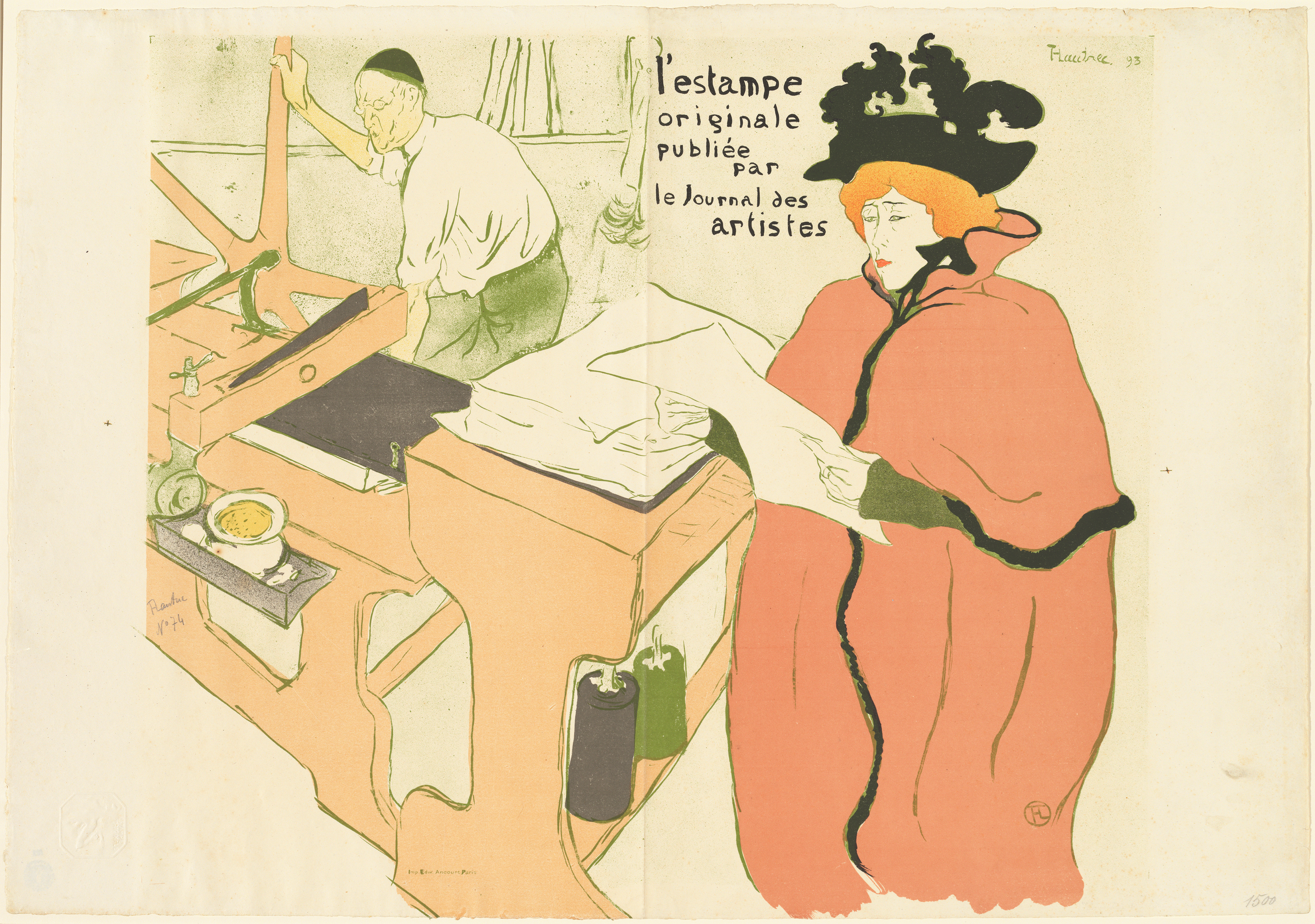
Henri de Toulouse-Lautrec, Cover for issue 1 of L'Estampe originale, 1893, lithograph in 6 colours. The dancer Jane Avril peruses a print Père Cotelle has just run off.

L'Estampe originale was a French periodical publishing portfolios of original prints in a limited edition of 100 for subscribers. It produced nine issues quarterly between 1893 and 1895, containing a total of 95 original prints by a very distinguished group of 74 artists, including Henri de Toulouse-Lautrec, Gauguin, Renoir, Pissarro, Whistler, Paul Signac, Odilon Redon, Rodin, Henri Fantin-Latour, Félix Bracquemond, Félicien Rops and Puvis de Chavannes. Almost all of Les Nabis contributed: Pierre Bonnard, Maurice Denis, Paul Ranson, Édouard Vuillard, Ker-Xavier Roussel, Félix Vallotton, and Paul Sérusier. British artists included William Nicholson, Charles Ricketts, Walter Crane and William Rothenstein; besides Whistler, Joseph Pennell was the only American.

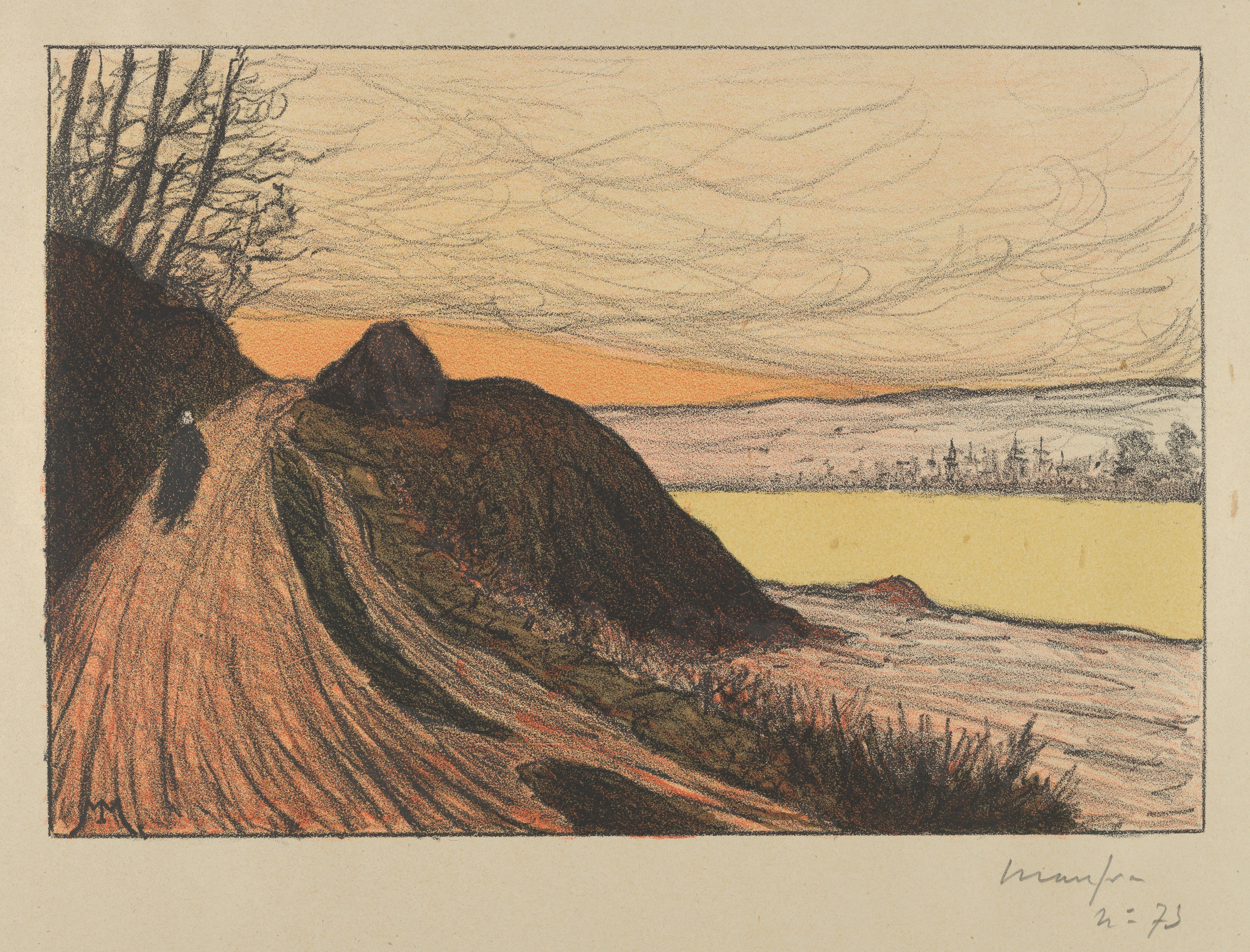
Maxime Maufra, The Road from Gaud (La Route de Gaud), lithograph in 4 colours, 1893

Commentators at the time and subsequently have unanimously praised the success of the publisher, André Marty, in collecting a stellar group of artists, and in many cases getting them to produce some of their finest prints. Together the group display the main currents in the diverse and vibrant Parisian art scene of the period. After the Etching Revival beginning in the 1850s, France saw another wave of productivity in printmaking in the 1890s, with a great variety of techniques, subjects, and styles.

L'Estampe originale has a notably large number of figure subjects compared with typical prints from earlier decades, but there are many landscapes and city views, traditional in style and not, and a wide range of other subjects. The rising influence of Art Nouveau is very apparent, but the more traditional styles of the Etching Revival are also well-represented. There is a great variety of printmaking techniques used, some of which would only have been possible in a relatively small edition of 100. Of the prints, 60 were lithographs, 26 in the various intaglio techniques (with a third of these using colour), 7 woodcuts, a wood engraving and a gypsograph. A striking common factor is the high proportion using colour, in many different techniques, not just the lithographs.

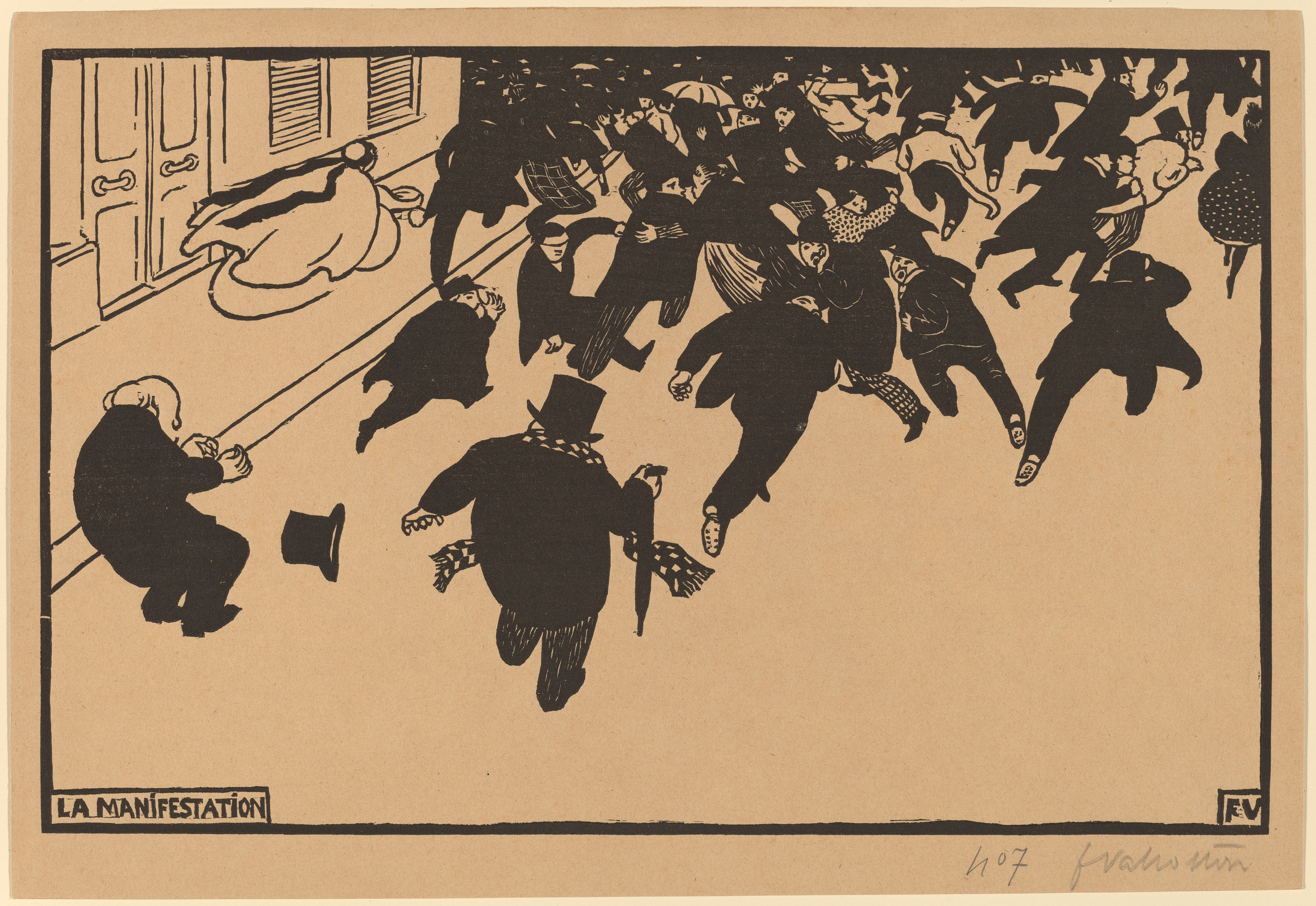
Félix Vallotton, La Manifestation ("The Demonstration"), woodcut, 1893

Each issue was printed in only 100 impressions. The first eight issues each had ten loose prints in a paper cover or wrapper; the last was entitled Album de clôture ("Closing album") and the fourteen prints were between two paper-covered boards secured by two cream satin ribbons. This was apparently intended to now hold all the previous issues as well, and the title included a pun on "closure". Many buyers removed prints from the album to frame and hang, as had been anticipated. The prints were nearly all newly created for L'Estampe originale, had different sizes, and were often printed on different papers; indeed not all were by the same printer. They were signed and numbered, and the margins embossed with a small blind stamp, common to all the series.

== History ==
=== First incarnation ===
The title L'Estampe originale had an earlier life, under different direction but in a similar format and with some of the same artists, in 1888 and 1889. Three issues were published, the first of ten prints in 150 copies, costing 100 francs. The six or more artists contributing to the first issue included four who also made prints for the revived publication: Bracquemond, Henri Boutet, Henri-Patrice Dillon and Auguste-Louis Lepère, and the other issues, about which much is obscure, also used artists who appeared in the revived title. Lepère appears to have been a key figure in organizing the title.

When Jacquelynn Baas was writing her article in 1983, no complete set of the early issues from the 1880s was apparently known to survive in any museum, and a note reported with some excitement that another print scholar "had recently seen a copy of the first issue" in a French private collection. The title as revived under Marty was "better-organized, better-known, and, it must be admitted, higher-quality", not to mention better value. Unless stated otherwise, references to the title in this article refer to Marty's issues. All the prints in the early three issues were monochrome; the large number of images in colour, using a variety of techniques, is a striking feature of the revived issues.

Camille Martin, cover for L'Estampe Originale issue 5, celebrating the second year, colour lithograph, 1894

L'Estampe originale is also not to be confused with the similar but much cheaper L'Estampe Moderne, which also had two incarnations, the first of three issues in 1894–1895, and the more successful second of 24 issues in 1897–1899. These were all lithographs in a much larger print run, leaning more to Art Nouveau.

=== Second incarnation ===
The revived L'Estampe originale was published by the otherwise obscure, but evidently well-connected, figure of André Marty, about whom little is known. He published a number of books, mostly on history, but including one on printmaking in 1906, and became director of the weekly Journal des Artistes (of 17, Rue de Rome) in 1893, but left in 1894, taking L'Estampe originale with him. Marty bought the rights to use the title from the publishers of the 1888 project.

None of the internal documentation of the enterprise is known to have survived, leaving much unclear for scholars. Apart from the nine portfolios, the only other activity of the L'Estampe originale imprint was in 1893, as publisher of Le Café-concert, a book by Georges Montorgueil illustrated with lithographs (all in black apart from the lettering on the cover) by Toulouse-Lautrec and Henri-Gabriel Ibels, who both contributed to L'Estampe originale.

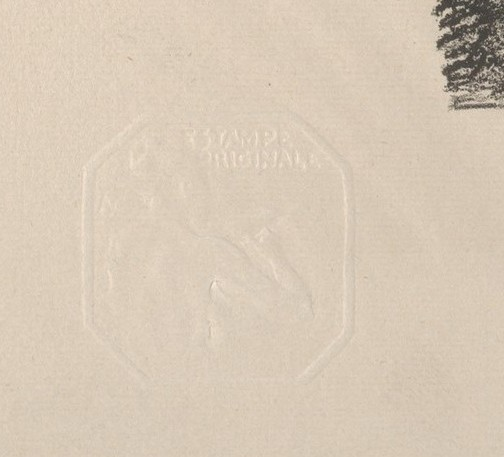
The blind stamp used on every print, Alexandre Charpentier

A short prospectus for the revived L'Estampe originale was published early in 1893, beginning "... the Journal des Artistes will publish ...". This explained the contents of the album, and listed 51 artists who had promised works; all but six, and these minor figures, later contributed. An "accompanying text" by the critic and arts civil servant Roger Marx was promised, and his "Preface" of some two pages did eventually appear in the sixth volume, effectively the only text in the project other than lists of the prints.

The first album was promised for 30 March 1893; the initial subscription price was 150 francs for a year, for four issues with ten prints each. The price to later buyers would be 200 francs. This represented far better value for subscribers than the earlier issues of 1888/89. The price of the final issue, outside the annual subscription, and with more prints in the single issue, as well as the board covers, is not known. It is not known if the subscription offer sold out, but by 1898 it was reported that a complete set cost 600 francs, presumably on the art market rather than from the publishers.

The project was probably always intended to be short-lived; a letter from Camille Pissarro to his son Lucien Pissarro (both contributors) dated 28 January 1894 referred to a lithograph he had already completed for "the last number of Marty's portfolio", which was not to be published for over a year. This indicates the degree of forward planning Marty used.

== Count of prints ==
The 95 entries in the Stein and Karshan catalogue are made up as follows:

- Eight issues of ten prints each, giving 80 (including two paper covers, for issues I and V)
- Issue IX with fourteen prints (including a paper cover)
- The blind stamp, sometimes cut from the margin and mounted separately by collectors (Cat. 15). Designed by Alexandre Charpentier, who also had a lithograph in album VII, it shows a half-length nude woman seen from behind, with the title, set in an octagonal frame. It is just under two inches in each dimension, and is usually placed near a corner of the lower margin, where there is room, or in a quiet area within the composition.

A small decorative woodcut by George Auriol, printed with the Preface in issue VI (Cat. 3) is counted as one of the prints.

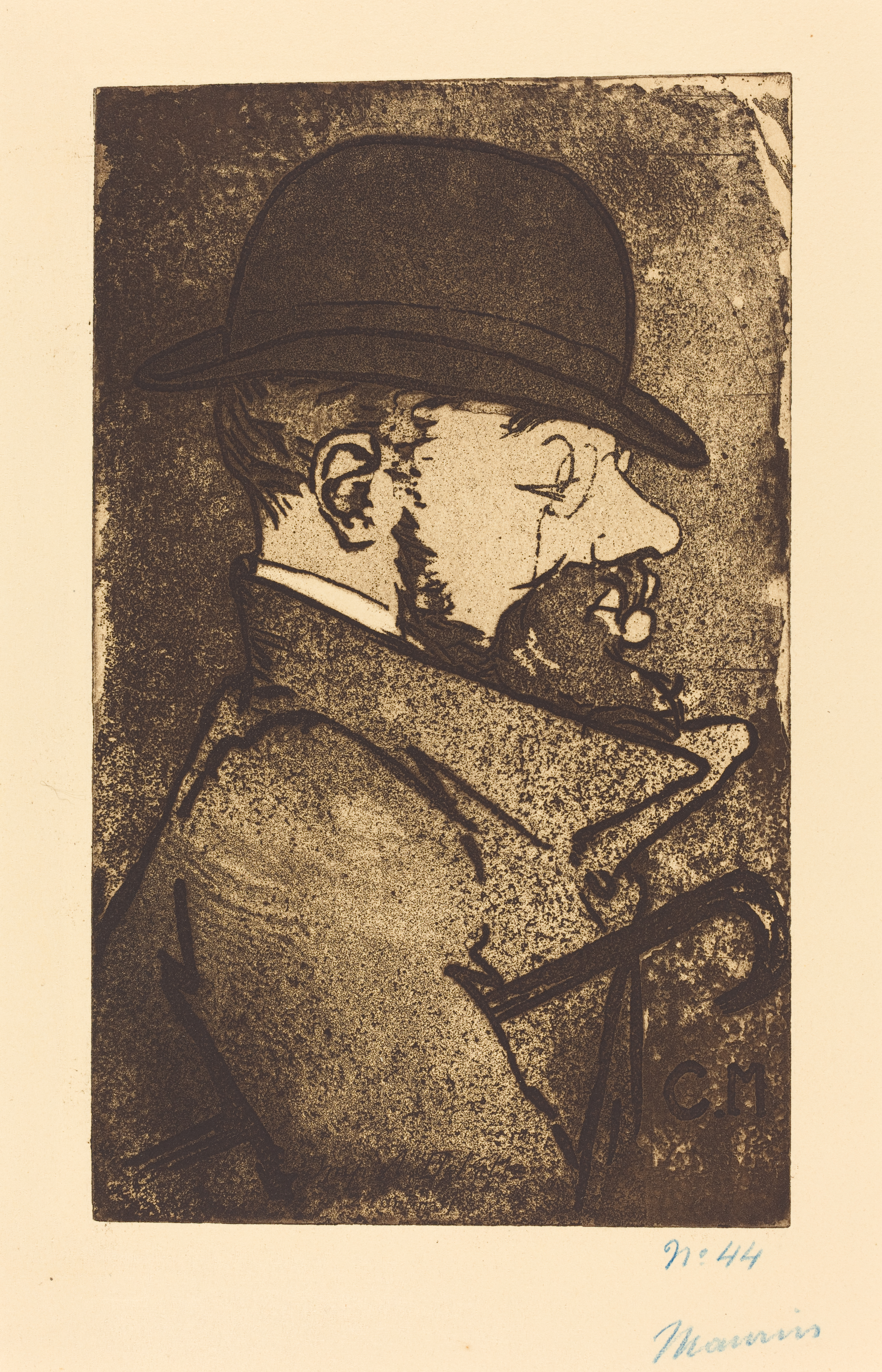
Charles Maurin, Portrait of Henri de Toulouse-Lautrec, 1890, aquatint printed in brown

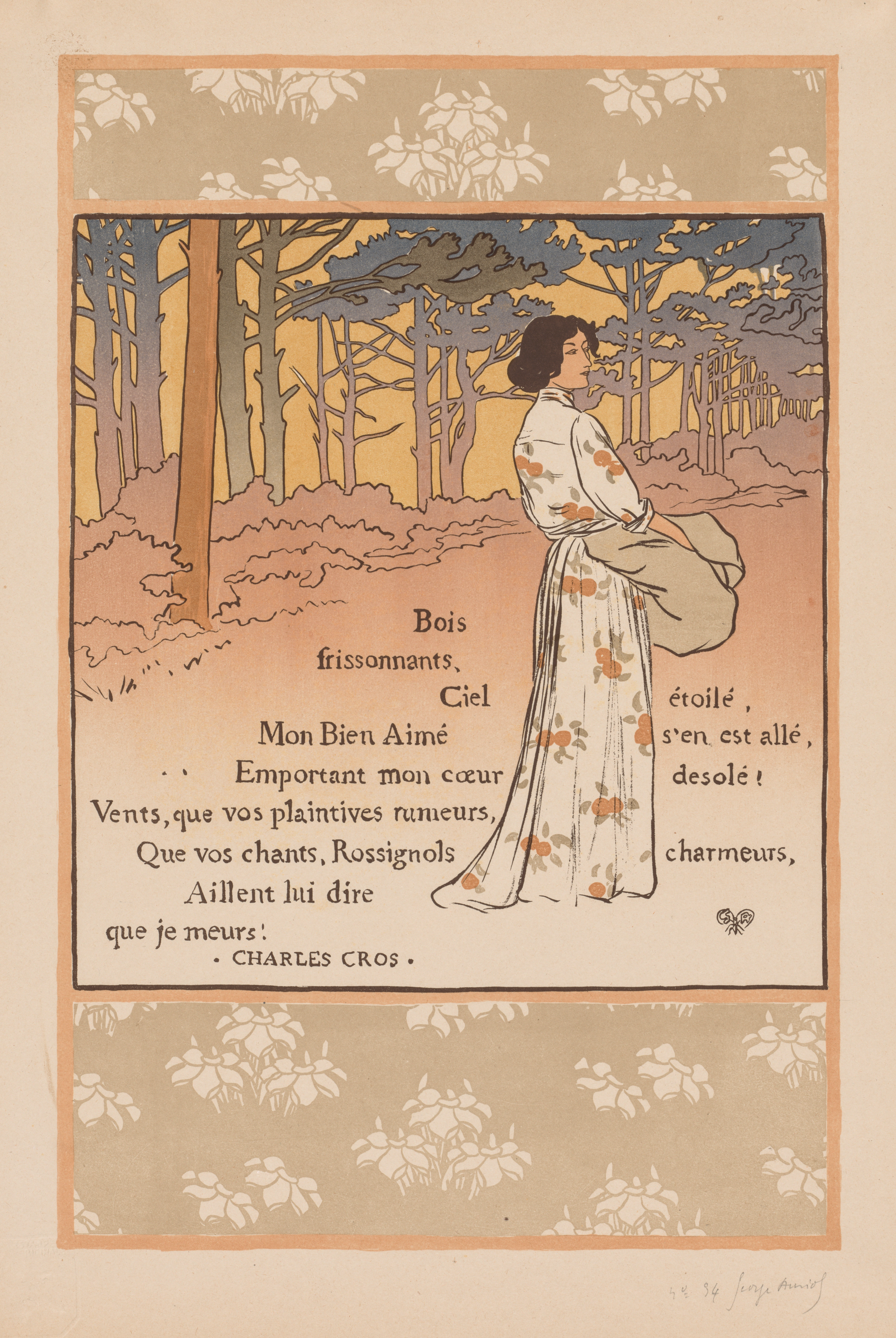
George Auriol, Trembling Woods (Bois Frissonants), 1893, colour lithograph

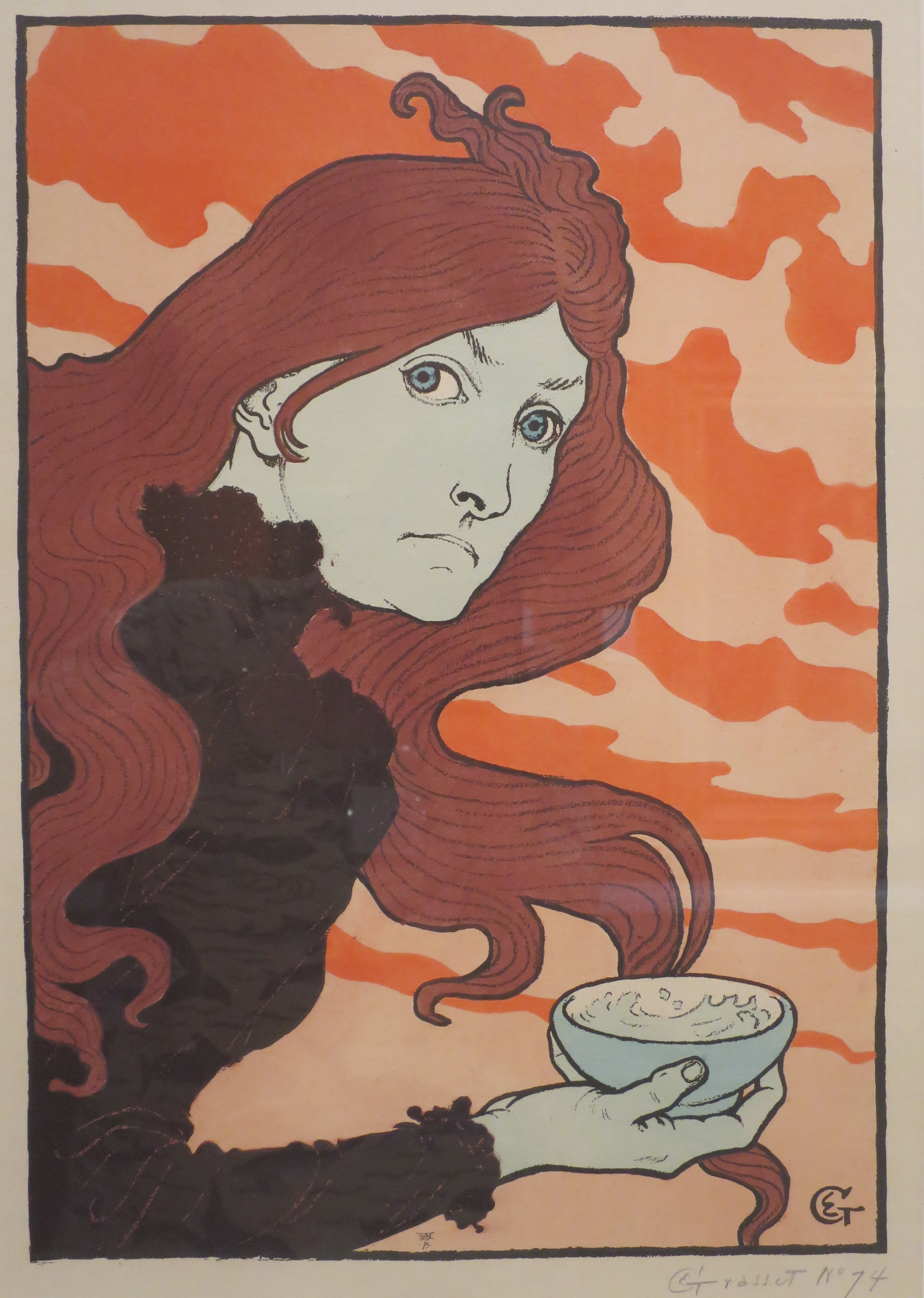
Eugène Grasset, La Vitrioleuse ("The Acid Thrower") 1894, lithograph with hand-stencilled colours.

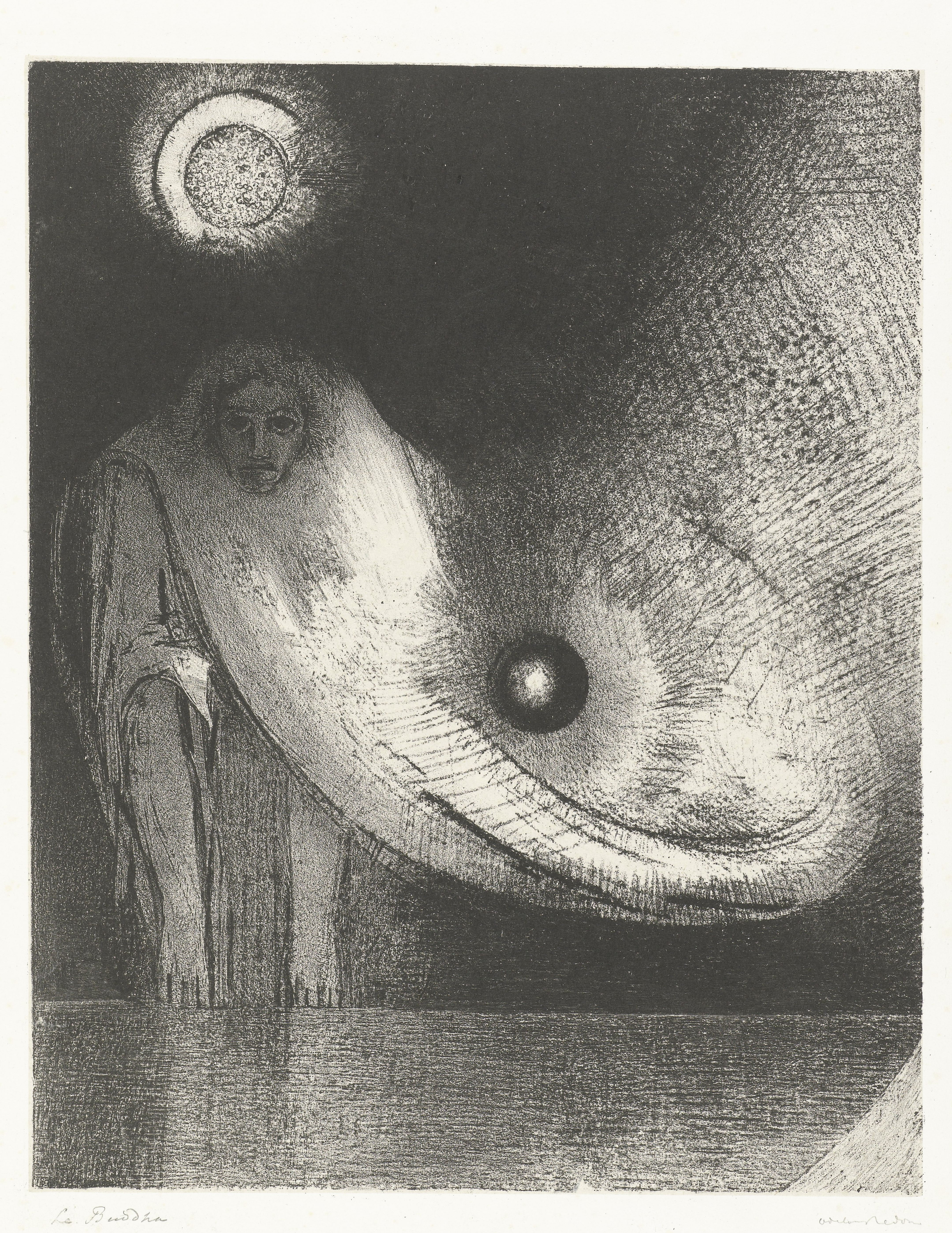
Odilon Redon, Buddha, chine collé lithograph, 1895

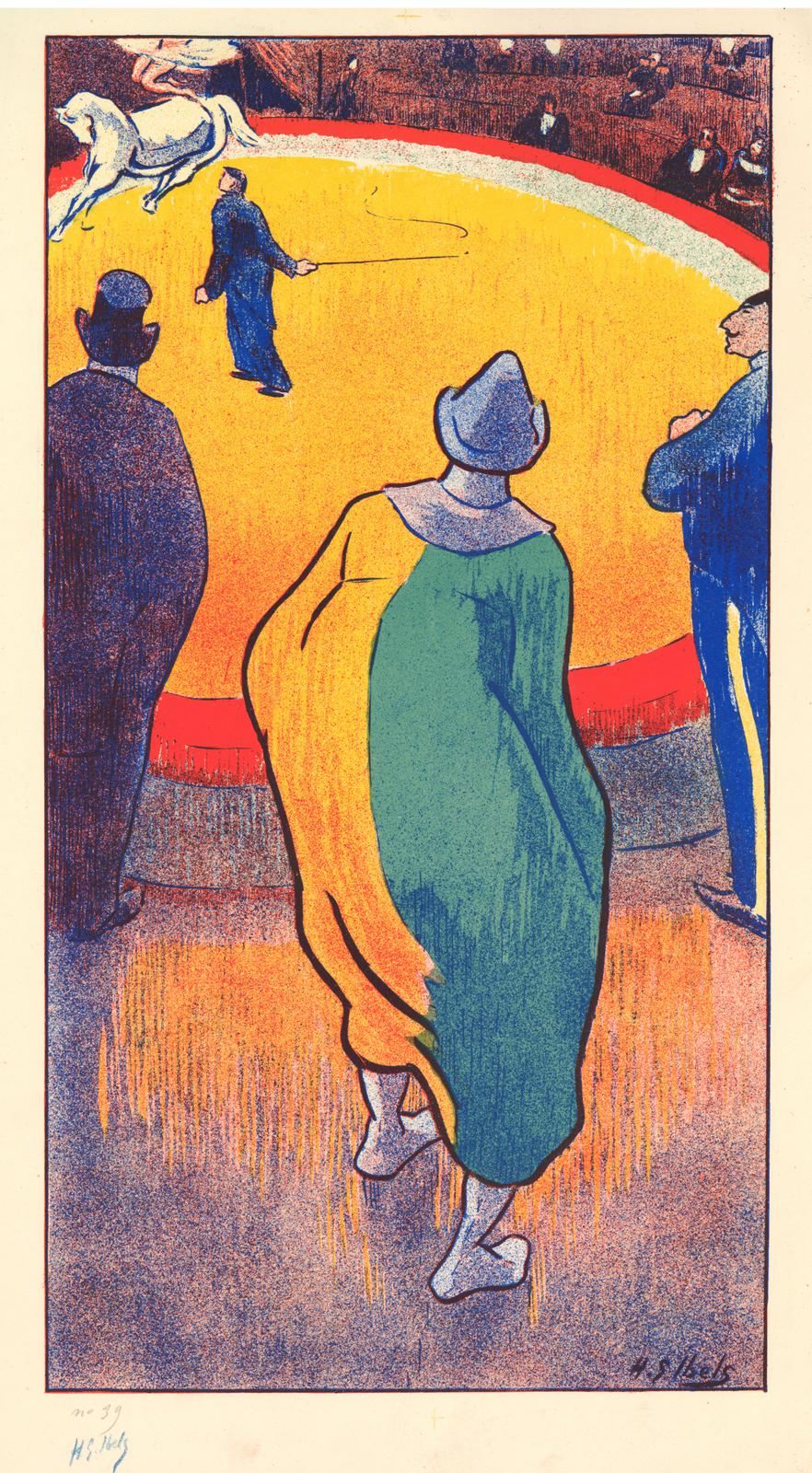
Au Cirque, Henri-Gabriel Ibels, 1893, 4-colour lithograph, 59.3 x 42.1 cm

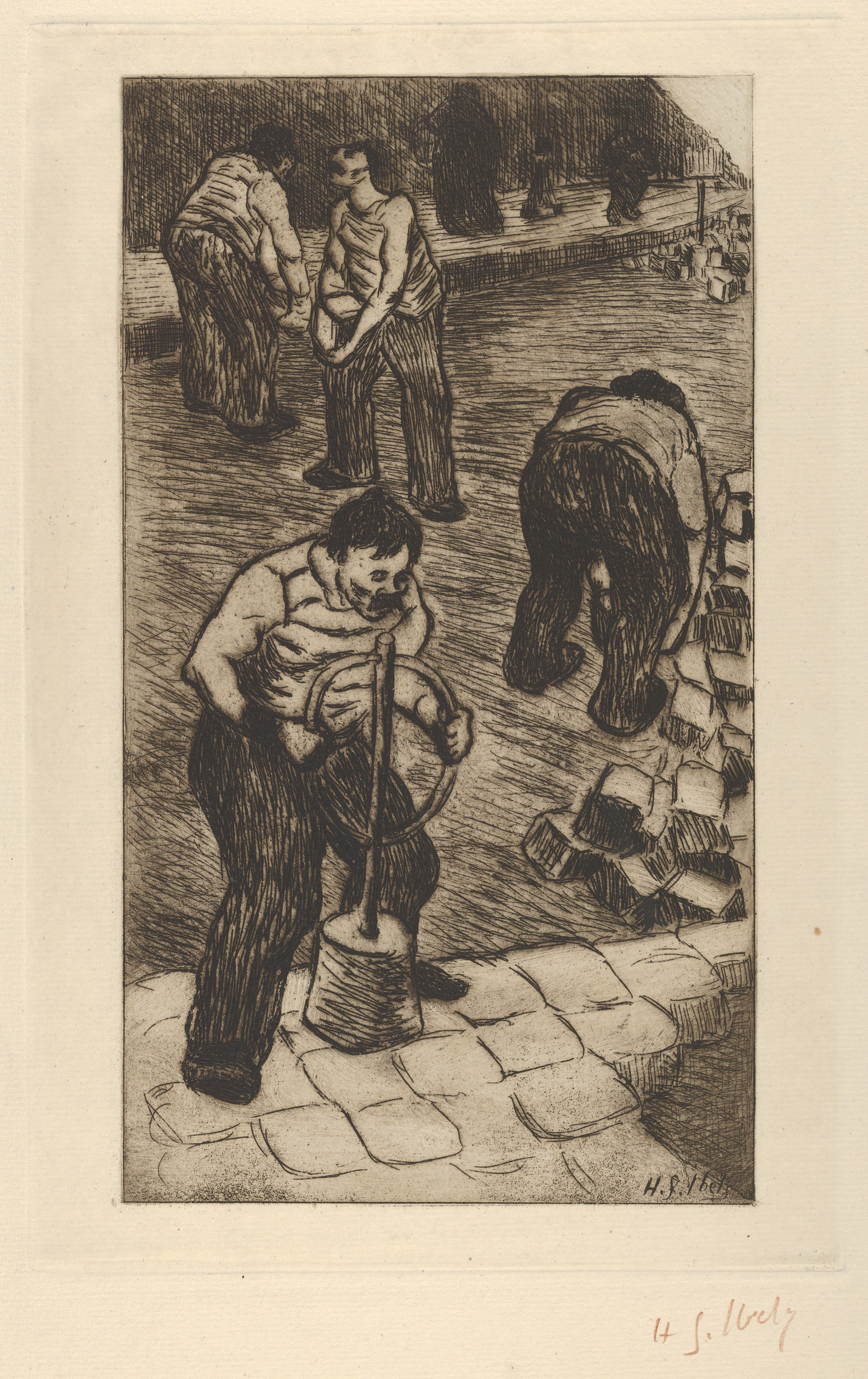
Henri-Gabriel Ibels, Street Pavers (Les Paveurs), 1894, etching with surface tone
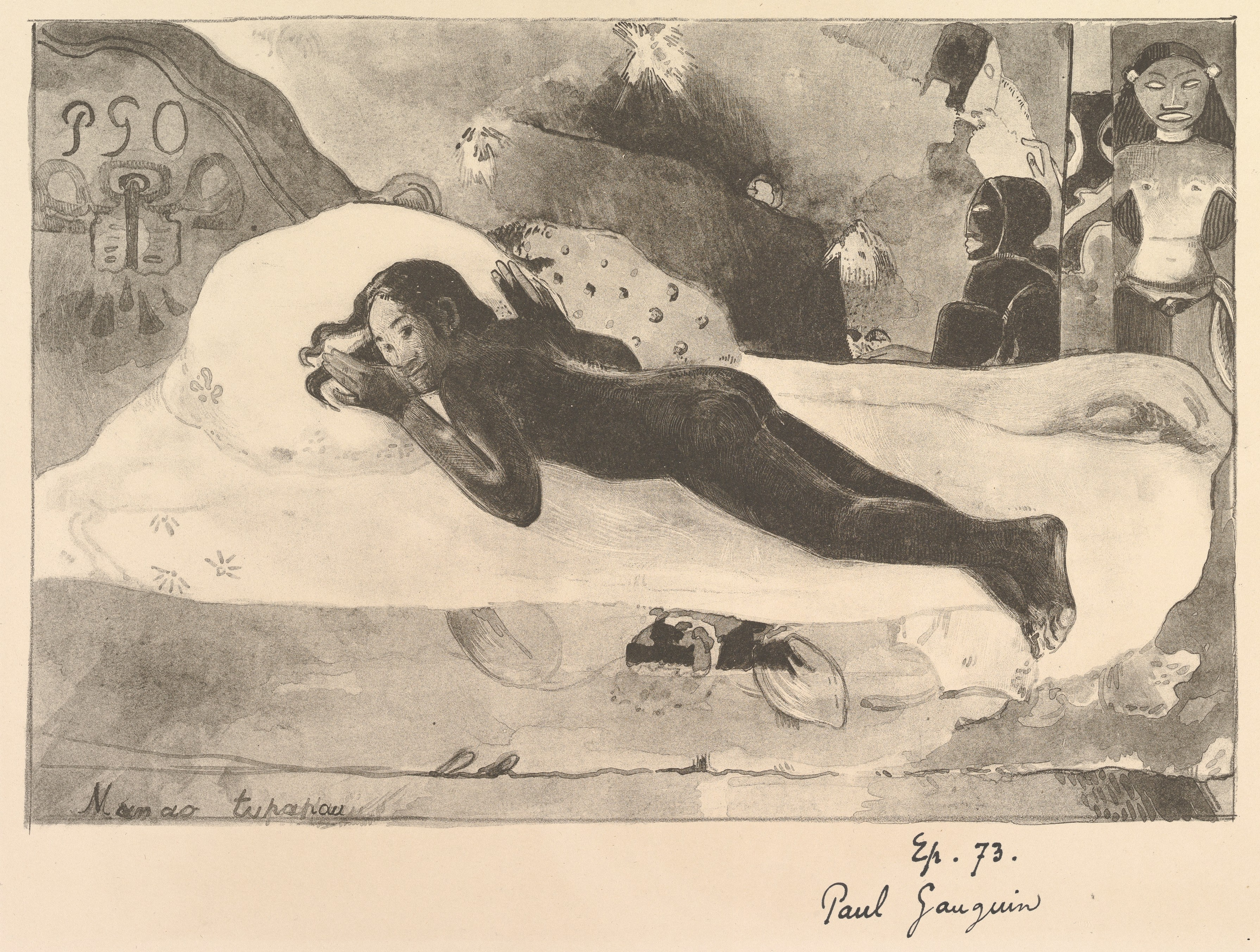
Paul Gauguin, Spirit of the Dead Watching ("Manao Tupapau"), 1894, lithograph

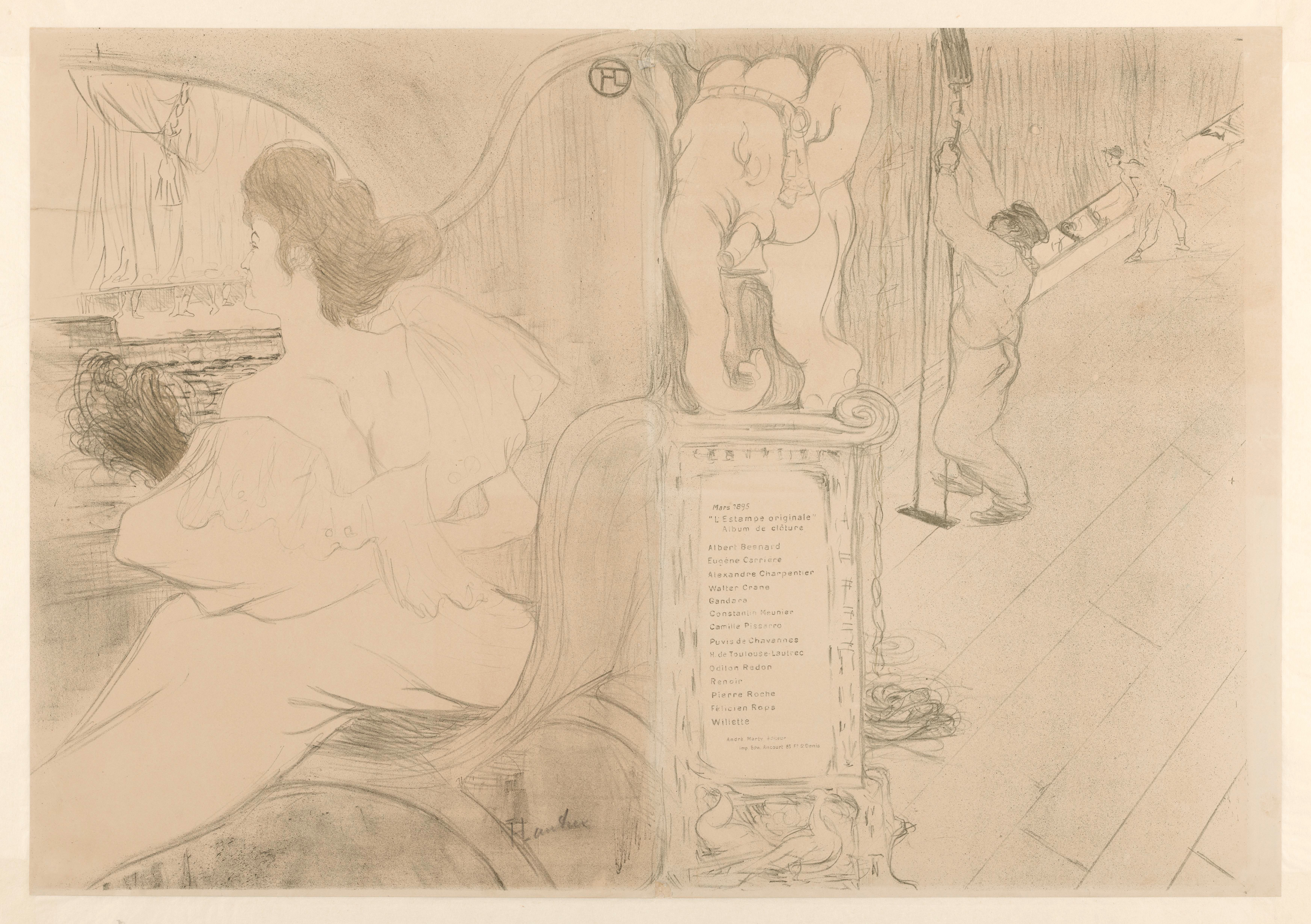
Henri de Toulouse-Lautrec, cover for the Album de clôture, 1895, lithograph

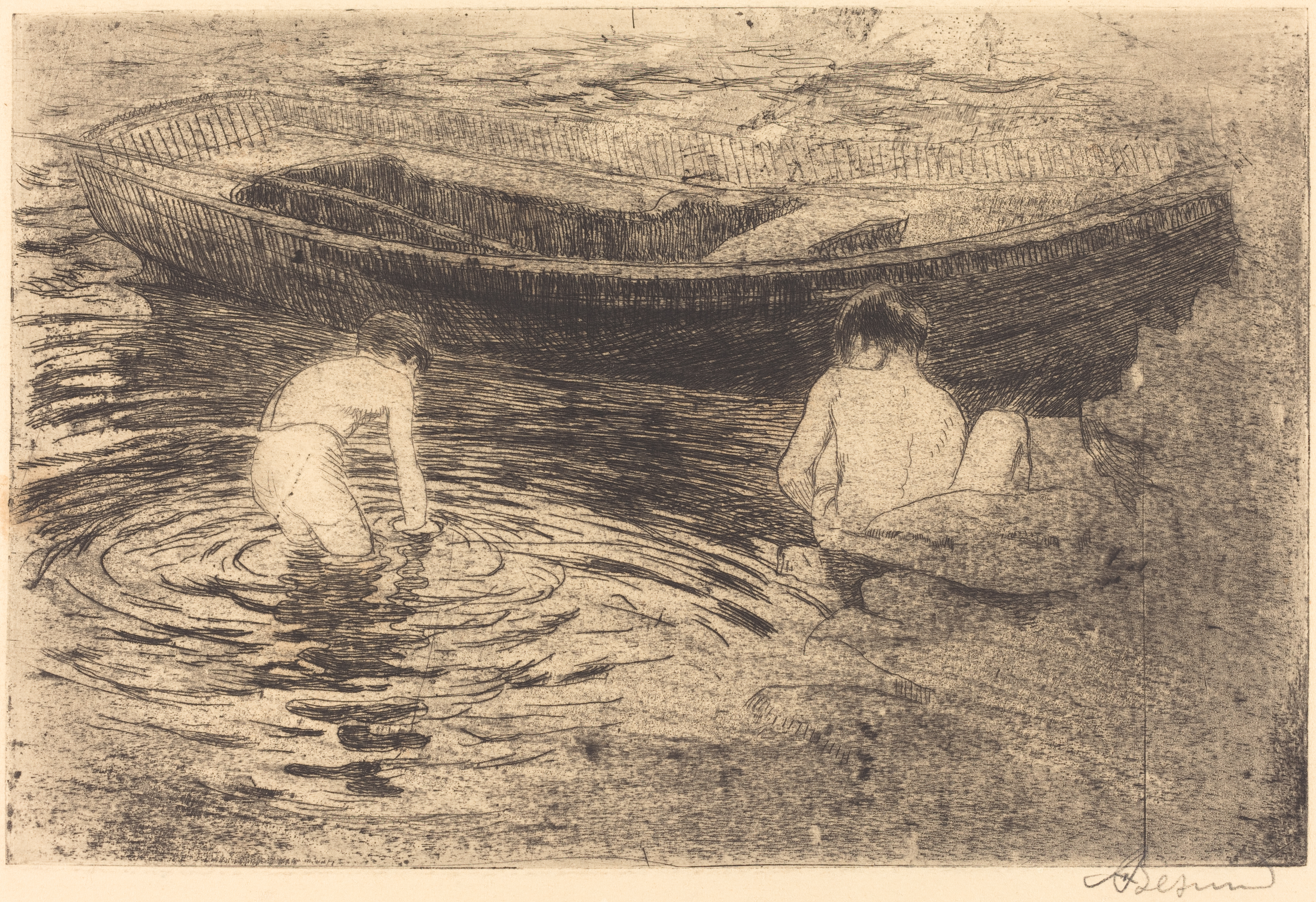
Albert Besnard, Bathing at Talloires (La baignade à Talloires), etching and aquatint, 1888/1894

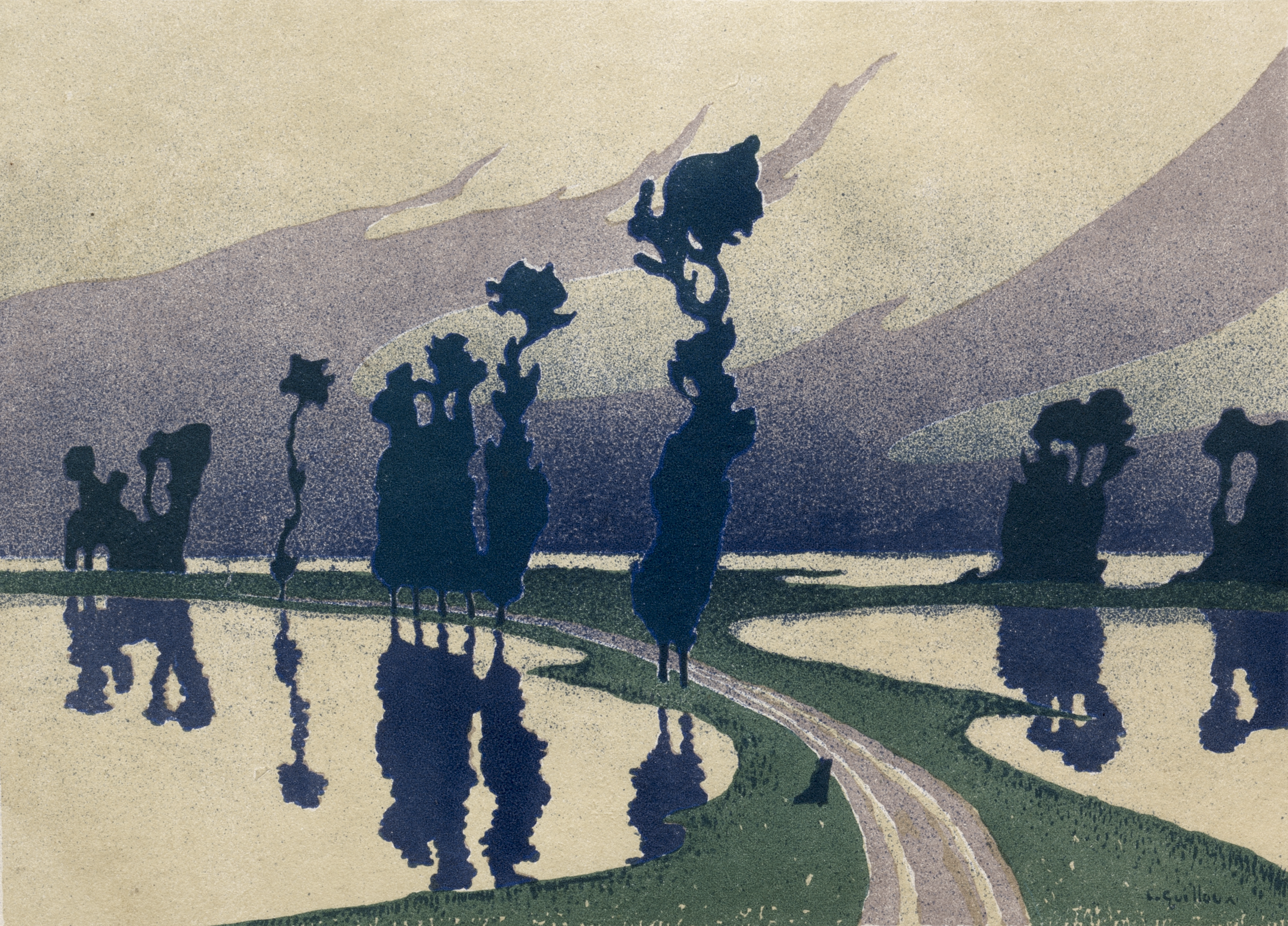
Charles Guilloux, The Deluge (L'Inondation), 1893, colour lithograph
