= Etching revival =

Art movement between 1850s and c. 1930

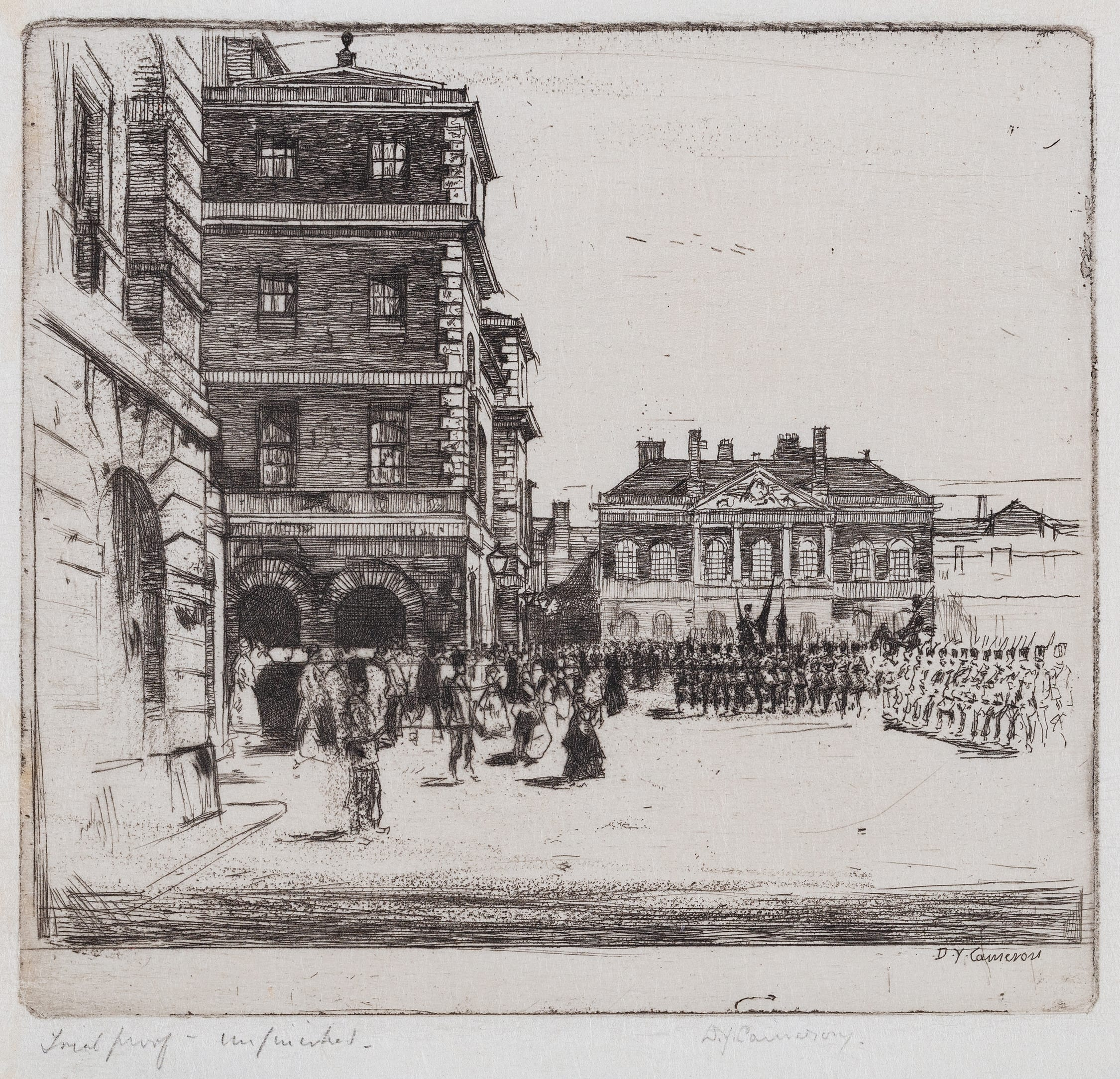
David Young Cameron, Horse Guards, St James's Park, signed and inscribed "Trial Proof – unfinished"

The etching revival was the re-emergence and invigoration of etching as an original form of printmaking during the period approximately from 1850 to 1930. The main centres were France, Britain and the United States, but other countries, such as the Netherlands, also participated. A strong collector's market developed, with the most sought-after artists achieving very high prices. This came to an abrupt end after the 1929 Wall Street crash wrecked what had become a very strong market among collectors, at a time when the typical style of the movement, still based on 19th-century developments, was becoming outdated.

According to Bamber Gascoigne, the "most visible characteristic of [the movement]... was an obsession with surface tone", created by deliberately not wiping all the ink off the surface of the printing plate, so that parts of the image have a light tone from the film of ink left. This and other characteristics reflected the influence of Rembrandt, whose reputation had by this point reached its full height.

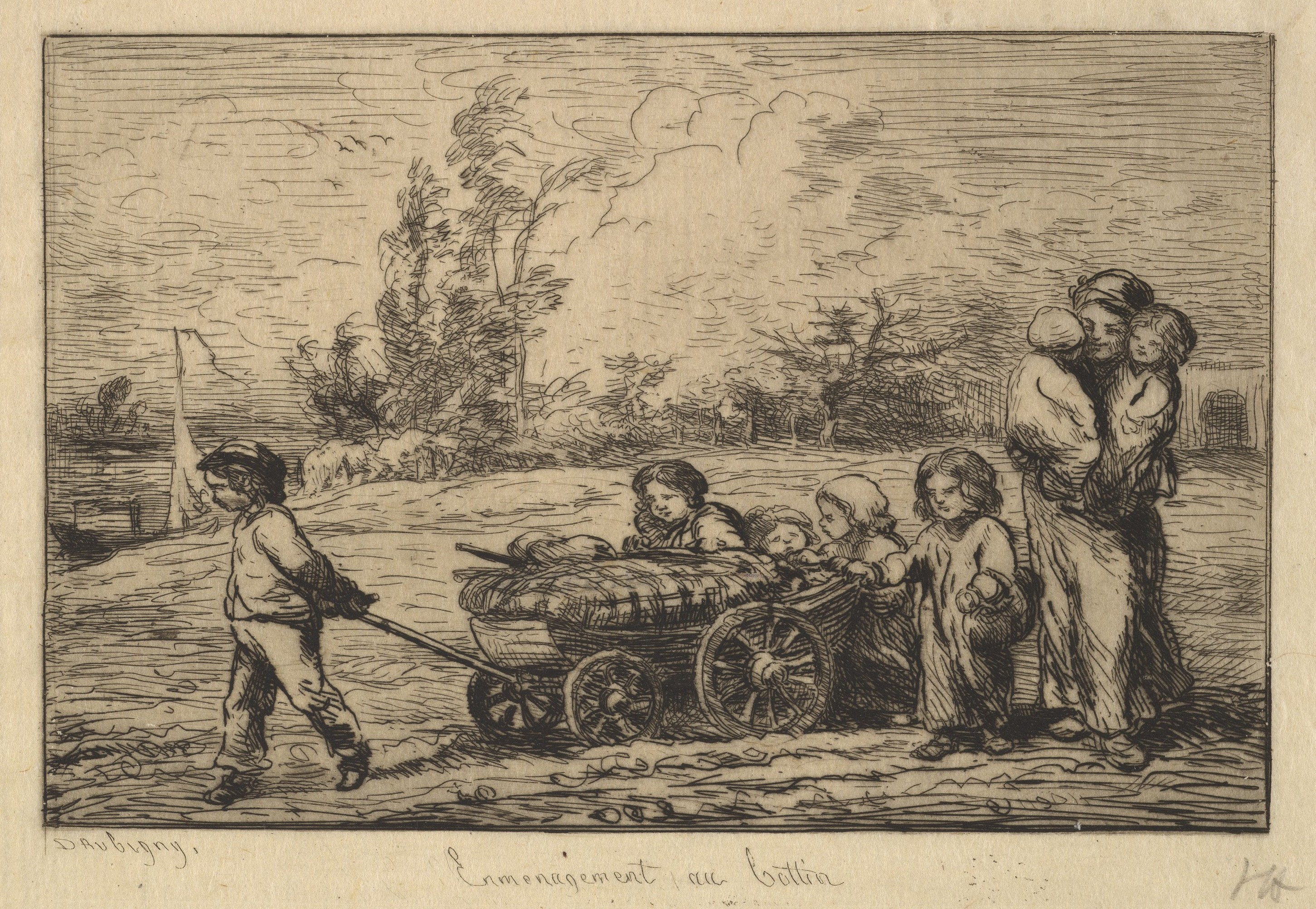
Charles-François Daubigny, Moving into the Boat, 1861

Although some artists owned their own printing presses, the movement created the new figure of the star printer, who worked closely with artists to exploit all the possibilities of the etching technique, with variable inking, surface tone and retroussage, and the use of different papers. Societies and magazines were also important, publishing albums of varied original prints by different artists in fixed editions.

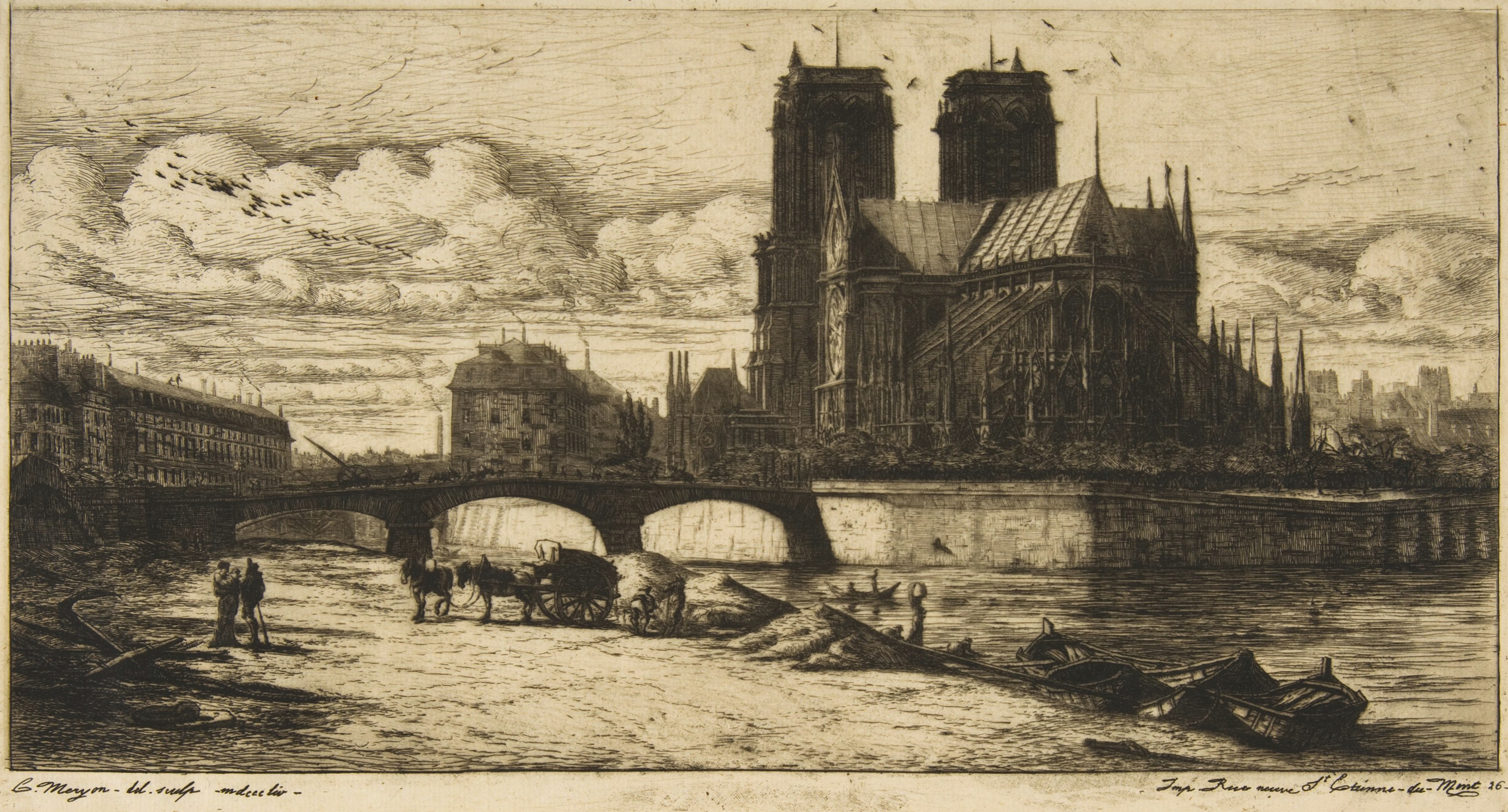
Charles Meryon, Abside de Notre Dame, 1854, fourth state of nine.

The most common subjects were landscapes and townscapes, portraits, and genre scenes of ordinary people. The mythological and historical subjects still very prominent in contemporary painting rarely feature. Etching was the dominant technique, but many plates combined this with drypoint in particular; the basic action of creating the lines on the plate for these was essentially the same as in drawing, and fairly easy for a trained artist to pick up. Sometimes other intaglio printmaking techniques were used: engraving, mezzotint and aquatint, all of which used more specialized actions on the plate. Artists then had to learn the mysteries of "biting" the plate with acid; this was not needed with pure drypoint, which was one of its attractions.

== Historical outline ==
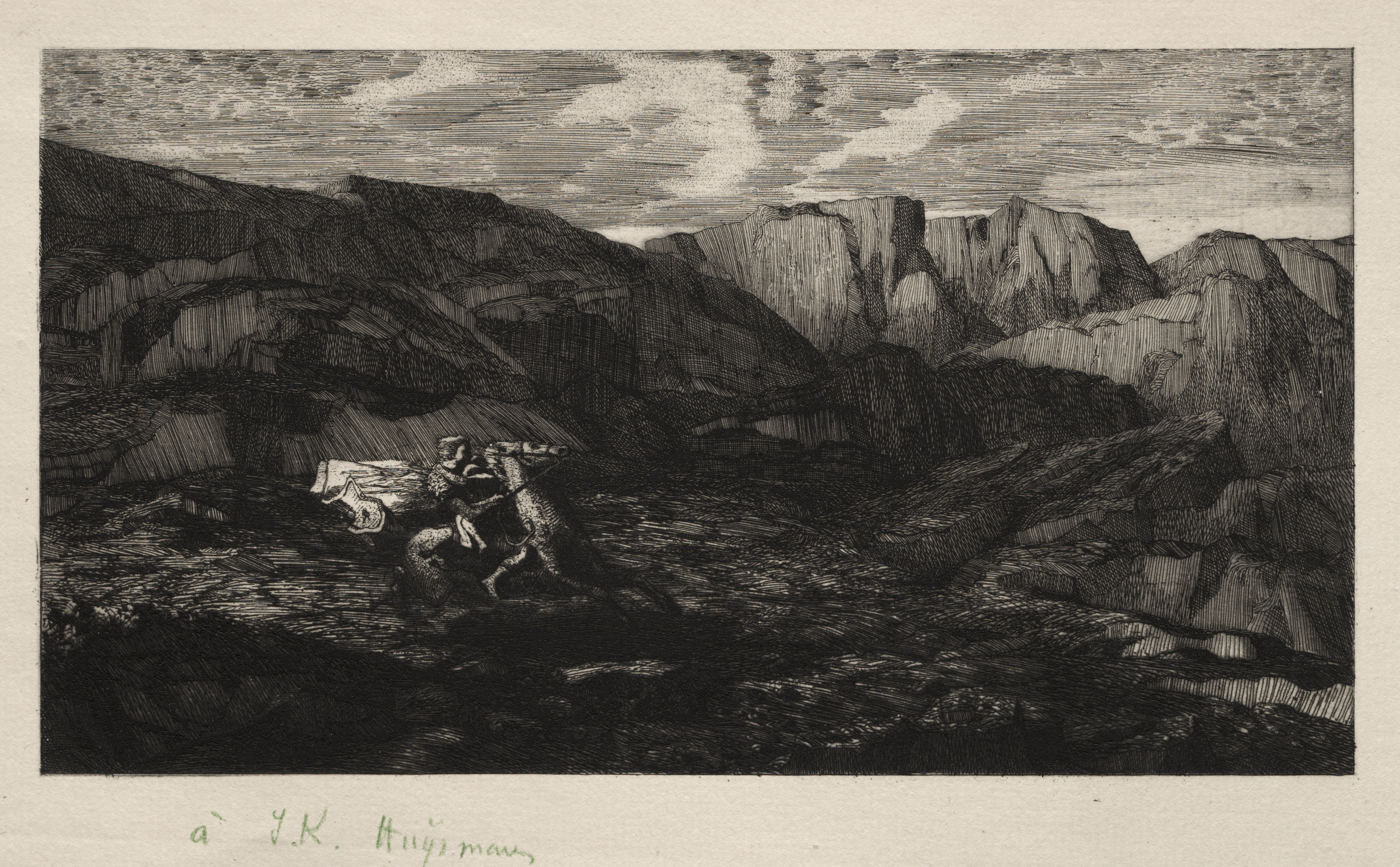
Fear (La peur) by Odilon Redon, an early etching of 1866.

During the century after Rembrandt's death the techniques of etching and drypoint brought to their highest point by him gradually declined. By the late eighteenth century, with brilliant exceptions like Piranesi, Tiepolo and Goya most etchings were reproductive or illustrative. In England the situation was slightly better, with Samuel Palmer, John Sell Cotman, John Crome and others producing fine original etchings, mostly of landscape subjects, in the early decades of the 19th century. The Etching Club, founded in 1838, continued to maintain the medium, among other things publishing small editions of classic works of English literature illustrated with original etchings by groups of its members.

As the century progressed, new technical developments, especially lithography, which was gradually able to print successfully in colour, further depressed the use of etching. The style typical of the Etching Revival really begins in France with the prints of the Barbizon School in the 1840s and 50s. A number of artists, mainly painters, produced some landscape etchings which seemed to recapture some of the spirit of the Old Master print. Charles-François Daubigny, Millet and especially Charles Jacque produced etchings that were different from those heavily worked reproductive plates of the previous century. The dark, grand and often vertical format townscapes of Charles Meryon, also mostly from the 1850s, provided models for a very different type of subject and style which was to remain in use until the end of the revival, though more in Britain than France.

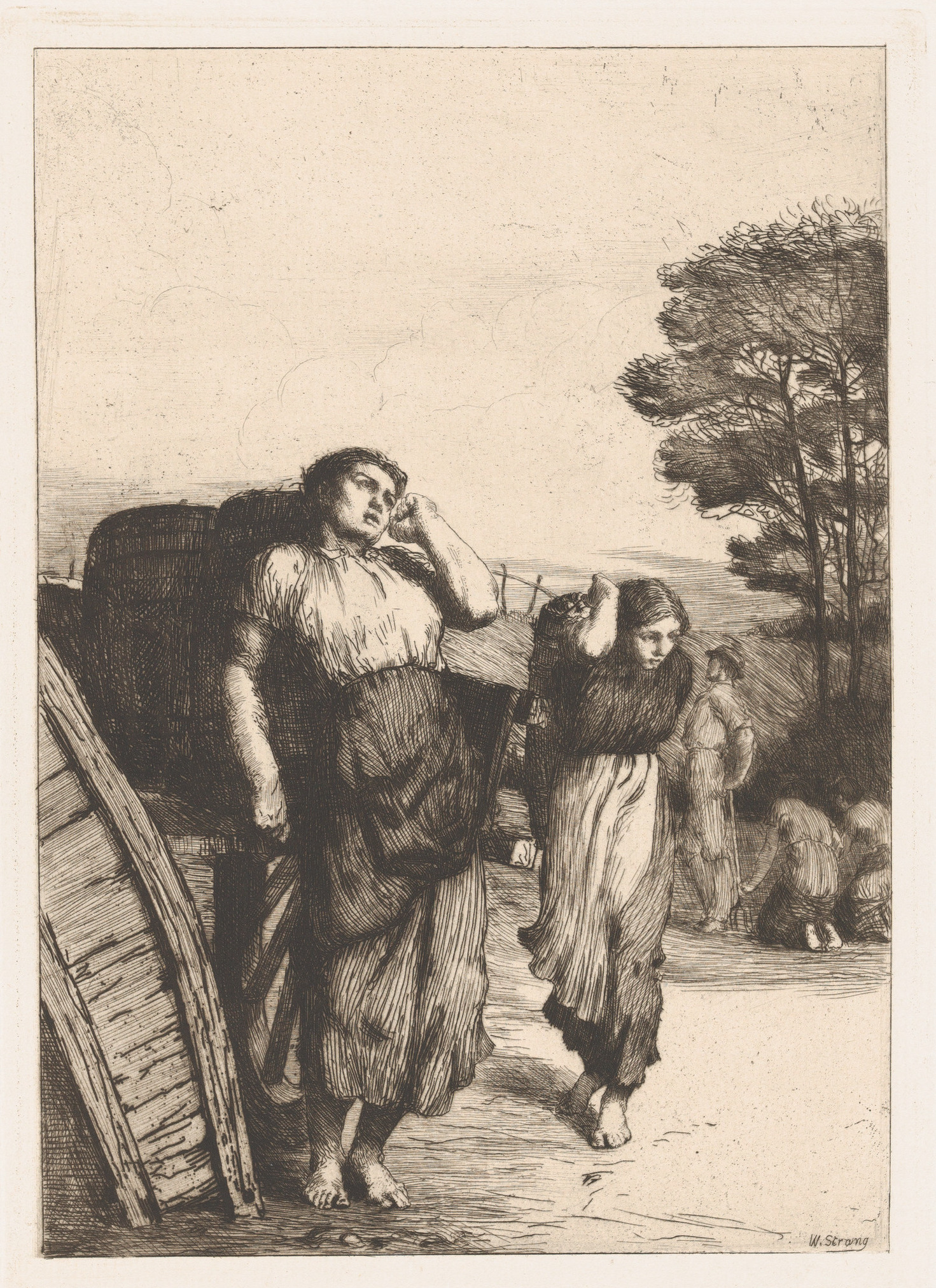
William Strang, 1882, Potato Lifting, published in The Portfolio.

The steel-facing of plates was a technical development patented in 1857 which "immediately revolutionized the print business." It allowed a very thin coating of iron to be added to a copper plate by electroplating. This made the lines on the plates much more durable, and in particular the fragile "burr" thrown up by the drypoint process lasted much better than with copper alone, and so a greater (if still small) number of rich, burred, impressions could be produced. Francis Seymour Haden and his brother-in-law, the American James McNeill Whistler were among the first to exploit this, and drypoint became a more popular technique than it had been since the 15th century, still often combined with conventional etching. However, steel-facing could lead to a loss of quality. It is not to be confused with steel engraving on wholly iron plates, popular in the same period but almost always for mezzotints and commercial printing.

Several people were of special importance to the French Etching Revival. The publisher Alfred Cadart, the printer Auguste Delâtre, and Maxime Lalanne, an etcher who wrote a popular textbook of etching in 1866, established the broad contours of the movement. Cadart founded the Société des Aquafortistes in 1862, reviving the awareness of the beautiful, original etching in the minds of the collecting public. Charles Meryon was an early inspiration, and close collaborator with Delâtre, laying out the various possible techniques of modern etching and producing works that would be ranked with Rembrandt and Dürer.

For Hamerton and others, the father of the British Etching Revival was Francis Seymour Haden, the surgeon etcher, who, with his brother-in-law, the American, James McNeill Whistler, produced a body of work starting around 1860 that still stands as one of the highpoints of etching history. Haden was a collector and authority on the etchings of Rembrandt and it comes as no surprise that as Whistler, the younger man, began to show signs of veering far from the 17th-century model, Haden and he parted company. Figures from other countries included Edvard Munch in Norway, Anders Zorn in Sweden, and Käthe Kollwitz in Germany.

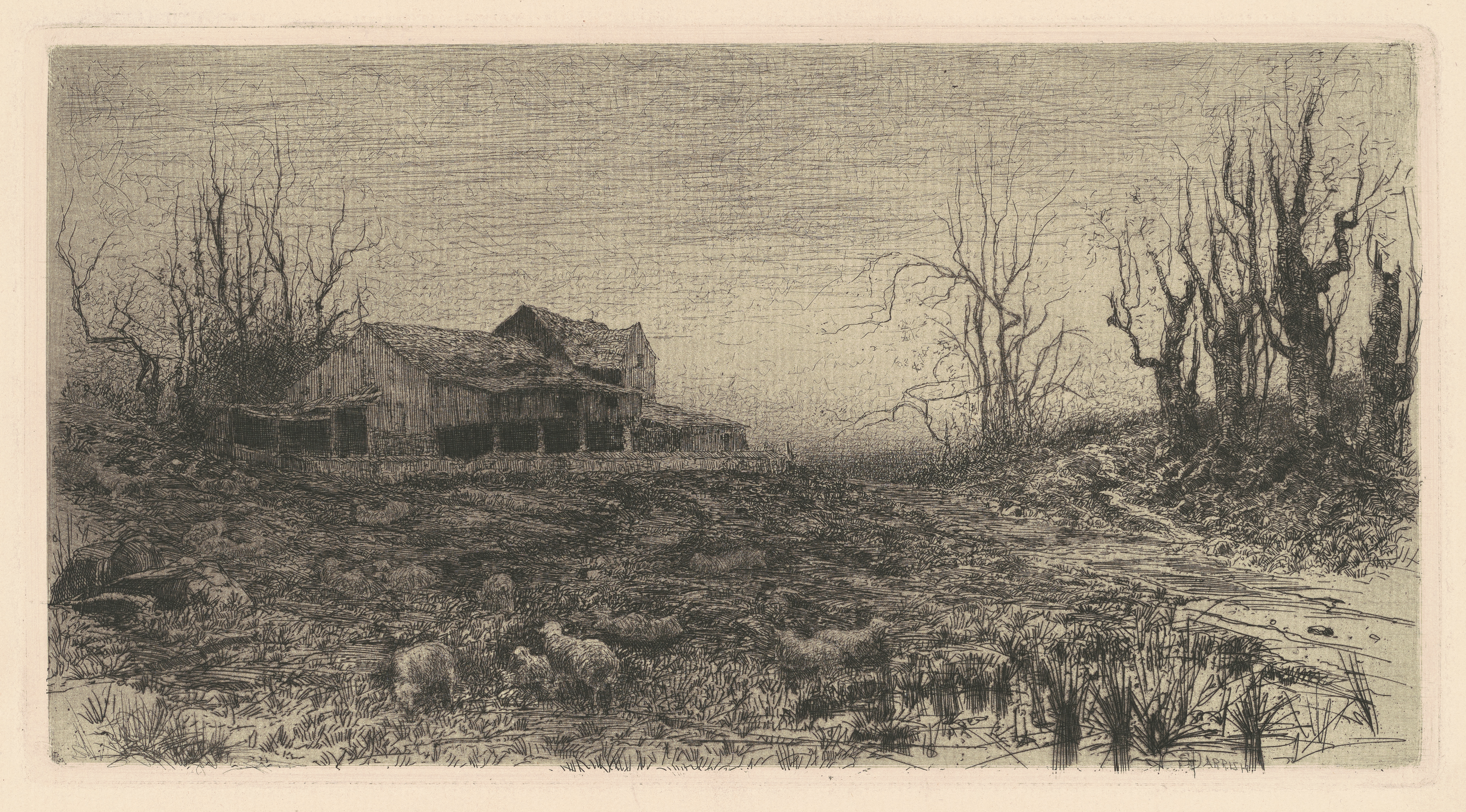
Stephen Parrish, November, etching, 1880

It was Whistler who convinced the artist Alphonse Legros, one of the members of the French Revival, to come to London in 1863; later he was a professor at the Slade School of Fine Art. This linking of the art of the two countries, though short-lived, did much to validate etching as an art form. Very soon, French etching would show the same modernist signs that French art showed generally, while English and American etching remained true to the kind of technical proficiency and subject matter artists revered in Rembrandt. One distinct aspect of the revival, in contrast with the Old Master period, was an interest in giving unique qualities to each impression of a print.

Artists who only or mainly made prints, and usually drawings, were few. Meryon, who was colourblind and so effectively prevented from painting, is probably the most significant. Haden, who was strictly speaking an amateur, is another. Most artists continued to work in paint, but while some are now mainly remembered for their prints (Félix Bracquemond, Bone and Cameron for example), others achieved fame in the more prestigious medium of paint, and it tends to be forgotten that they were printmakers at all. Degas, Manet and Picasso are examples of this; Whistler perhaps remains known for both.

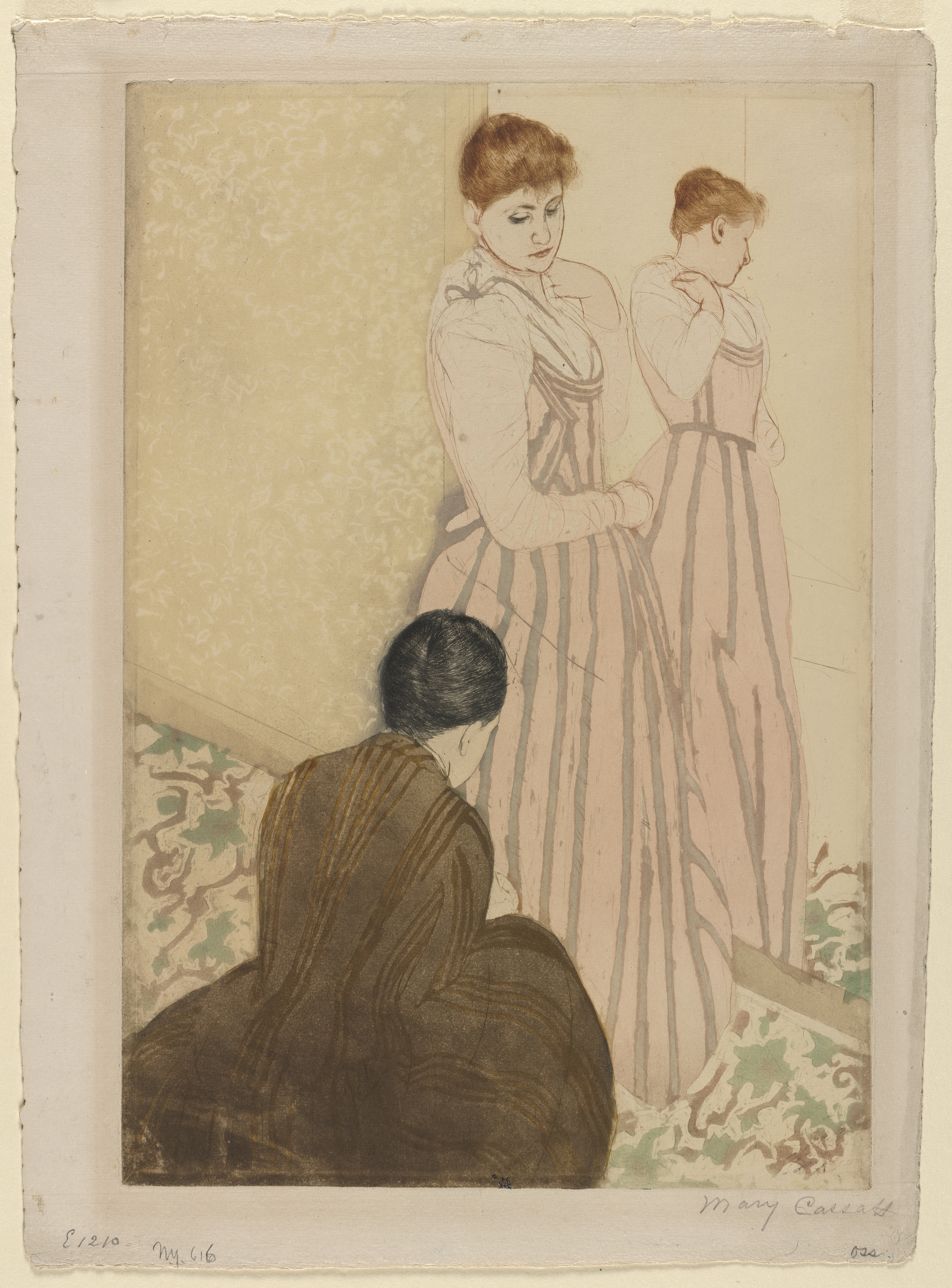
Mary Cassatt, The Fitting, 1890, drypoint and aquatint, inked à la poupée by the artist herself, inspired by Japanese ukiyo-e.

Although the theorists of the movement tended to concentrate on monochrome prints in the traditional techniques of etching, drypoint, and some mezzotint, and the term "etching revival" (and so this article) is mainly concerned with works in these, many artists also used other techniques, especially outside Britain. The French, and later the Americans, were very interested in making lithographs, and in the long run this emerged as the dominant artistic printmaking technique, especially in the next century after the possibilities for using colour became greatly improved. The same artists of the Barbizon school who etched were the main users of the semiphotographic etching-like technique of the cliché verre, between the 1850s and 1870s.

The fashion for Japonisme from the 1870s gave a particular spur to the movement towards colour, as brightly coloured Japanese ukiyo-e woodblock prints began to be seen and admired in Europe. The situation was reversed in Japan compared to Europe, with multi-coloured prints but a still strong tradition of monochrome ink and wash paintings, few of which were seen in Europe. Many printmakers tried their own methods of achieving similar effects, with Mary Cassatt's very complicated prints, including à la poupée inking, among the most effective. The Japanese printmakers used multiple woodblocks, one for each colour, and there was something of a revival in woodcut, which hardly any serious artists had worked in since the 16th century.

Though the styles and techniques typical of the revival fell out of fashion after about 1930, the interest in artistic printmaking has endured, and significant artists still very often produce prints, generally using the signed limited edition presentation that the revival pioneered. Though lithographs are generally more common, an outstanding set using traditional etching is the Vollard Suite of 100 etchings by Pablo Picasso, "undoubtedly the greatest etcher of [the 20th] century", produced from 1930 to 1937 and named after Ambroise Vollard (1866-1939), the art dealer who commissioned them.

=== Later artists ===
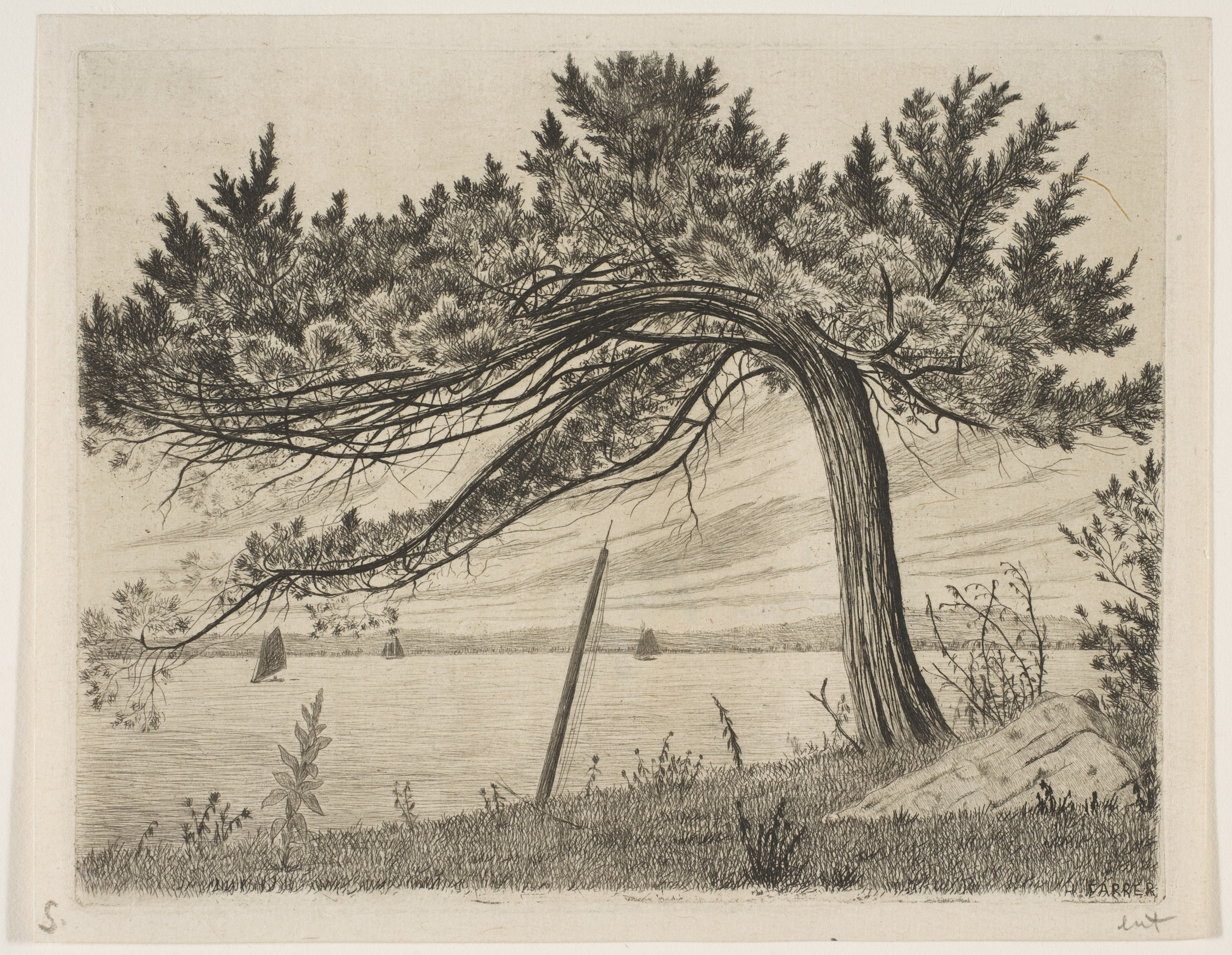
Henry Farrer, Pelham Bay, c. 1875

In France the 1890s saw another wave of productivity in printmaking, with a great diversity of techniques, subjects, and styles. The album-periodical L'Estampe originale (not to be confused with the similar L'Estampe Moderne of 1897–1899, which was all lithographs, leaning more to Art Nouveau) produced nine issues quarterly between 1893 and 1895, containing a total of 95 original prints by a very distinguished group of 74 artists. Of these prints, 60 were lithographs, 26 in the various intaglio techniques (with a third of these using colour), 7 woodcuts, a wood engraving and a gypsograph.

The subjects have a notably large number of figures compared to earlier decades, and the artists include Whistler, Toulouse-Lautrec, Gauguin, Renoir, Pissarro, Paul Signac, Odilon Redon, Rodin, Henri Fantin-Latour, Félicien Rops and Puvis de Chavannes. Almost all of Les Nabis contributed: Pierre Bonnard, Maurice Denis, Paul Ranson, Édouard Vuillard, Ker-Xavier Roussel, Félix Vallotton, and Paul Sérusier. British artists included William Nicholson, Charles Ricketts, Walter Crane and William Rothenstein, and besides Whistler Joseph Pennell was American.

In Britain a later generation included three artists working very largely in etching who were knighted. These were the "high priests" of the English movement: Muirhead Bone, David Young Cameron (these two both born and trained in Glasgow), and Frank Short. Like others, they "treated a narrow range of subjects with a dour earnestness", according to Antony Griffiths. Myra Kathleen Hughes and William Strang were other leading figures. Many artists turned to illustrating books, usually with lithographs. In America, Stephen Parrish, Otto Bacher, Henry Farrer, and Robert Swain Gifford might be considered the important figures at the turn of the century, though they were mostly less exclusively dedicated to printmaking than the English artists. The New York Etching Club was the main professional etching organization. Earlier, one portfolio published in 1883, Original Etchings by American Artists, included works by Thomas Moran, Mary Nimmo Moran, Stephen Parrish, Henry Farrer, Robert Swain Gifford, and Hendrik Dirk Kruseman van Elten.

The final generation of the revival are too numerous to name here but they might include such names as Frederick Griggs, Malcolm Osborne, James McBey, Ian Strang (son of William), and Edmund Blampied in Britain, John Sloan, Martin Lewis, Joseph Pennell and John Taylor Arms in the United States. Griggs' pupil Joseph Webb only began etching in the last years before the collapse of the price bubble, and persisted in etching "Romantic pastoral landscapes" into the late 1940s. William Walcot, formerly an architect in Russia, etched architectural subjects, including recreations of grand buildings from antiquity.

== Books, critics and theory ==
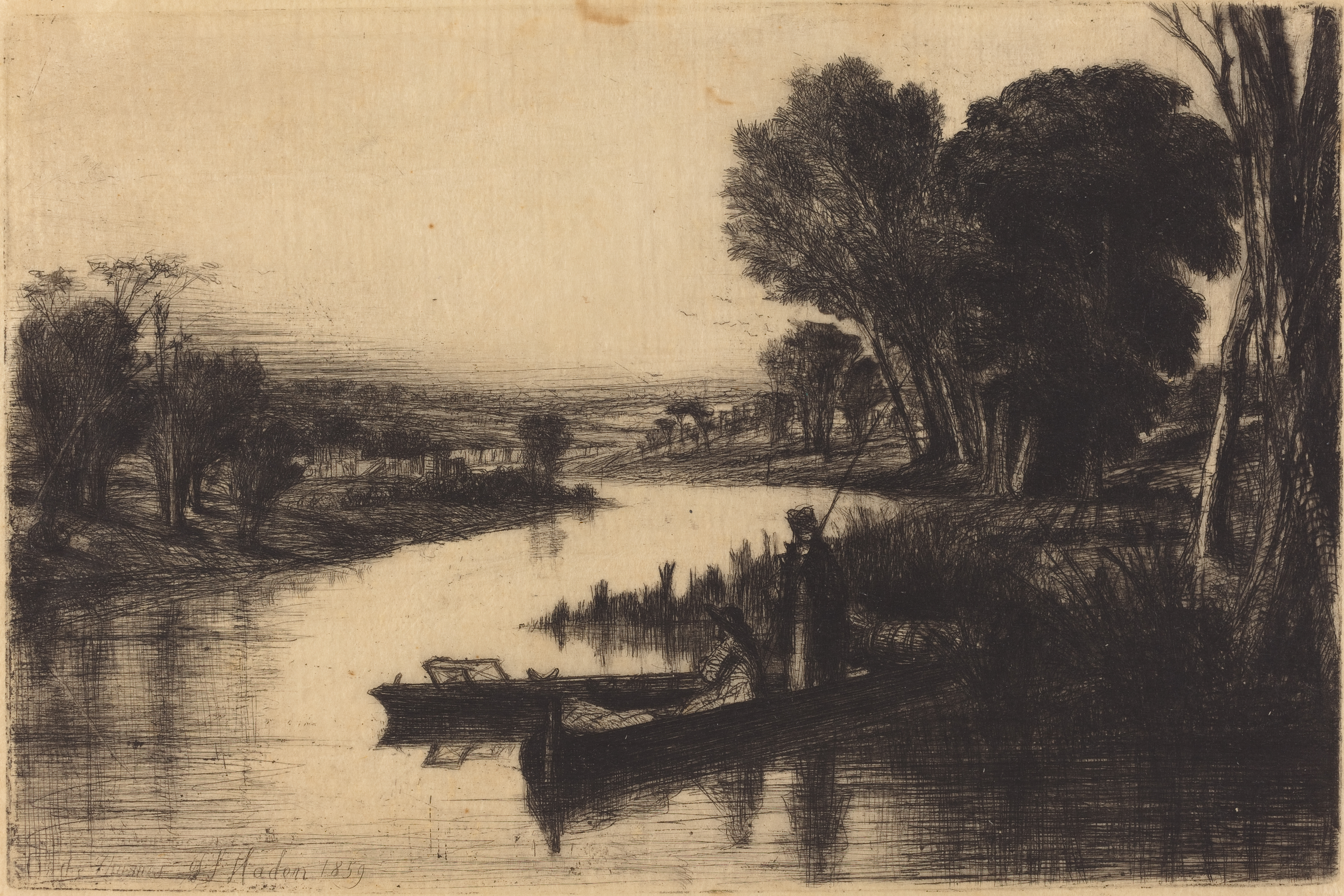
Francis Seymour Haden, Thames Fishermen, drypoint with etching, 1859

The revival attracted some hostile criticism. John Ruskin (despite having practised it to illustrate some of his books) described etching in 1872 as "an indolent and blundering art", objecting to both the reliance on chemical processes and mostly skilled printers to achieve the final image, and the perceived ease of the artist's role in creating it. In France the poet Charles Baudelaire was very supportive of Meryon and other specific French professionals, and admired Haden and Whistler. But writing in 1862 he was hostile, for similar reasons to Ruskin, to what he saw as the English phenomenon of an etching craze among amateurs (like Haden) and even ladies, hoping it would never in France "win as great a popularity as it did in London in the heyday of the Etching Club, when even fair "ladies" prided themselves on their ability to run an inexperienced needle over the varnish plate. A typically British craze, a passing mania which would bode ill for us".

To counter such criticisms, members of the movement wrote not only to explain the refinements of the technical processes, but to exalt original (rather than merely reproductive) etchings as creative works, with their own disciplines and artistic requirements. Haden's About Etching (1866) was an important early work, promoting a particular view of etching, especially applicable to landscapes, as effectively an extension of drawing, with its possibilities for spontaneity and revealing the creative processes of the artist in a way that became lost in a highly finished and reworked oil painting.

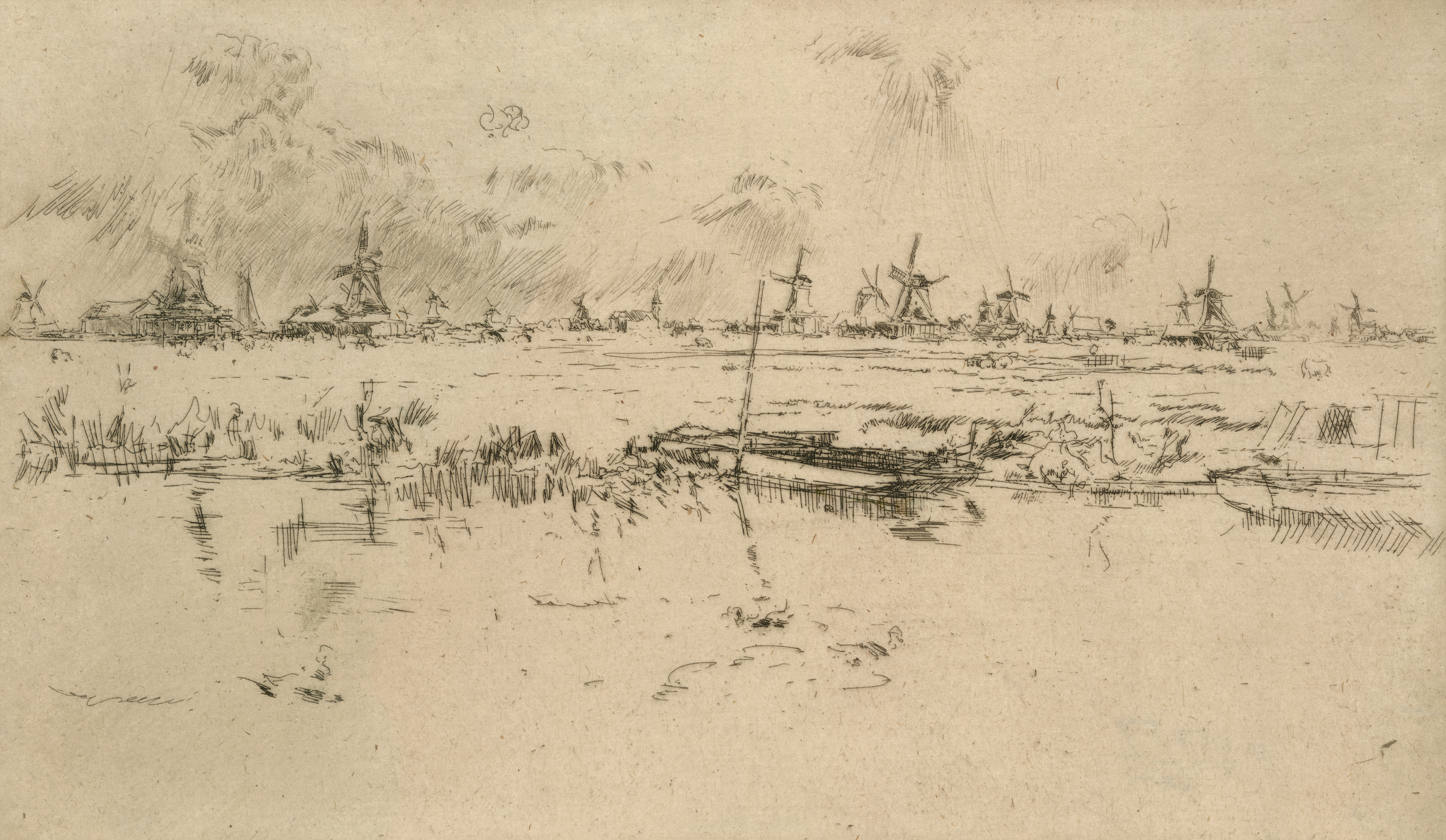
Zaandam by James McNeill Whistler, c.1889, exemplifying Haden's idea of "learned omission".

Oil painting was soon to come up with developments (notably Impressionism) to overcome these limitations, but Haden's rhetoric was effective and influential. He advocated a style of "learned omission", according to which the fewer lines there were on a plate, "the greater would be the thought and creativity residing in each line". In accordance with this, Haden (like Meryon) disliked the addition of surface tone during printing, and fell out with Whistler over this and similar issues. Haden wrote: "I insist on a rapid execution, which pays little attention to detail", and thought that ideally the plate should be drawn in a single day's work, and bitten in front of the subject, or at least soon enough after seeing it to retain a good visual memory. Haden had devised his own novel technique where the etching was drawn on the plate while it was immersed in a weak acid bath, so that the earliest lines were bitten the deepest; normally the drawing and biting were performed as different stages.

In France Haden's ideas reflected a debate that had been underway for some decades over the comparative merits of quickly executed works such as the oil sketch, and the much lengthier process of making a finished painting. The critic Philippe Burty, in general a supporter of both Haden and etching in general, nonetheless criticized his views on the primacy of quickly executing works, pointing to the number of states in Haden's own prints as showing that Haden did not entirely follow his own precepts. In the mid-1860s Haden argued against Ruskin's sometimes violently expressed objections to etching; what Haden saw as etching's strength, the ease of transmitting the thought of the artist, was exactly what Ruskin deplored: "in the etching needle you have an almost irresistible temptation to a wanton speed".

Philip Gilbert Hamerton had become an enthusiastic promoter of etching in Britain. He had trained as a painter, but become a professional art critic and amateur etcher. His Etching and Etchers (1868) was more an art history than a technical text but it did much to popularize the art and some of its modern practitioners. His ideas had much in common with those of Haden, favouring a spare style where what was omitted was as important as what was included, an important theme of Haden. The book went through many editions till the 20th century. By the 1870s Hamerton was also publishing an influential periodical, titled The Portfolio, that published etchings in editions of 1000 copies. The French A Treatise on Etching by Lalanne was translated by S.R. Koehler and published in the United States in 1880. It played a significant role in the Etching Revival in America.

== Boom and bust ==
The etching revival relied on a well-developed art trade, with galleries, dealers, clubs, and at the top end auction houses. This was in place by 1850 in London, Paris and other major centres, and continued to expand greatly in Europe and America. Prints had the additional and unique option of the magazine "album"; this was even more useful for lithographs, which could be reliably printed in larger numbers, but also very useful for the traditional monochrome techniques, once steel-faced plates were in use. This art trade fed both the traditional collectors market of the well-off, who kept most of their prints in portfolios, but also a larger and rapidly expanding middle-class market, who mainly wanted a certain number of images to frame and display in their homes, and now wanted original works rather than, or as well as, reproductive ones (the reproductive print meanwhile enjoying a huge boom by expanding its market to lower middle-class and working-class groups).

By the early 20th century, and especially in the decade after the end of the First World War, a very strong body of well-off collectors led to a huge boom in prices for contemporary prints by the most highly regarded artists, sometimes called the "super-etchers", which very often exceeded those for good impressions of prints by Rembrandt and Dürer, let alone other Old Masters. The boom was somewhat cynically exploited by many artists, who produced prints in a rather excessive number of states, often described as "proof states", so encouraging collectors to buy multiple copies. Muirhead Bone is believed to hold the record, with 28 states for one print. Surface tone also individualized impressions.

More usefully, the enduring habit of numbering and signing prints as limited editions began at this period. This does certify authenticity and reflect the limited number of top quality impressions that can be taken from an intaglio plate before it begins to show wear. Today it is used for marketing reasons even for prints such as lithographs, where such a limit barely applies. Whistler began charging twice as much for signed impressions as for unsigned ones; this was for a series in 1887, in fact of lithographs.

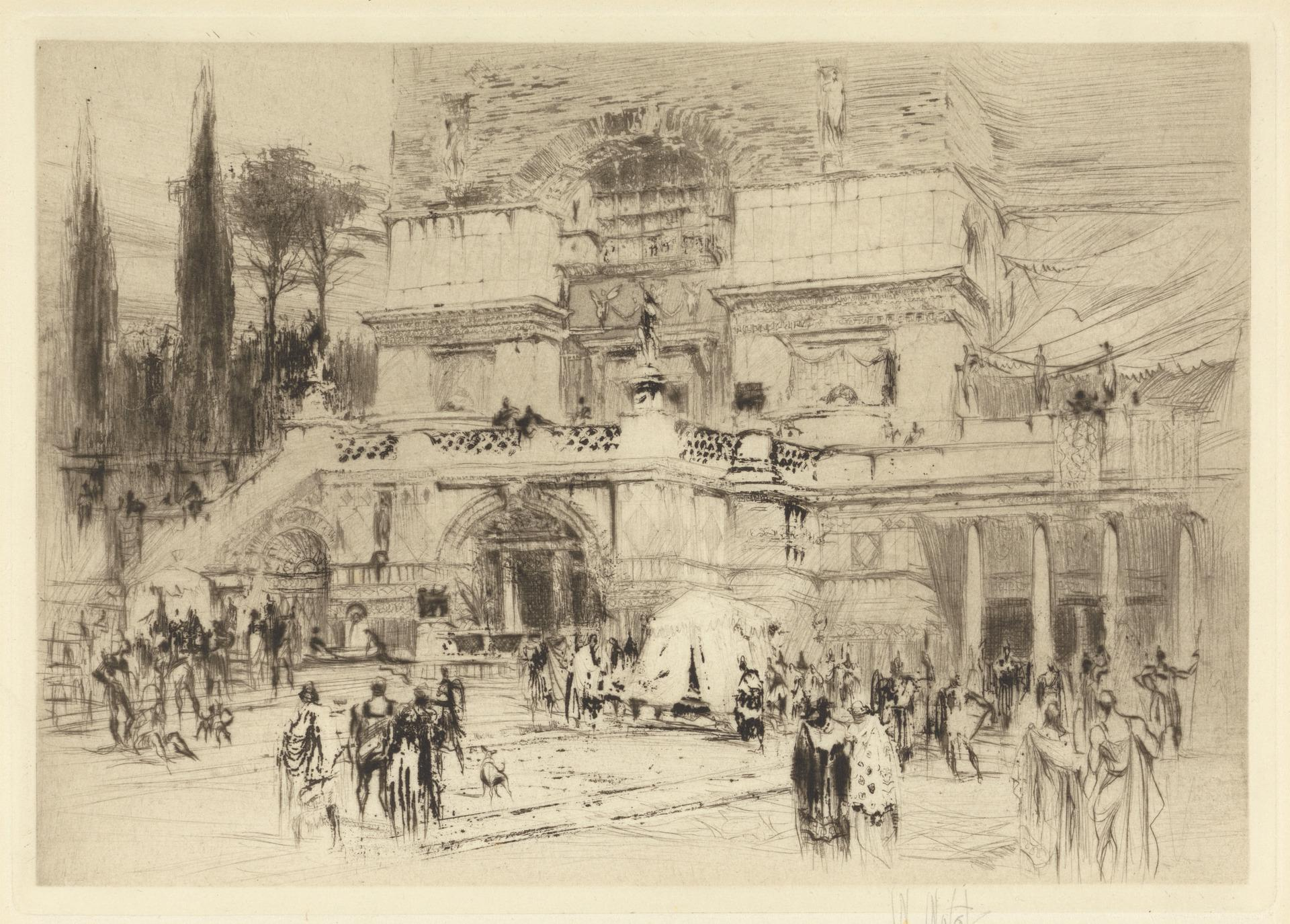
William Walcot, Villa Quintillii, etching, drypoint, & aquatint, 1921, 181 x 254 mm

After rising to its highest in the 1920s, the market for collecting recent etchings collapsed in the Great Depression after the 1929 Wall Street crash, which after a period of "wild financial speculation" in prices, "made everything unsaleable". The prints curator at the British Museum, Campbell Dodgson, collected contemporary prints which he later gave to the museum. He began collecting and writing about Muirhead Bone's prints when Bone first exhibited in London in 1902, paying one or two guineas at Bone's dealer. By 1918 he was paying far higher prices, up to £51 and £63. He continued to buy Bones up to the 1940s, by which time the prices were back to 1902 levels. However a record price of £250 was paid for Ayr Prison (1905) "Bone's masterpiece" (according to Dodgson) "as late as 1933", bought by Oskar Reinhart in Switzerland.

Without a large group of collectors many artists returned to painting, though in the US from 1935 the Federal Art Project, part of the New Deal, put some money into printmaking. Etchings fell hugely in value until the 1980s when a new market (albeit a small one) began to develop for what is now seen as a small but important tributary of the stream of 19th- and 20th-century art.

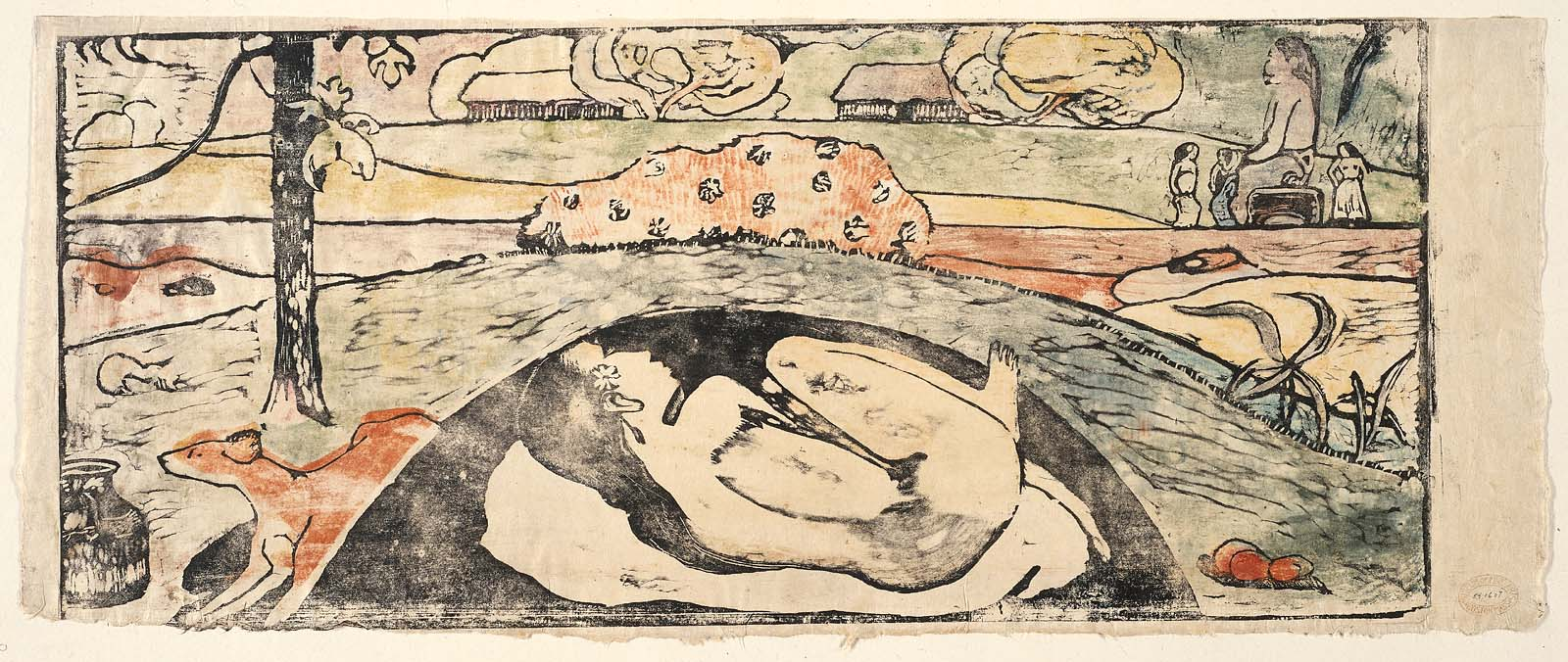
Paul Gauguin, Manao Tupapau ("The Spirit of the Dead Watching"), 1894–95, woodcut with hand and stencilled colour

As well as the Great Depression, the monochrome tradition of Haden and Whistler had reached something of a dead end, "largely resistant" to "the need to find recognisably modern subject-matter and forms of expression". A review in 1926 by Edward Hopper of Fine Prints of the Year, 1925 expressed this with some brutality: "We have had a long and weary familiarity with these 'true etchers' who spend their industrious lives weaving pleasing lines around old doorways, Venetian palaces, Gothic cathedrals, and English bridges on the copper ... One wanders through this desert of manual dexterity without much hope ... Of patient labour and skill there is in this book a plenty and more. Of technical experiment or strongly personal vision and contact with modern life, there is little or none". Etching, of urban subjects similar to his later paintings, had been important in establishing Hopper's early reputation, but around 1924 he decided to concentrate on painting instead.

== Status of artists ==
Printmaking had traditionally had a much lower status in the art world, especially the notoriously conservative academies, than the "major" media of painting and sculpture. This had long been a bone of contention between the Royal Academy in London and the reproductive printmakers, who in 1853 finally won the ability to be elected to the inferior membership status of "Academician Engraver", and some space in the Academy's important exhibitions. At the start of the revival the majority of artists concerned were also painters, and not especially concerned by this disparity, but over the last decades of the 19th century this changed, as artists whose main efforts went into printmaking became more common.

In England Haden was the main activist on this front, beginning in 1879 in a series of lectures on etching at the Royal Institution, and continuing over the following years with a flow of letters, articles and lectures. His role as co-founder and first President of the Society of Painter-Etchers, now the Royal Society of Painter-Printmakers, was part of these efforts, also providing a new set of exhibitions. Although several artists such as Frank Short and William Strang (both elected full RA in 1906) were better known for their prints than their paintings, and helped to agitate for change from within the Academy, the distinction between "Academician Engravers" and full "Academicians" was not abolished until 1928.
