= Surface tone =

Printmaking technique

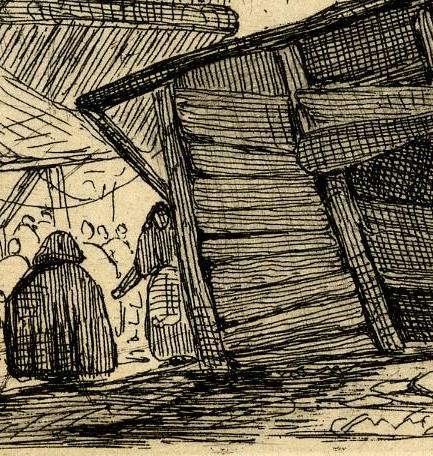
Detail of an etching of 1841 with surface tone on the structure at right, and its shadow (the whole print).

In printmaking, surface tone, or surface-tone, is produced by deliberately or accidentally not wiping all the ink off the surface of the printing plate, so that parts of the image have a light tone from the film of ink left. Tone in printmaking meaning areas of continuous colour, as opposed to the linear marks made by an engraved or drawn line. The technique can be used with all the intaglio printmaking techniques, of which the most important are engraving, etching, drypoint, mezzotint and aquatint. It requires individual attention on the press before each impression is printed, and is mostly used by artists who print their own plates, such as Rembrandt, "the first master of this art", who made great use of it.

Before the invention of tonal intaglio techniques such as mezzotint and aquatint surface tone was really the only way to add tonal effects, but the technique sometimes continued to be used with the new tonal techniques, especially in the etching revival than began around 1850, the "most visible characteristic of [which]... was an obsession with surface tone". This was perhaps under the influence of Rembrandt, whose reputation had by this point reached its full height.

According to Antony Griffiths and others, the technique should be distinguished from accidental plate tone caused by slight imperfections or scratches in a new copper printing plate, which hold the ink and show in the print. These generally disappear after a few impressions are printed, and are taken as a sign that an impression is a very early one. However some scholars use the terms as synonyms.

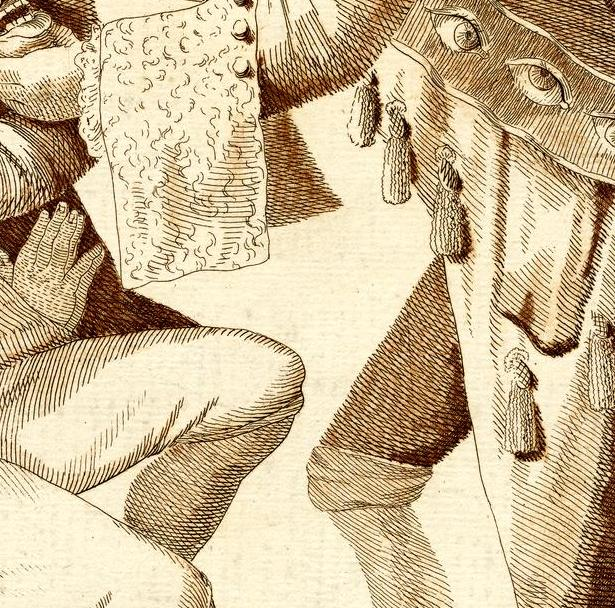
Detail of a satirical etching in brown ink by Thomas Patch, 1770 (the whole print)

Especially in the case of Rembrandt, the degree of surface tone used can vary greatly between impressions, and it is often only discussed in works such as catalogues which cover specific impressions, and ignored in those discussing a print in a general way, as other impressions may lack it. Especially if heavy, it also tends to reproduce badly in book illustrations, smothering detail, and is often avoided for that reason. A note at the start of the most widely available book reproducing all Rembrandt's prints explains that, where possible, impressions without surface tone were selected for this reason.

== Technique ==
The intaglio printmaking techniques all print images from ink held in the lines or other recesses made by the artist in the printing plate. For each impression, ink is spread over the whole plate, worked well in, and then the flat surface is normally wiped carefully clean to remove all ink except that in the recesses, using a form of squeegee. The print is then run through a high-pressure press with a piece of slightly damp paper, forcing the soft paper down into the recesses to collect the ink there.

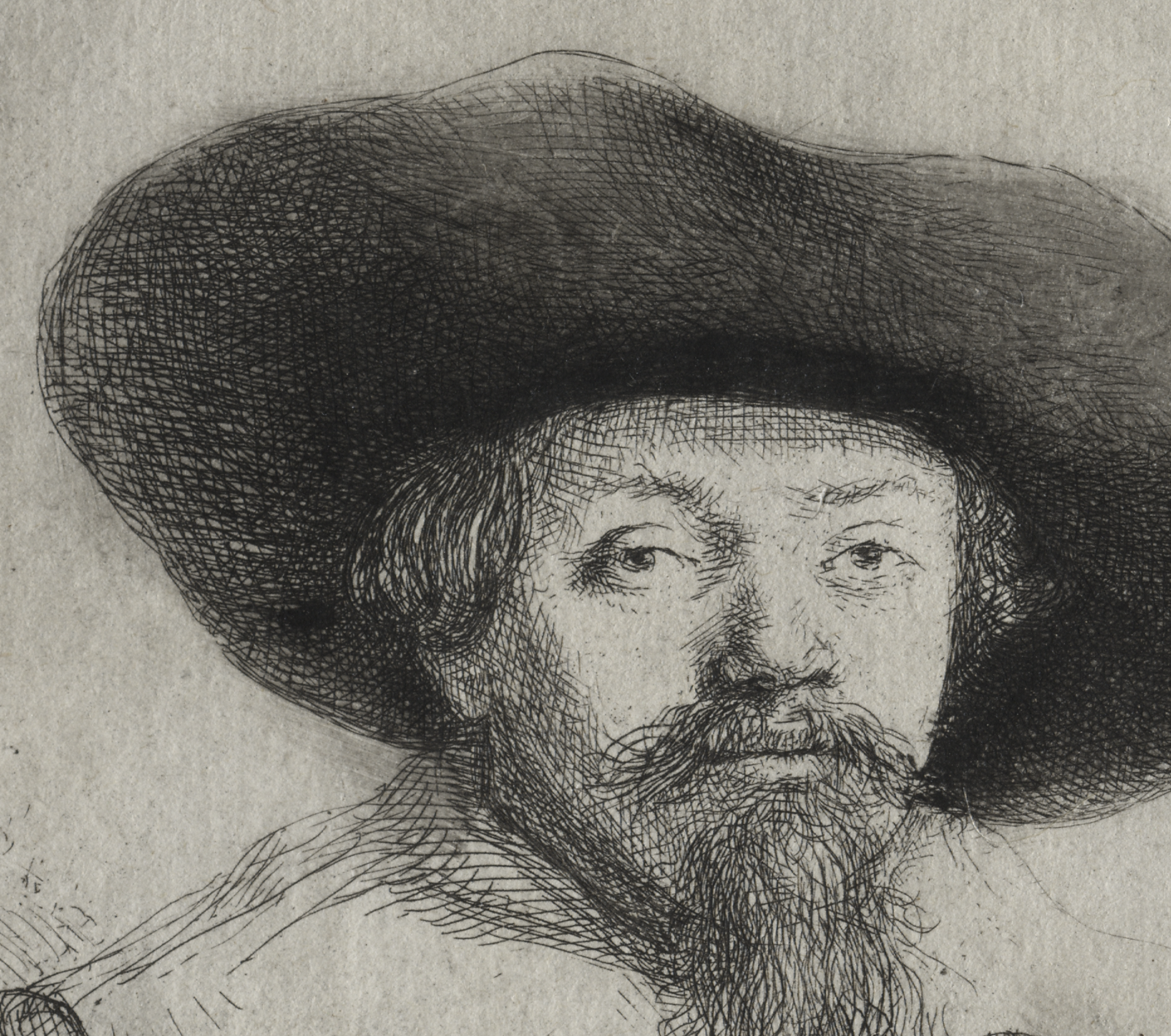
Detail of a Rembrandt etched portrait, 1636, with tone over much of the hat (the whole print).

To create surface tone, parts of the image are selectively not fully cleaned, leaving a thin film of ink on the surface of the plate, which prints as a "pale and attractive bloom". In practice the plate was perhaps often fully cleaned, and then a cloth dirty with ink used to re-add the film. Sources often distinguish degrees of tone, as "heavy" or "light". Surface tone could also occur by accident, "due to the incompetence of the printer".

Retroussage, sometimes "dragging out", was a related technique involving working along the lines in an inked and wiped plate with a piece of muslin to pull out a little of the ink, so giving a softer or blurry effect to the sides of the line. The effect could be similar to the short-lived "burr" on a drypoint.

== Leading exponents ==
The technique became very widely used, but a few important artists who made heavy use of it should be mentioned. Hercules Seghers was a highly experimental printmaker in many respects. He was not very famous in his lifetime, but was keenly collected by Rembrandt, who was "probably inspired" to use surface tone by his example. Rembrandt used it in his late prints, from about 1647 onwards, and only in some impressions. It was one of a number of ways, notably including printing on different papers, and vellum, and using the burr from drypoint, that he used to vary the appearance of his etchings. In several impressions of his Flight into Egypt: A Night Piece (B. 53) surface tone covers most of the plate.

Francisco Goya's mature prints were mostly in the tonal technique of aquatint, in which he became very skilled in producing dramatic contrasts, fully satisfying his needs for tonal effects. Reflecting the mid-19th century taste for a "rich overall tone", when his series The Disasters of War (1810–20) was given its first real edition in 1863 by the Real Academia de Bellas Artes de San Fernando, they made the "disastrous" choice to make considerable use of surface tone, which is not seen in the few early impressions made by Goya himself. Instead of the "luminosity and delicacy" of these, the later editions "provide a dulled and distorted reflection of the artist's intentions", according to Juliet Wilson Bareau.

James Whistler was heavily influenced as a printmaker by Rembrandt, and in his "middle period" made great use of surface tone, before reducing it in his later work.

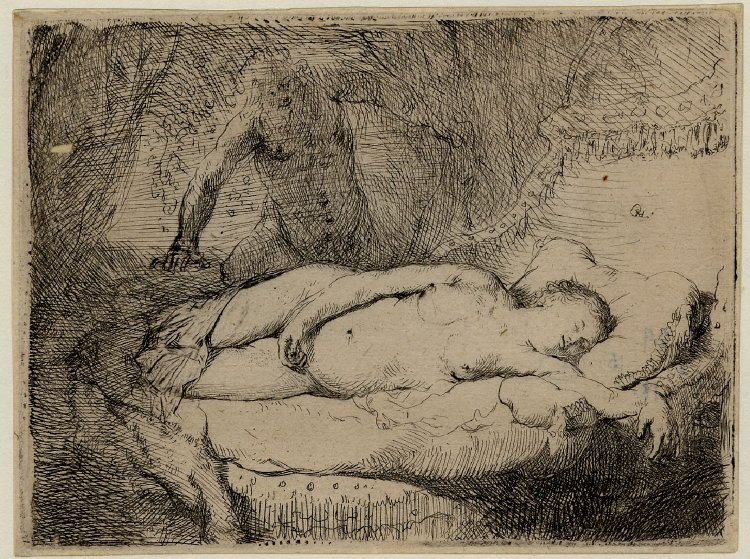
Rembrandt, Jupiter and Antiope, the smaller plate, etching, c. 1631

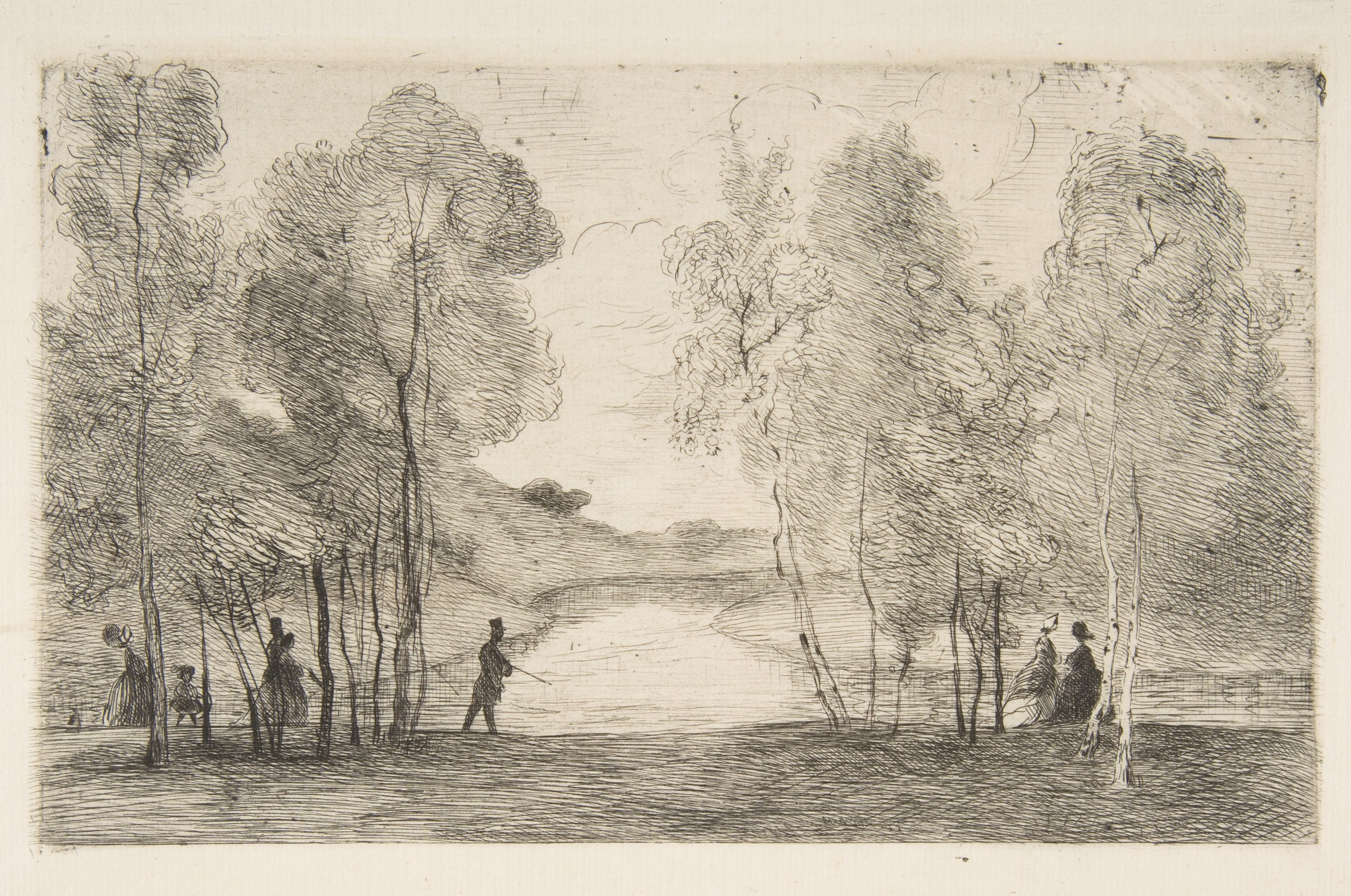
Félix Bracquemond, La Lac du Bois de Boulogne, 1858

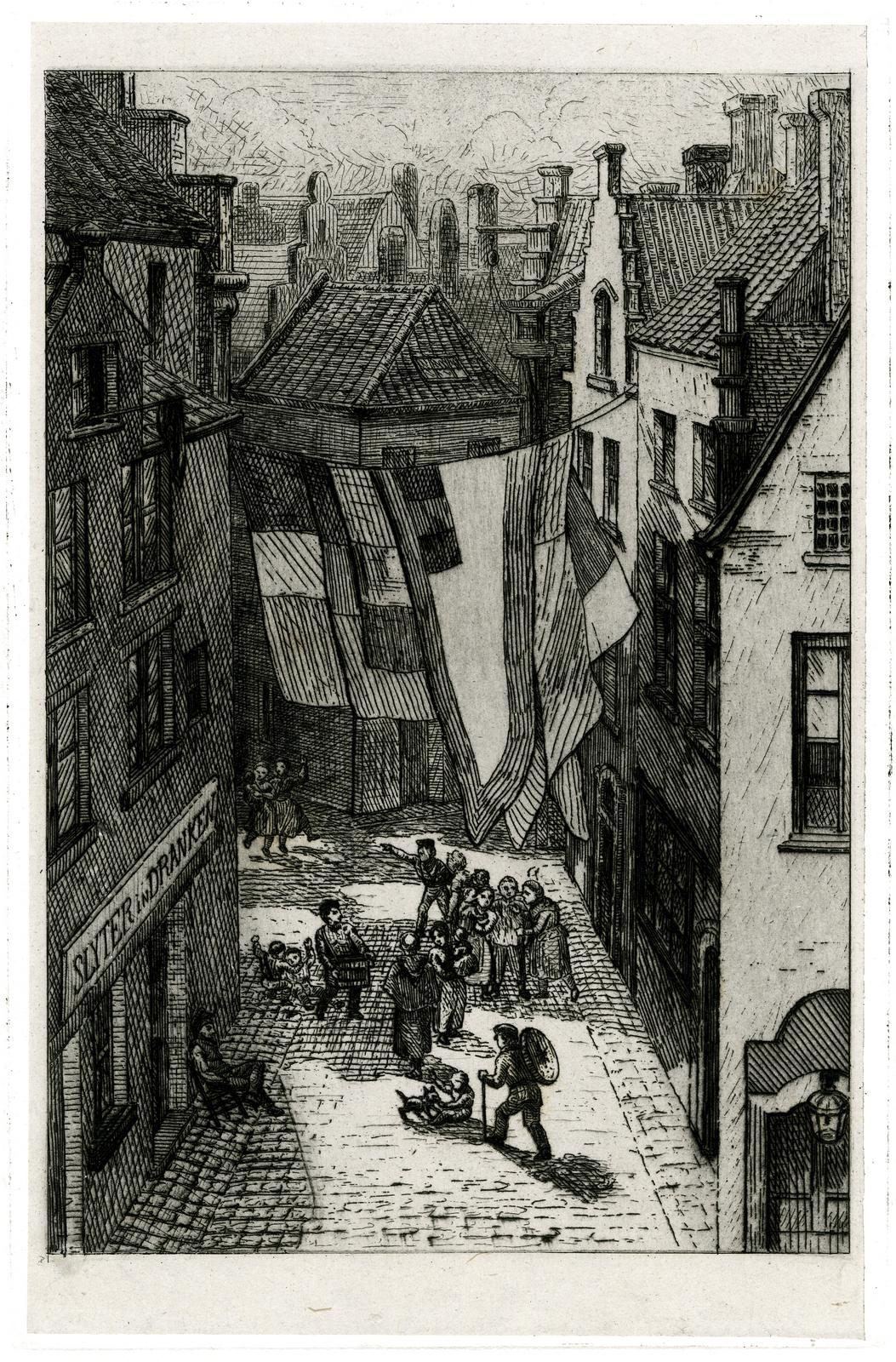
Edgar Alfred Baes, Un jour de fête au quartier St. André à Anvers, drypoint, 1873
