= Eugène Bléry =

French engraver (1805–1887)

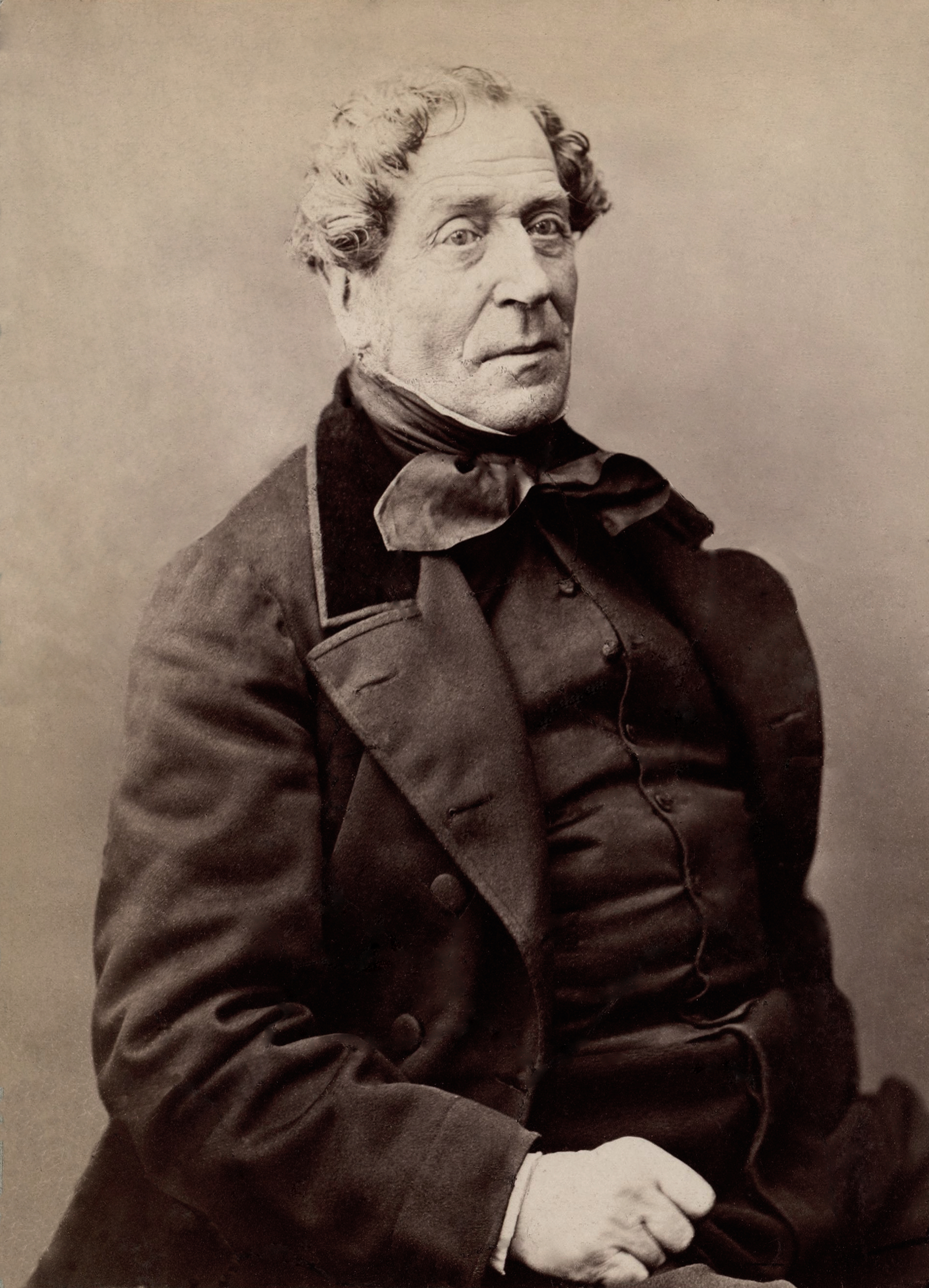
Blery, by Nadar

Eugène Stanislas Alexandre Bléry (3 March 1805–7 June 1887), was a French engraver.

He was born into a military family at Fontainebleau, where his father taught mathematics and fortifications at the military school. The school transferred in 1808 to Saint-Cyr, where it became the École spéciale militaire de Saint-Cyr and where Bléry spent his youth. Under the patronage of the comtesse de Montalivet, he became skilled in lithography as early as the 1820s, and learned acquaforte etching soon afterwards. With the encouragement of his Montalivet patrons, he established a reputation for etchings and engravings of countryside scenes, trees and wild flowers. He was known for working out of doors, which was unusual for engravers at the time. He later became the teacher of the celebrated etcher of street-scenes of Paris, Charles Méryon.

He died at his home in the 6th arrondissement of Paris.
