= Charles Meryon =

French artist (1821–1868)

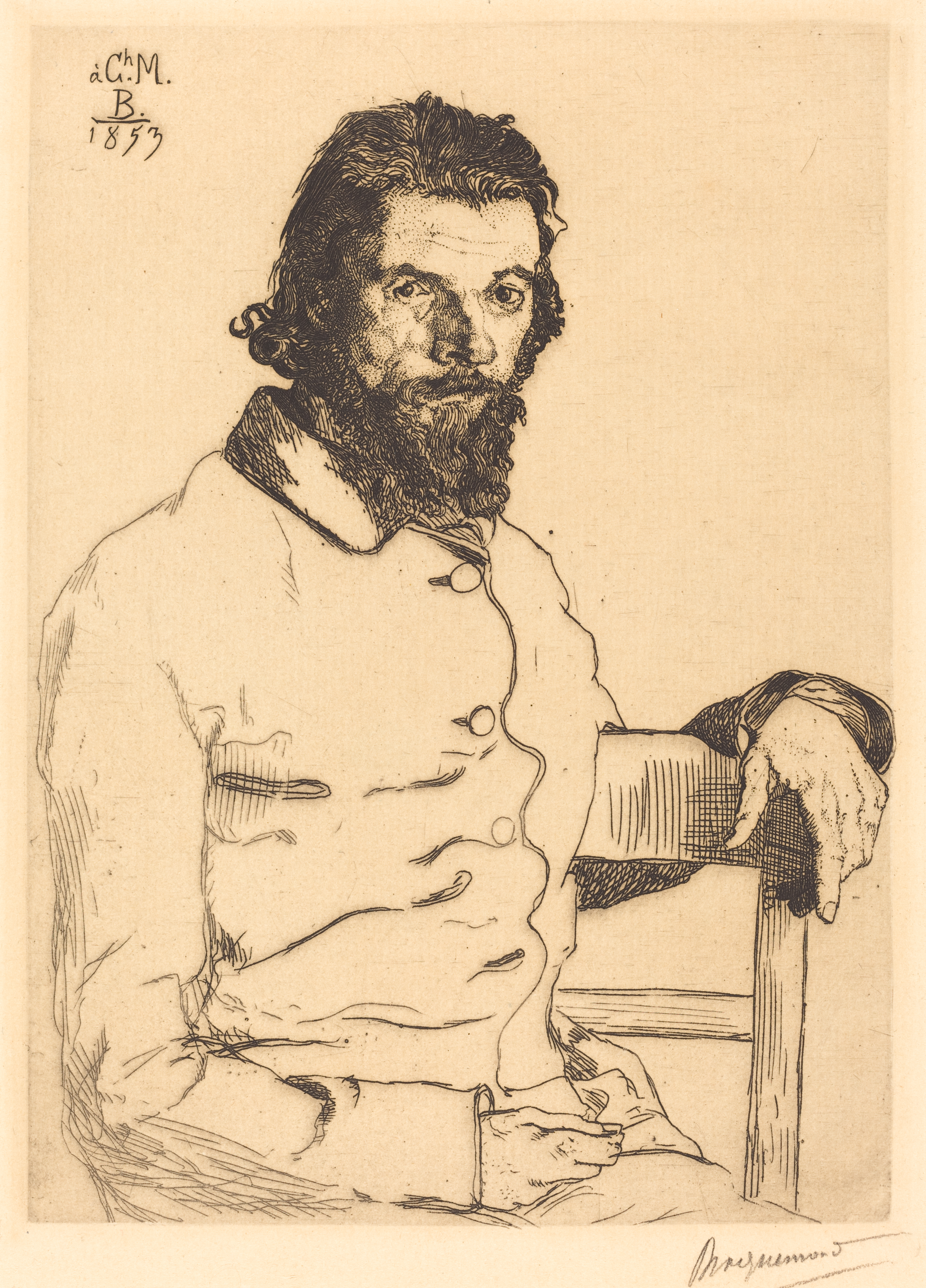
Portrait of Meryon, 1853 etching by Félix Bracquemond

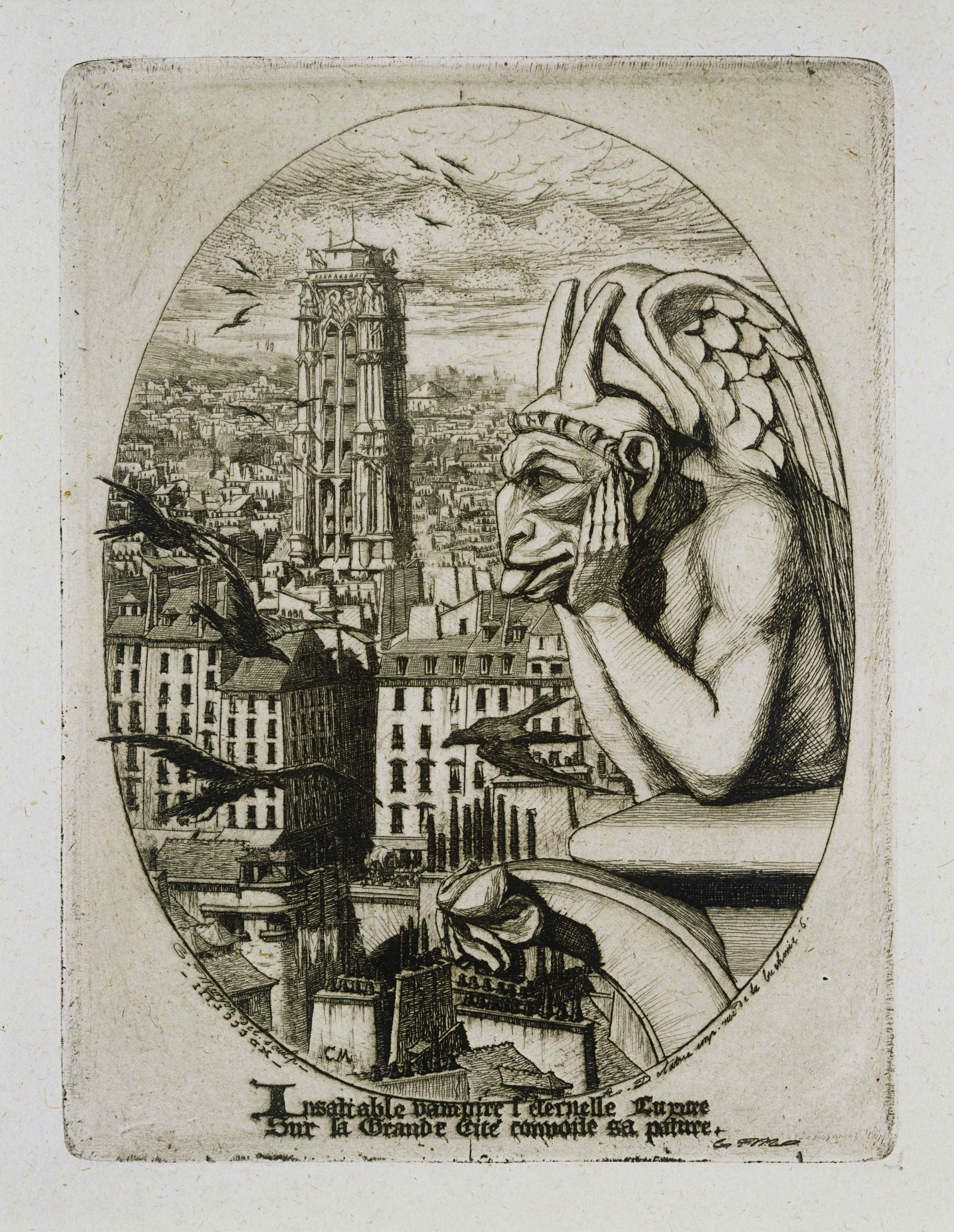
Le Stryge (The Gargoyle or The Vampire), 1853. Now Meryon's most famous print, though somewhat untypical.

Charles Meryon (sometimes Méryon, 23 November 1821 – 14 February 1868) was a French artist who worked almost entirely in etching, as he had colour blindness. Although now little-known in the English-speaking world, he is generally recognised as the most significant etcher of 19th century France. His most famous works are a series of views powerfully conveying his distinctive Gothic vision of Paris. He also had mental illness, dying in an asylum.

Meryon's mother was a dancer at the Paris Opera, who moved to London around 1814 to dance there. In 1818 she had a daughter by Viscount Lowther, the future William Lowther, 2nd Earl of Lonsdale, a wealthy aristocrat and politician, and 1821 Charles Meryon by Dr Charles Lewis Meryon, an English doctor, returning to Paris for the birth, and remaining there for the rest of her life. The household in Paris was supported financially by both fathers, but more so by Lowther, whose indirect funding remained important throughout Meryon's life; he made very little money from his art.

Starting at the age of 16, Meryon spent ten years as a naval cadet and finally officer, which included tours of the Mediterranean, and a four year voyage around the world, for most of it based in New Zealand, where the French then maintained an imperial toe-hold. On his return he fought and was wounded in a pro-government militia during political disturbances in 1848.

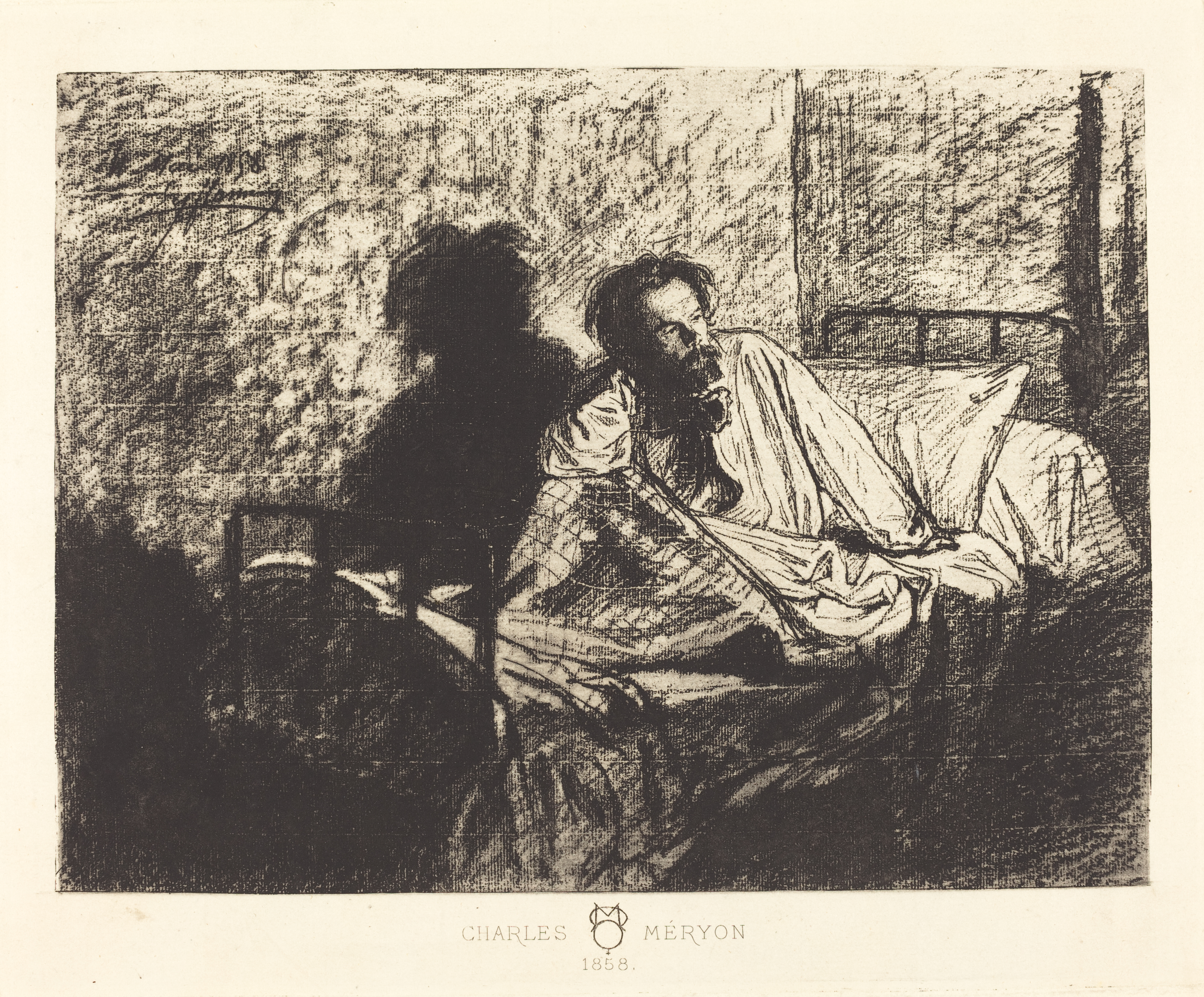
Meryon by Léopold Flameng, 1858, print based on a drawing made the night before he entered the asylum

He had become seriously interested in art during his naval career, starting to take lessons. He gradually and reluctantly realized that his colour-blindness ruled out painting, and by 1848 settled on etching, then out of favour as a medium for fine art, though about to undergo a considerable revival. His best period lasted between 1850 and about 1856, before his increasing mental illness reduced his output. He spent fourteen months in an asylum in 1858 and 1859, then continued to work until 1866, when he re-entered the asylum for the final time.

== Birth and childhood ==
Meryon's mother, Pierre-Narcisse Chaspoux, was a Parisian, born in 1791, who became a dancer in the Paris Opera in 1807 with the stage name of Narcisse Gentil. Her appearances there stop in 1814, and it was presumably about this time that she moved to London, where she became the mistress of Viscount Lowther, the future William Lowther, 2nd Earl of Lonsdale, then an unmarried Tory MP, junior minister, and friend of the Prince Regent. She had a daughter Frances (Fanny) by him in 1818. She was also friendly with Dr Charles Lewis Meryon, who had been a fellow boarder at 10 Warwick Street, Charing Cross, off Cockspur Street, around 1818. In 1821, when she was appearing as a dancer at the London Opera, Pierre-Narcisse became pregnant by Meryon, and returned to Paris with Fanny, Dr Meryon having left for Florence. Charles Meryon was born in the rue Rameau, round the corner from the then site of the Opera.

His father, Dr Meryon, had been working at St Thomas' Hospital at this time, but had spent the years 1810 to 1817 in the Middle East as (at that point unqualified) doctor to the aristocratic traveller Lady Hester Stanhope, who he was later to visit in Lebanon three times, seeing her for the last time in 1838. He continued to correspond with Pierre-Narcisse, and pay maintenance for his son, probably of 600 francs a year. The letters became increasingly uncomfortable, and she only found out about his marriage, which had been in 1823, by accident in 1831. Equally, Pierre-Narcisse was rather more generously supported by Lowther, who saw her and Fanny when he was in Paris, but she was keen to keep him unaware of the existence of Charles, although the two fathers were acquaintances in London. Both fathers apparently continued to know her under her stage name of "Narcisse Gentil".

Charles was registered at birth as a "Chaspoux", and eventually (in 1829) baptised in the Church of England by the chaplain of the British Embassy in Paris. In 1824 his father legally acknowledged paternity, and he was re-registered as "Meryon", although apparently usually known as "Gentil" as a child. For over a year after his birth he lived with friends of his mother some 20 kilometres outside Paris, visited not very frequently by his mother, sister and grandmother. He could walk at 9 months. He was moved back to Paris in January 1823, and from late 1825 Fanny was at a boarding school.

By late in 1826 he had entered the "Pension Savary", one of a number of small boarding schools in the Paris suburb of Passy; Camille Pissarro was a pupil some years later. He remained there until 1836, apart from a period with his father in 1834–35, and it seems to have been a generally happy time in his life. In 1834 his father, with his wife and children, was living in Marseille, where Charles joined them for an extended visit in May 1834; he had previously seen him on a few occasions. They spent the winter in north Italy, reaching as far as Florence; Charles was back in Paris by May 1835. Although in most respects he enjoyed the visit, and had happy memories of it, it appears that "the relationships within the family were not explained" to Charles, and perhaps other members, and this, the last time he would see his father, contributed to a growing resentment Charles felt towards him.

Meryon's mother died in October 1838, when he was already in the French Naval School in Brest in Brittany. After this his half-sister Fanny went to live in England, where she married in 1840. She remained in touch with him for the rest of his life. He had his grandmother still in Paris, until her death in 1845, and various cousins and family friends in and around Paris.

== In the Navy ==
=== Training ===
Meryon later said that he first became attracted to a naval career by "the animation of the quays of Marseilles", on his visit to his father, and from his letters to his father it is clear this had become a clear intention by the end of 1835. He entered the Naval school in Brest in November 1837, having come 47th in the competitive entry exam, out of 68 candidates who passed.

By the end of his first half-year he was ranked 15th, then 19th six months later. By September 1839 he was 11th out of 60 remaining in his class. He "consistently scored a near-perfect mark in Drawing", did well in English (after greatly improving this when with his father) and Gunnery. The training in drawing covered not only making charts and sketches of coastlines, important skills for naval officers, but "picturesque and linear" drawing of heads and landscapes.

The school for future naval officers had only been founded in 1827. It was based on the ship Orion and the course lasted two years. The pupils almost never set foot on shore, and Meryon's claim to have not done so for 22 months seems plausible. The routine and discipline were harsh, but Meryon made life-long friends, including Ernest Mouchez.

Meryon joined his first ship, the Alger at Toulon in October 1839, as a cadet, second class. Initially he lodged onshore. After a trip to Algiers carrying troops, the ship left Toulon to join the French Levant squadron in the Aegean Sea in February 1840, allowing Meryon to visit Athens, Corinth, Argos, Melos and Mycenae. In April 1840 he transferred to the Montebello near modern İzmir (then Smyrna) in Turkey, with which he revisited Greece, then France, before visiting Tunis, then of great political interest to the French, and Carthage. In January 1842 he was promoted to cadet, first class.

=== Voyage around the world ===
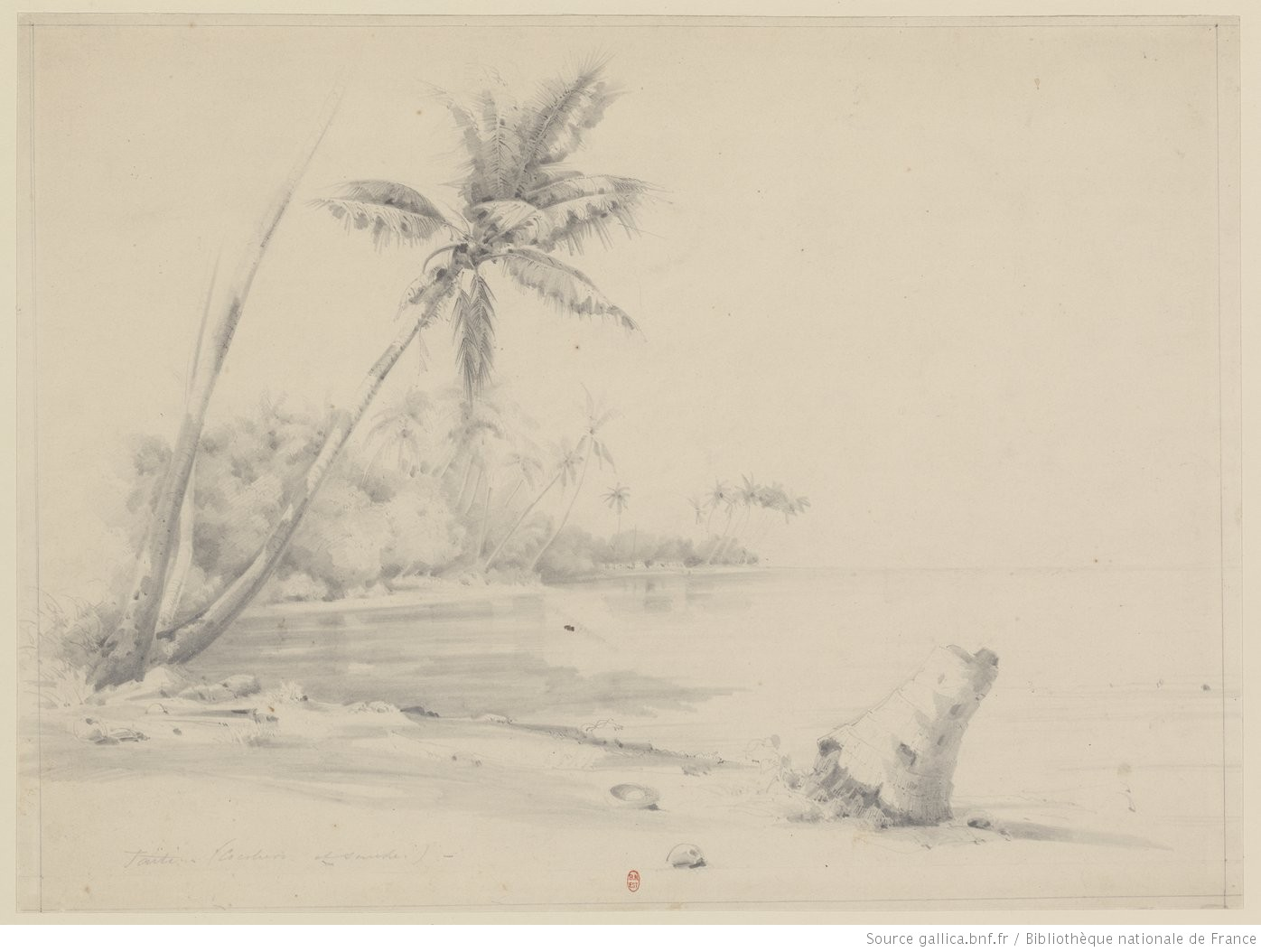
Drawing made in Tahiti, 1844–45

In the corvette "Le Rhin" he made a voyage round the world from 1842 to September 1846. The purpose of the voyage was to promote French interests in New Zealand, which the French government was not yet ready to accept as wholly a British territory; there were also French whaling interests to protect. A small French settlement on the South Island had been established on an earlier voyage. The French naval "New Zealand station" was to end while the Rhin was returning home, when the replacement ship, the Seine, was wrecked on the coast of New Caledonia.

The French base in New Zealand was Akaroa, or Port Louis-Philippe as the French still called it, then a small whaling-station, with a mostly French population. The Rhin reached it on 18 January 1843, and was replaced in April 1846. The outward voyage began on 15 August 1842, heading across the Atlantic, passing Tenerife, but not landing until Bahia in Brazil was reached in October, where they spent nearly two weeks. They then changed direction, rounding the Cape of Good Hope, and arriving at Hobart, Tasmania in late December, staying only a week, before sailing for Akaroa, which they reached on 11 January 1843.

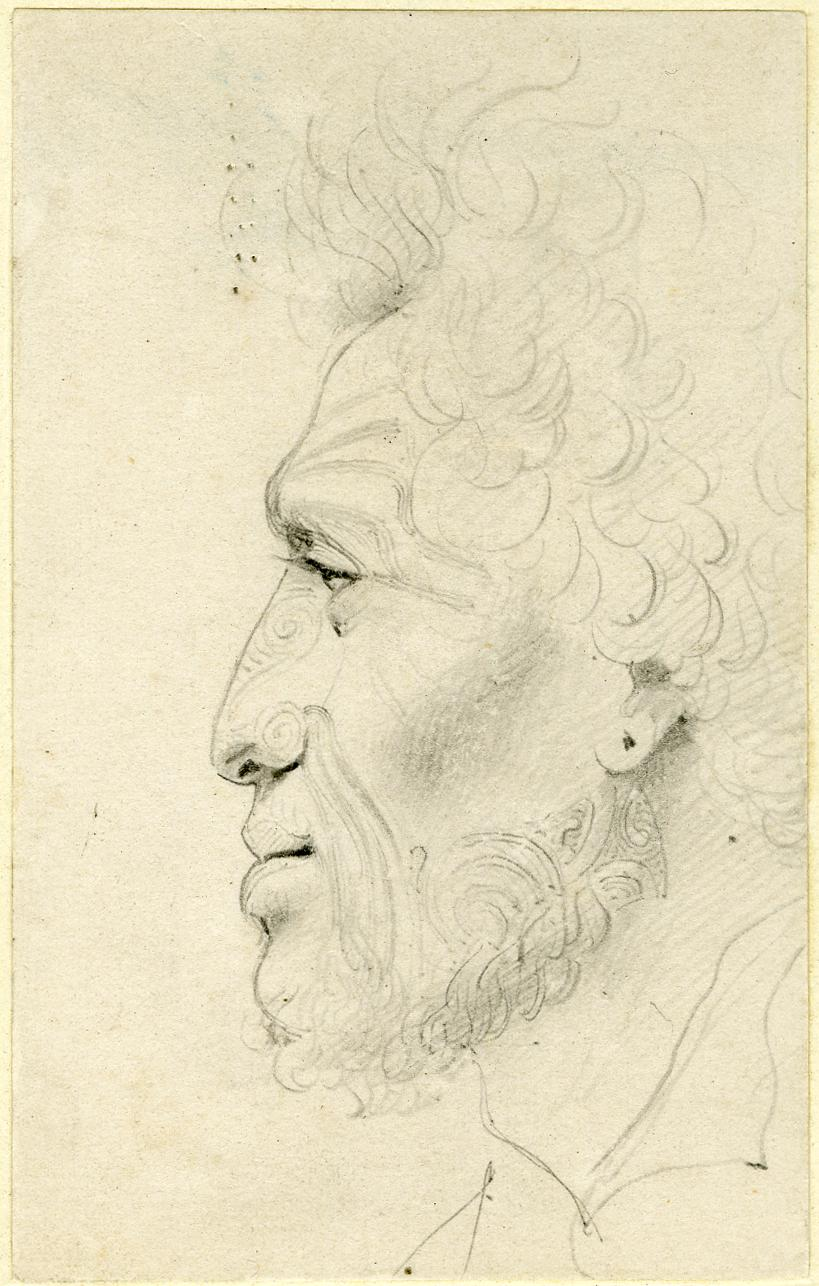
Drawing Head of a Maori, made during his voyage

Relations between the French and British populations, and even their officials, were cordial or friendly, despite the British tightening their control over this period, for example restricting the fishing rights allowed to French boats. But both sides were aware the question of French claims would be settled back in Europe. In May and June 1843 the Rhin visited Wellington for ten days, then Auckland. In October they set off for Australia, via Kororareka near the tip of the North Island, today Russell, New Zealand, where they stayed until early November. Less than 18 months later the so-called Flagstaff War between the British and Māori was to break out there. In November Meryon was, back in Paris, promoted to ensign, the lowest rank of naval officer, although the news did not reach him on the Rhin until July the next year.

At the end of August 1844 the Rhin sailed for Valparaíso in Chile "to buy stores, particularly wine, which was very expensive in Sydney". After staying two weeks they set off on the return voyage on 6 November 1844, stopping at the Marquesas and Tahiti, which had just come under French "protection", and where there were a total of seven French naval ships at that point. The Rhin reached Akaroa again on 8 February 1845, hoping to find that its replacement ship had arrived, and they could return to France. But the ship had not come, and in March tensions between the Maori and Europeans had sharply increased, increasing the warmth of local Franco-British relations.

The replacement ship Seine finally arrived on 8 March 1846, and the Rhin set sail for home on the 16th. They passed Cape Horn in early May, and landed at Saint Helena on 14 June, staying a week. Meryon's visit to Napoleon's final home would come to haunt him in later years. After a brief stop at Ascension Island, they passed into the Mediterranean and spent four days at the French North African port of Mers El-Kebir from 18 August. They finally landed at Toulon on 28 August, four years and 13 days after they left it.

=== Art during his naval career ===
Meryon had sketched in Athens, Algiers and other exotic places he had visited, and by late 1840 decided to take lessons in drawing from the Toulon artist Vincent Courdouan, who was then 30. He had thought of painting in watercolour, but decided he did not have time to learn this at first, but studied using sepia washes. He took full watercolour up in November 1841, when a letter to his father is the first documented mention of his colour-blindness; possibly he had not realized he had the condition before. At this time he seems to have hoped the condition would improve. Courdouan's style made much use of strong contrasts of light and dark tones, which is also characteristic of Meryon's art in the 1850s.

Throughout his voyage on the Rhin he made drawings, many of which he turned into etchings some twenty years later. He also dabbled in sculpture, having bought some plaster of Paris in Sydney in 1843. He made busts and heads of Maori people, none of which have survived. After a dead whale washed up at Akaroa he made a coloured plaster model of whale nearly two metres long, which was later placed on display in the Muséum national d'histoire naturelle (National Museum of Natural History) in Paris, before being transferred to the Muséum d'Histoire naturelle de La Rochelle (in La Rochelle) in 1926.

A number of drawings he made of Maori men with heavily tattooed faces survive, but most of his drawings from the voyage show landscapes, houses, or boats sailing near the coast. His drawing of full human figures (or animals) shows his lack of training, but these views of areas where very few Western artists had reached by the 1840s are rather conventional. Some critics have been intrigued by the contrast between his lack of artistic engagement with the very different visual cultures he encountered on his voyage, some at this date relatively little subdued by Western expansion, and his exploration of his return to Paris of a sometimes sinister exoticism based on Gothic Paris. In particular Le Stryge has the forceful demonic energy which at that date French culture often attributed to exotic cult images from parts of the world where the West was just reaching.

In his last Paris etchings, or his last revisions of them, the fantastic flying creatures that appear in the sky in prints like Le Ministere de la Marine ("The Admiralty"), the last Paris scene, of 1865, include fishing boats from Oceania, and whales hunted or ridden, by harpoon-wielding horsemen. In this case the figures in the sky were present from the first state of the print.

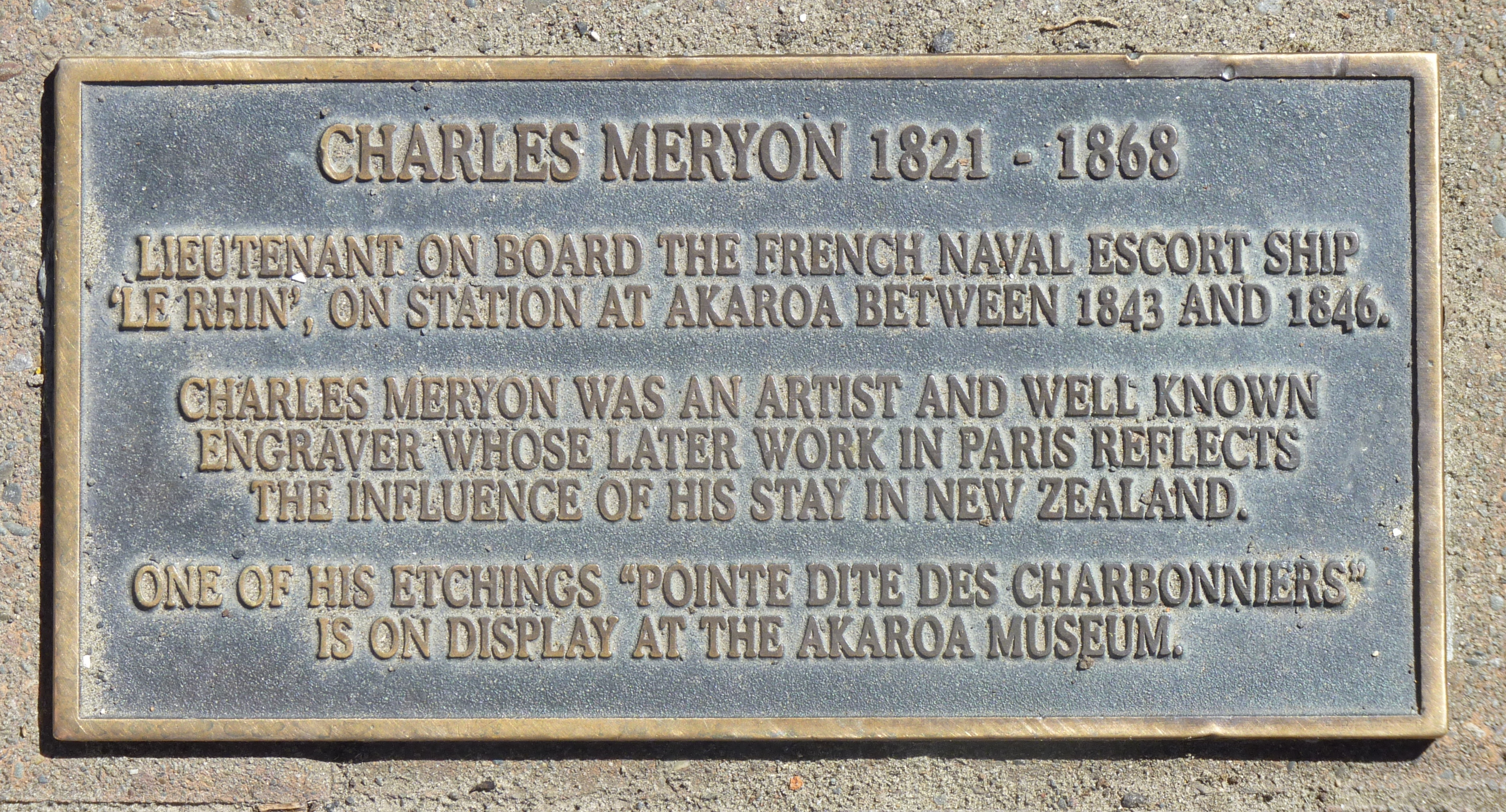
Plaque in Akaroa, New Zealand, where Méryon spent three years

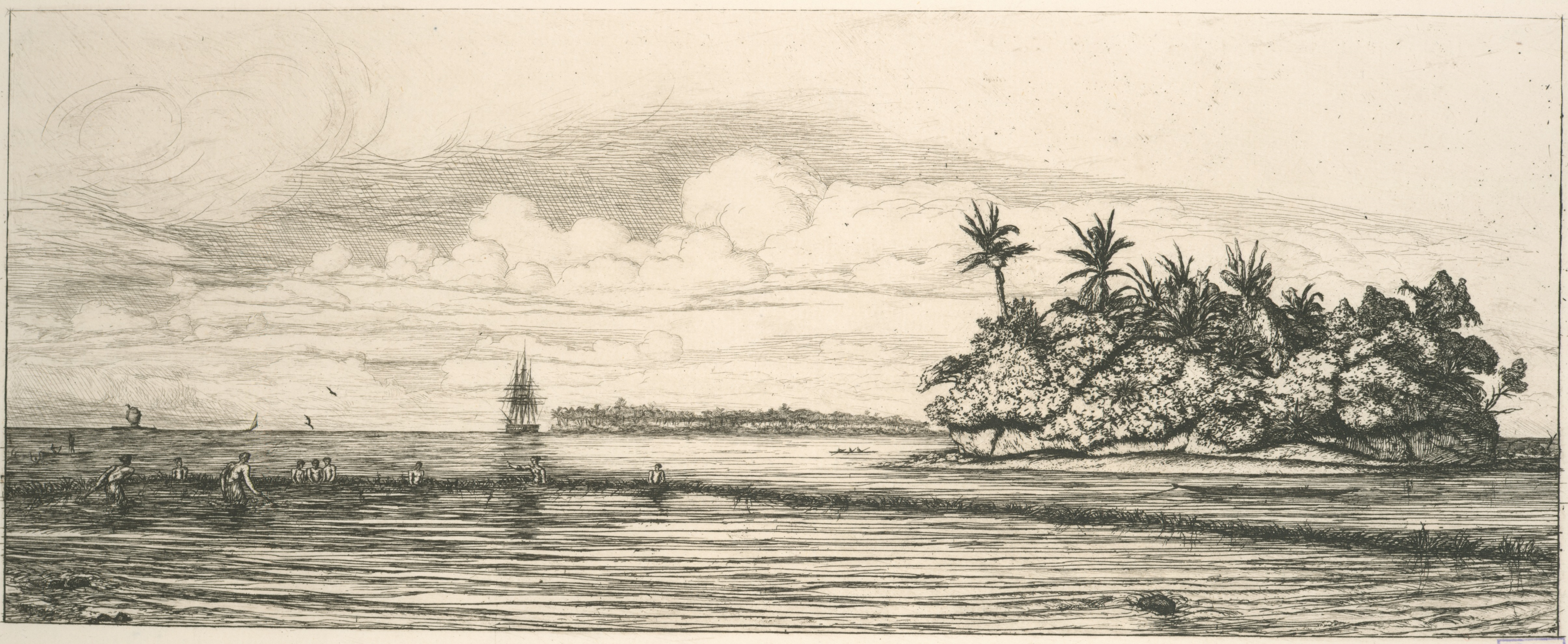
People from Wallis Island fishing, drawn 1845, etched 1863. the drawing

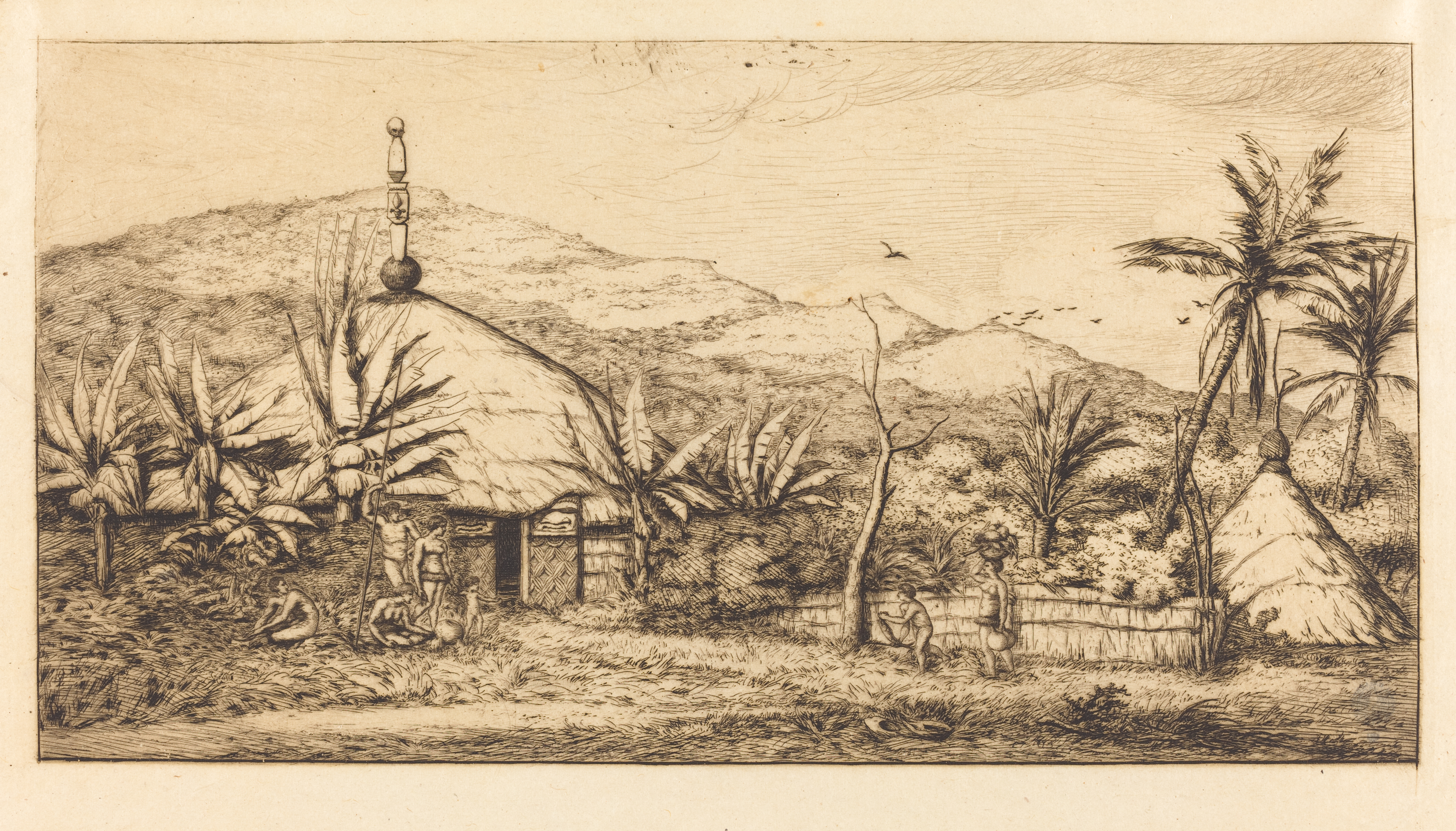
New Caledonia, Large Native Hut on the Road from Balade to Puebo, drawn in 1845, etched in 1863

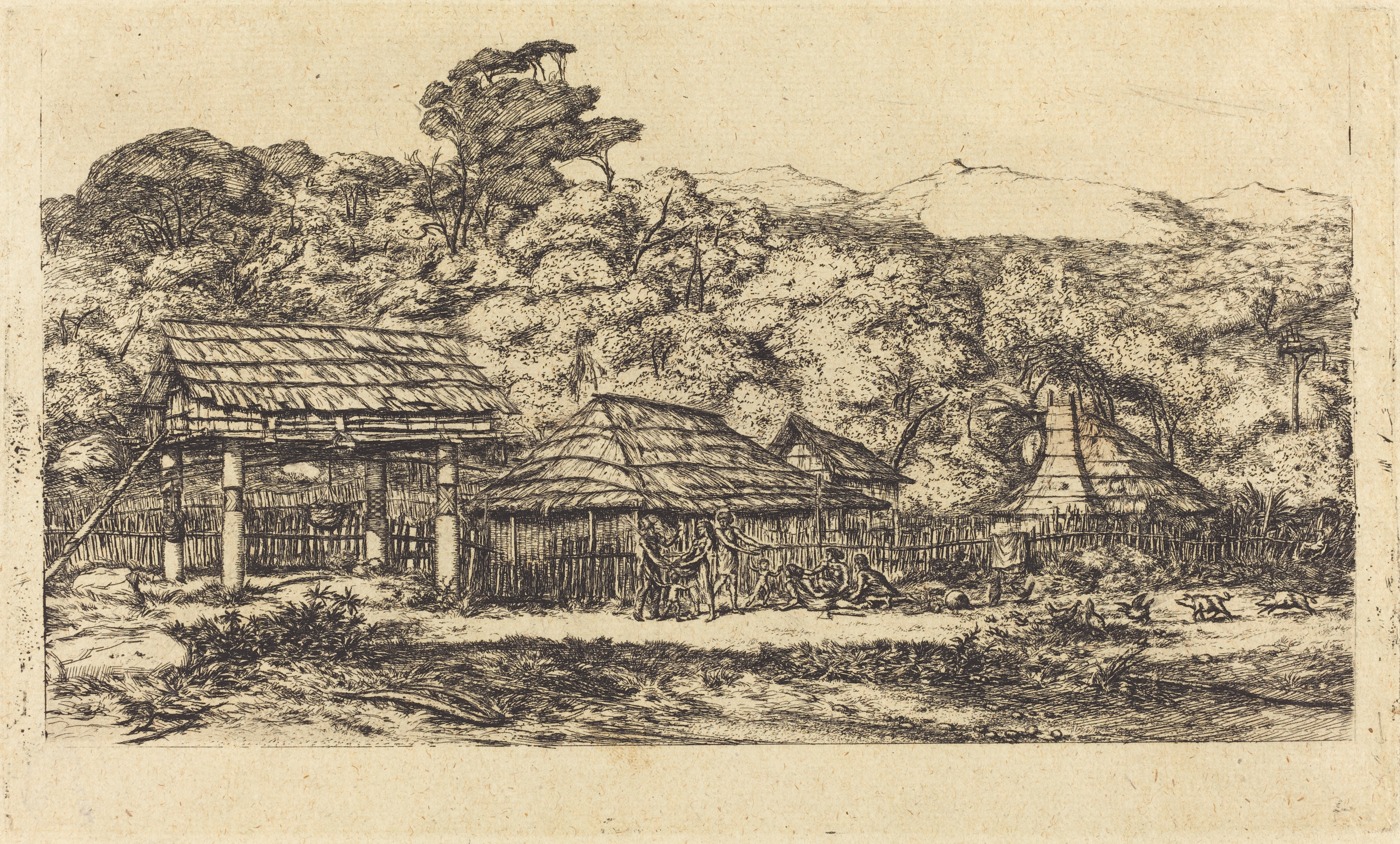
Greniers indigènes et habitations à Akaroa, presqu'Ile de Banks, ("Native Barns and Huts at Akaroa, Banks' Peninsula"), New Zealand, drawn in 1845, etched 1865

== Return to Paris ==
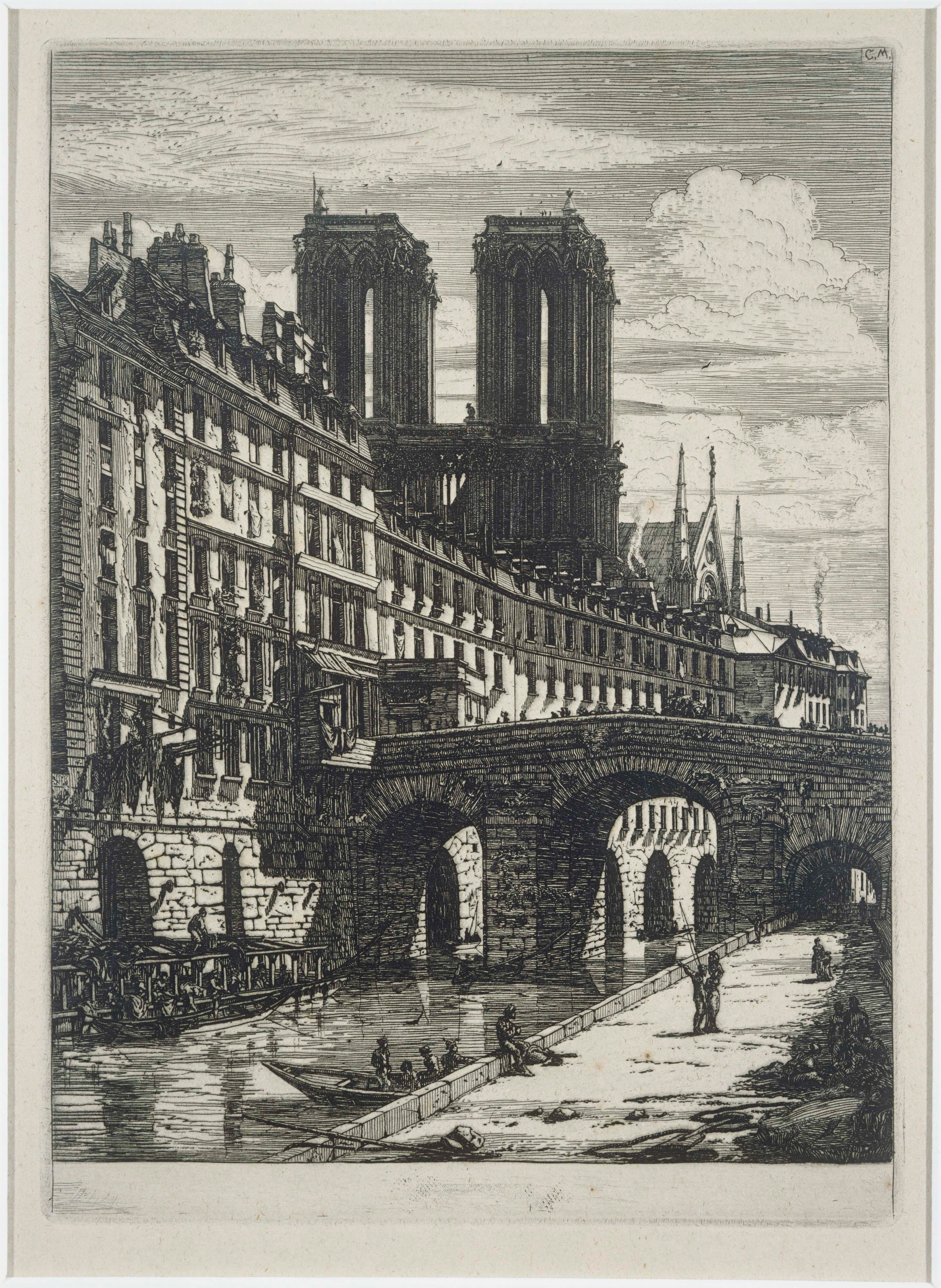
Le Petit Pont ("The Small Bridge"), 1850

On his return from the Rhin voyage in August 1846, Meryon was given eight months leave, and went to Paris. He hoped, and rather expected, to be placed at the end of his leave with the team working on the official scientific publication of the voyage, especially as regards the illustrations; the French Navy had a tradition of taking these books very seriously.

In July 1847 he visited his sister Fanny in London, where she lived with her husband Henry Broadwood, like Fanny's father a Conservative Member of Parliament, from the piano-making family. The visit to London was notable for his refusal to visit his father, who was then living there. The two had corresponded during the Rhin's voyage, and the day he docked in Toulon he wrote to his father offering to visit him in Nice, not realizing he was no longer there. In London, and in the main art cities of Belgium, which he visited on his way back to Paris, he spent much of his time on conventional museum visiting, also going to the theatre in London.

1848 saw rising political tensions in Paris, which overthrew the monarchy in February and culminated in the June Days uprising, when Meryon's immediate neighbourhood saw some intense fighting around the barricades thrown up by the insurgents. He was a member of the National Guard (probably obligatory for a naval officer on leave), which played a crucial role in resisting the uprising on behalf of the French Second Republic, which Meryon generally supported. He "spent almost three days in the street, broken only by hours snatched for sleep", and was slightly wounded.

In May 1847, when his extended leave came to an end, he should have returned to Toulon, but had not. The work on the naval publication, and much else in naval administration, had been thrown into confusion by the political situation, and in July 1848 Meryon decided to resign his commission, possibly to prepare his own book on the voyage, but apparently also because of his health, his doubts about his ability to command men, and because his next posting was unclear. Because he had not reported back to Toulon, at least months of his pay were caught in a bureaucratic tangle, recorded at great length in the naval records. Although the final recommendation for a ministerial decision, the following March, supported paying him, it is not clear whether this actually happened. Several of the memorandums mention his dire financial circumstances.

== Professional artist ==
In a letter to his father dated 5 November 1846 Meryon announced that he was "getting ready to give myself completely to the study of Art". He first approached a minor pupil of Jacques-Louis David, who worked at the War Ministry, who agreed to take him as a student in August 1847, setting him drawing exercises copying famous classical statues and drawings, in the "conventional" academic curriculum. An early notebook (1847–48) with an ambitious list of possible subjects shows a predominance of maritime subjects, many with specific settings drawn from his voyage, such as a scene of Maoris fighting and an Assassination of Captain Cook (in Hawaii in 1779).

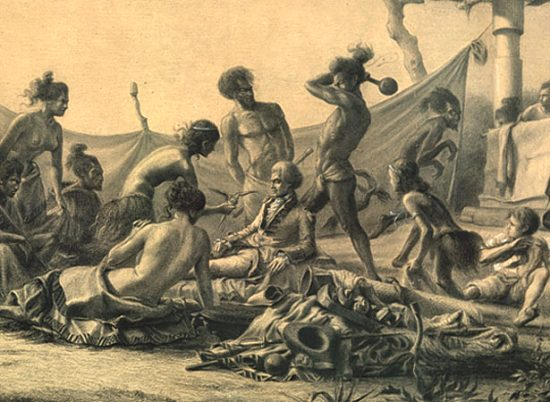
Central section of the book illustration after Meryon's Assassination of Captain Marion du Fresne in New Zealand

At least two finished pastel drawings survive from this period: a dramatic whaling scene, and the Assassination of Captain Marion du Fresne in New Zealand (by Maoris in 1772, at the Bay of Islands, killing 27 in total). Meryon knew the setting well, and the work was exhibited in the annual Paris Salon at the Louvre in 1848. In 1883 it was turned into an etching by Victor-Louis Focillon (father of the art historian Henri Focillon), which was adapted as a book illustration. His drawing is now in the National Library of New Zealand, and remains the best known depiction of the incident.

The drawing seems to have been intended to be redone on a larger scale in oils, and many writers on Meryon have thought that it was the failed attempt to do this that made Meryon realize the impossibility of pursuing a career in a technique using colour. In early 1848 he met the engraver Eugène Bléry, who according to some accounts had taken an interest in his du Fresne drawing. Bléry (1805–87) was a respected and technically very competent etcher, mostly producing landscapes. A precursor of the Etching Revival, he worked in front of his chosen scene not just in making drawings, but etching his plates. Unlike Meryon, he had little interest in architectural subjects, but both enjoyed strong contrasts of light and dark. Meryon later claimed that his long-term aim in learning printmaking was to participate in illustrating an account, either the official one or his own, of the voyage of the Rhin.

Meryon joined Bléry's workshop, and was soon on excellent terms with him and his family. In September 1848 he joined Mme Bléry and her daughter on a holiday, and sketching tour, in Normandy for several weeks, when M Bléry could not leave Paris. By December he had accepted an invitation to move in to their house. He started to produce etchings, mostly copying landscape and animal paintings, or other prints, that allowed him to develop his technique, and could also be sold print-dealers, if only for modest sums.

He entered the studio of the engraver Eugène Bléry, from whom he learnt something of technical matters, and to whom he always remained grateful. Méryon had no money, and was too proud to ask help from his family. He was forced to earn a living by doing work that was mechanical and irksome. Among learners' work, done for his own advantage, are to be counted some studies after the Dutch etchers such as Zeeman and Adriaen van de Velde. Having proved himself a skilled copyist, he began doing original work, notably a series of etchings which are the greatest embodiments of his greatest conceptions—the series called "Eaux-fortes sur Paris." These plates, executed from 1850 to 1854, are never found as a set and were never expressly published as such, but they nonetheless constituted in Méryon's mind an harmonious series.

== Mature work ==
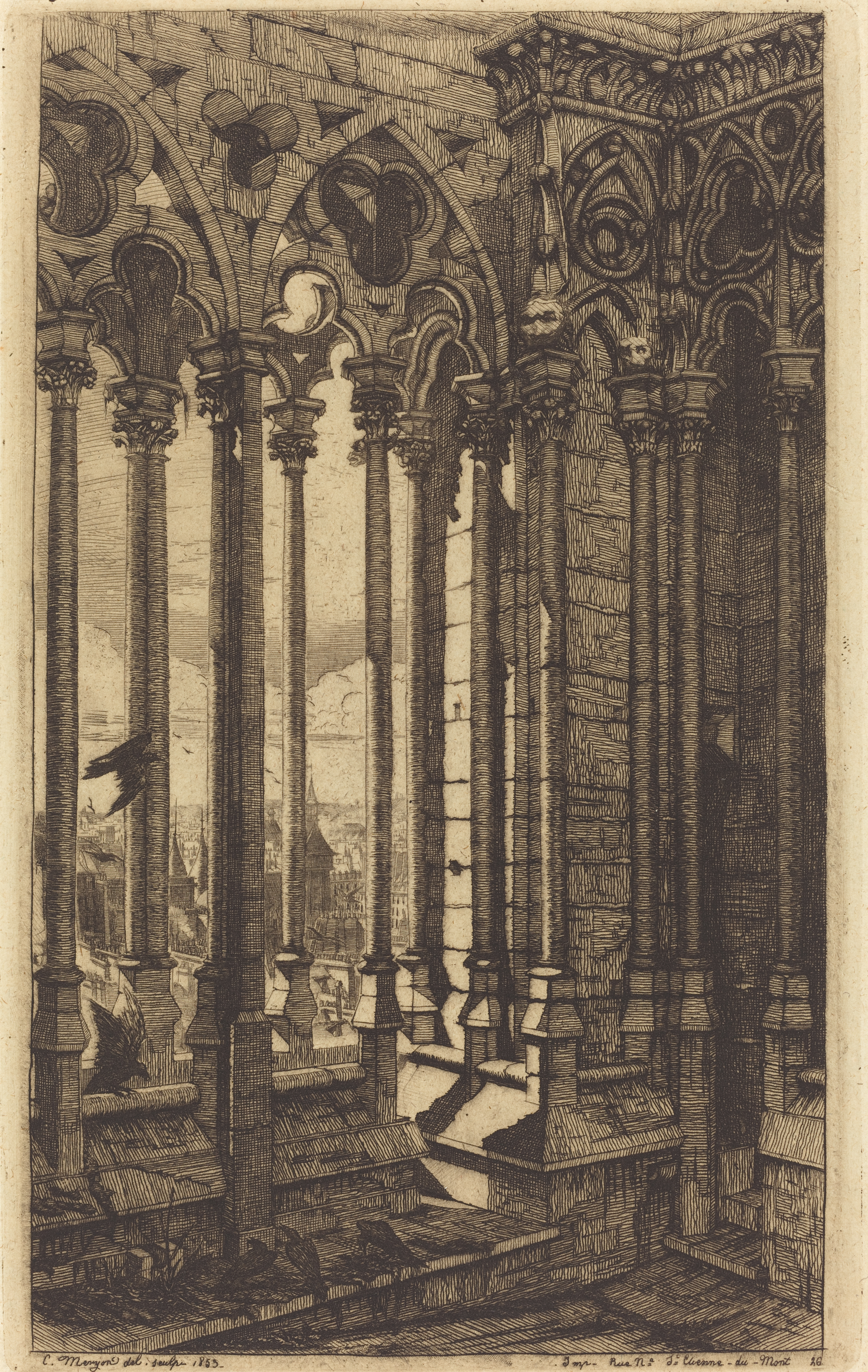
La Galerie de Nôtre-Dame in Paris (1853), 274 × 161 mm

Besides the twenty-two etchings "sur Paris", Meryon did seventy-two etchings of one sort and another ninety-four in all being catalogued in Frederick Wedmore's Méryon and Méryon's Paris; but these include the works of his apprenticeship and of his decline, adroit copies in which his best success was in the sinking of his own individuality, and more or less dull portraits. Yet among the seventy-two prints outside his professed series there are at least a dozen famous ones. Three or four beautiful etchings of Paris do not belong to the series at all. Two or three others are devoted to the illustration of Bourges, a city in which the old wooden houses were as attractive to him for their own sakes as were the stonebuilt monuments of Paris. Generally it was when Paris engaged him that he succeeded the most. He would have done more work if the material difficulties of his life had not pressed upon him and shortened his days.

He was a bachelor, yet almost as constantly occupied with love as with work. The depth of his imagination and the surprising mastery which he achieved almost from the beginning in the technicalities of his craft were appreciated only by a few artists, critics and connoisseurs, and he could not sell his etchings or could sell them only for about lod. apiece. Disappointment told upon him, and, frugal as was his way of life, poverty must have affected him. He became subject to hallucinations. Enemies, he said, waited for him at the corners of the streets; his few friends robbed him or owed him that which they would never pay. A few years after the completion of his Paris series he was placed in the asylum at Charenton. Briefly restored to health, he came out and did a little more work, but at bottom he was exhausted. In 1867 he returned to his asylum, and died there in 1868. In middle age, just before he was confined, he associated with Félix Bracquemond and Léopold Flameng, skilled practitioners of etching. The best portrait we have of him is one by Bracquemond under which the sitter wrote that it represented "the sombre Méryon with the grotesque visage."

There are twenty-two pieces in the Eaux-fortes sur Paris, of which ten are designated as a headpiece, tailpiece, or running commentary on another plate.

Méryon's epic work was coloured strongly by his personal sentiment, and affected occasionally by current events. In more than one case, for instance, he hurried with particular affection to etch his impression of some old-world building which was on the point of destruction, as Napoleon III tore down buildings to reconstruct Paris with wide boulevards. Nearly every etching in the series reveals technical skill, but even the technical skill is exercised most enthusiastically in those etchings which have the advantage of impressive subjects, and which the collector willingly cherishes for their mysterious suggestiveness or for their pure beauty.

Méryon also taught; among his pupils was the etcher Gabrielle-Marie Niel.

== Style ==
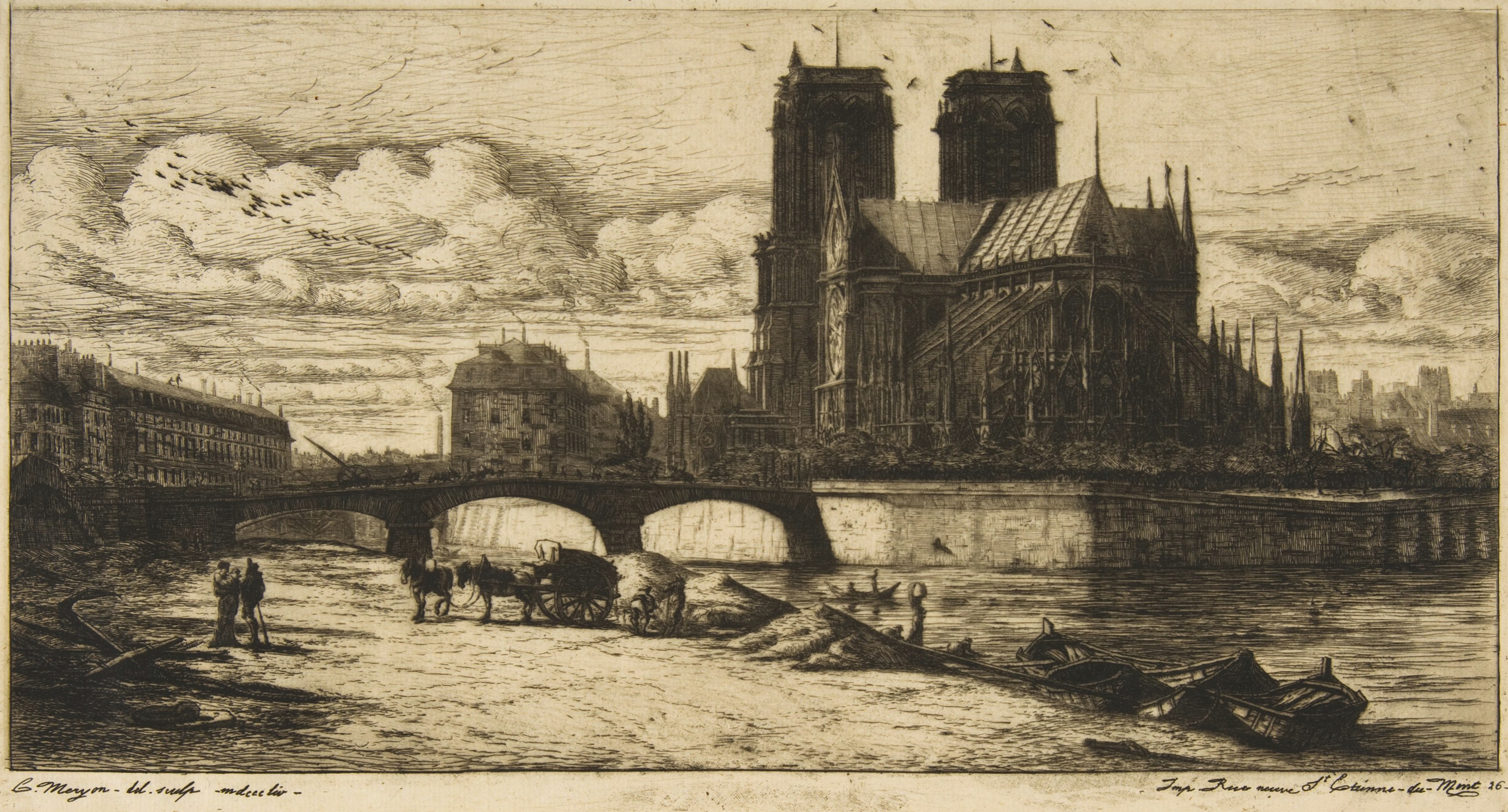
Abside de Notre Dame, 1854, fourth state of nine.

The Abside de Notre Dame is held by some to be Méryon's masterpiece. Light and shade are used in the great fabric of the church, seen over the spaces of the river. As a draughtsman of architecture, Méryon.

Generally speaking, his figures are, as regards draughtsmanship, "landscape-painter's figures." They are seen then to be in accord with the sentiment of the scene. Sometimes, as in the case of La Morgue, it is they who tell the story of the picture. Sometimes, as in the case of La Rue des Mauvais Garçons—with the two passing women bent together in secret converse—they at least suggest it. And sometimes, as in L'Arche du Pont Notre Dame, it is their expressive gesture and eager action that give vitality and animation to the scene.

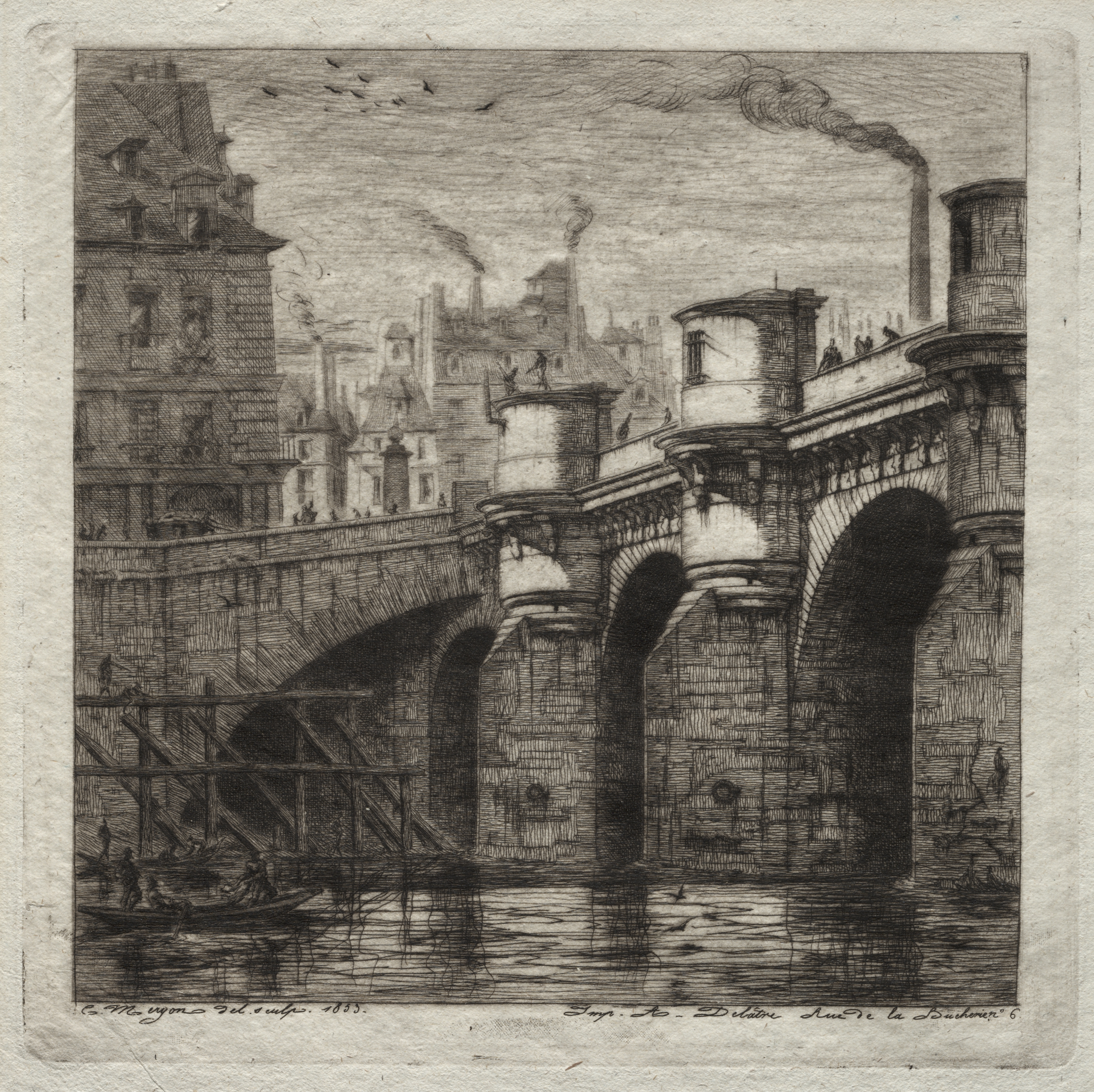
Le Pont Neuf, 1853

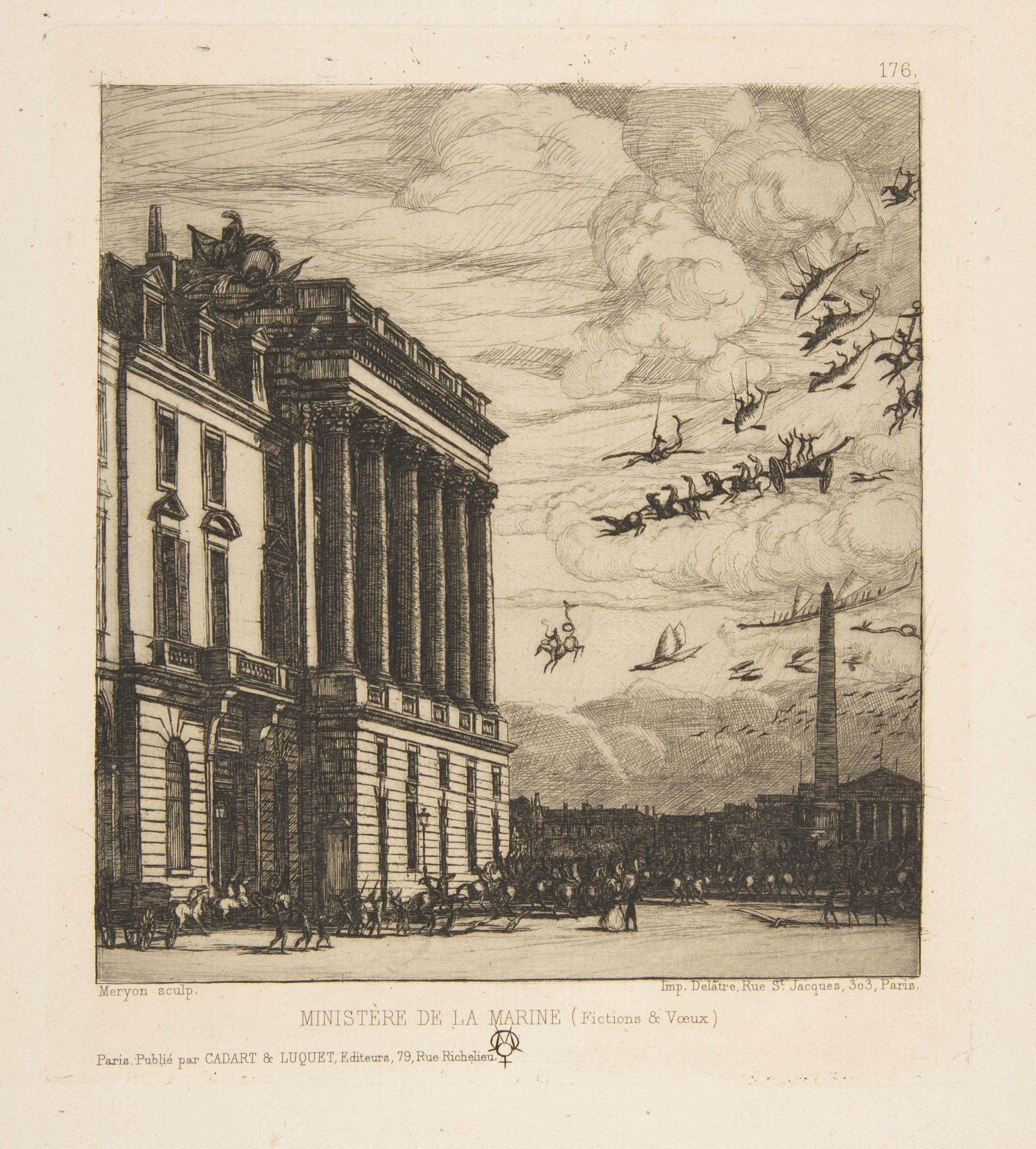
Le Ministere de la Marine ("The Admiralty"), the last Paris scene, 1865

In his technique, Méryon experimented variously in his brief career, and at times within individual works. In two different impressions of his Paris view La Pompe Notre Dame de Paris (1852) he could employ crisp lines through a well wiped plate without surface tone, or leave softer edges and richer darks by ample surface tone. His aesthetics were often dictated by his paper, of which he endeavored to acquire the finest available. His more defined works he printed on 'Hudelist' paper, from a mill in Hallines in the North of France, which had the uniform, smooth quality ideal for sharp images. His more gauzy works, by contrast, were printed on a softer, felt-like Morel Lavenere paper produced in Glaignes, which was highly absorbent—and pale green, which Méryon in his colour blindness would not have perceived as the typical viewer. Ultimately, however, his stated preference was for cleanly-wiped, clear prints of a uniform quality, which determination ironically positioned him against the Etching Revival he helped inspire.

== Mental illness ==
As early as his voyage on the Rhin in his naval period, Meryon had displayed behaviours that were initially interpreted as eccentricity, for which there was considerable tolerance in Parisian artistic circles, but later came to be seen by friends as "the beginnings of a dysfunction". By the mid-1850s he had periods of depression when he could do nothing, and developed a conviction that he was being persecuted by Emperor Napoleon III; he traced this to "tactless words on the abuse of force" which he had inscribed in 1846 in the visitor's book at Longwood, Saint Helena, where Napoleon I had died. He thought several other artists who had died had been done away with by the government, probably by poison.

He developed an obsession with a very young girl in the neighbourhood, Louise Neveu, who lived next door to him between at least 1851 and 1856. His "aggressive and persistent but unsuccessful courting" was an attempt to marry her, for which he negotiated with her parents through a friend. Her father "thought him potentially violent", and he later "threatened visitors with a pistol". There may have been another young girl, as various accounts mention the daughter of the owner of the restaurant where he usually ate, who was not Neveu. Several accounts mention his obsessive digging-up of the back-garden of the house he was staying, apparently looking for buried bodies.

In 1858 he agreed to admit himself to the leading Charenton asylum, a doctor having certified him as "suffering from a profound disturbance of the mental faculties" on 10 May. Two days later, his initial examination at Charenton assessed him as having "Deep melancholy, ideas of persecution which he considers to be deserved. depressive ideas. he considers himself deeply guilty towards Society." This stay lasted fourteen months until 10 September 1859, by which time he was assessed as improved, including by himself in a later letter.

After seven years, during which both his life and his art had shown signs that his condition had remained with him to some degree, he was readmitted to Charenton for the final time on 10 October 1866. Their records of "regular monthly assessments offer a story of persistent violent outbursts, intense melancholy, recurrent hallucinations and the conviction that even his old friends were conspiring against him". Although he was sometimes well enough to be taken out for trips, his condition deteriorated, he stopped eating, and he died in Charenton on 14 February 1868.

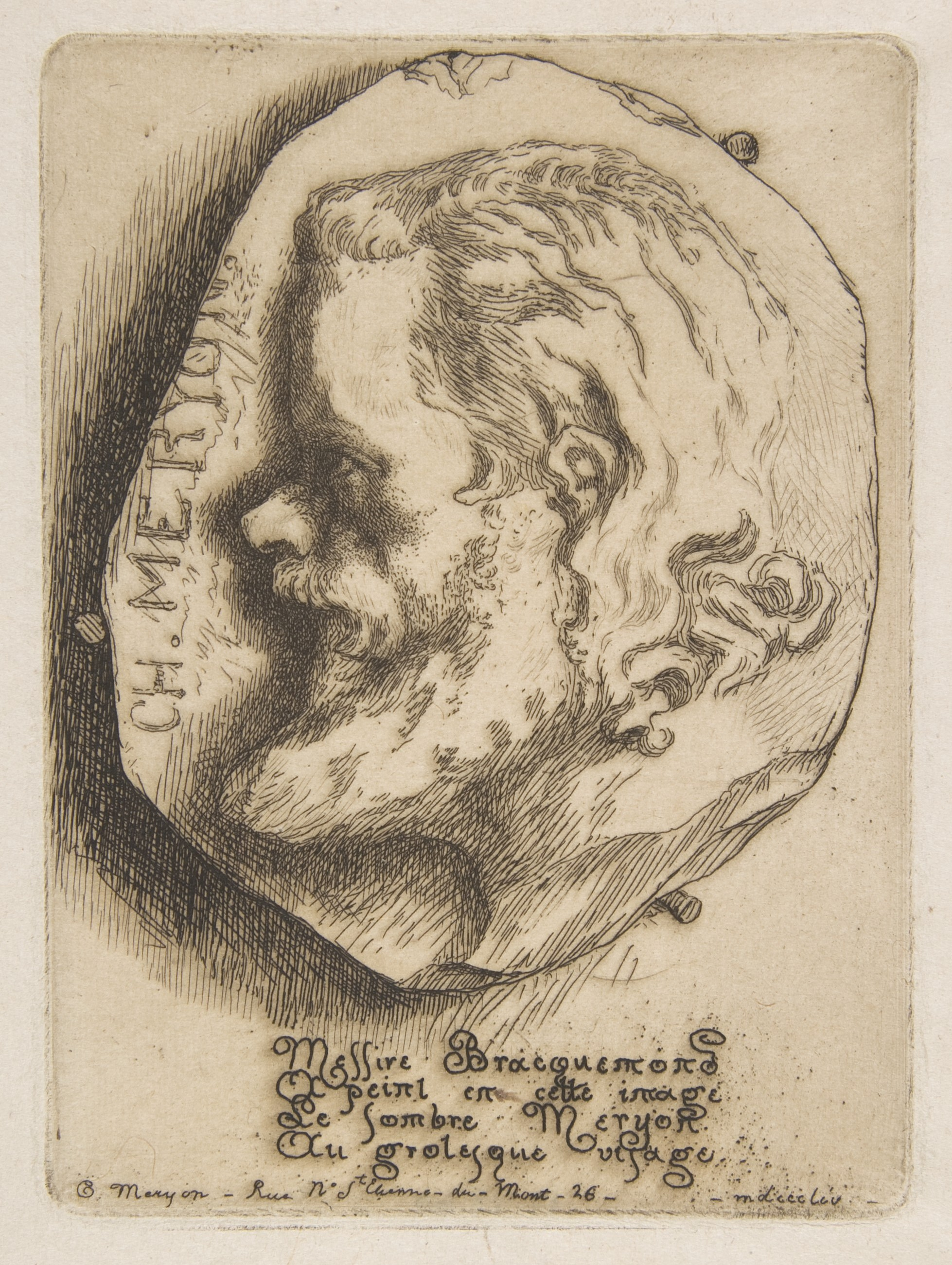
Portrait of Charles Meryon, etching by Félix Bracquemond, 1854, the inscribed text ending "the grotesque face of the sombre Meryon" added by Meryon

Retrospective diagnoses assess Meryon's behavior exhibiting symptoms of schizophrenia.

== Value of Meryon's prints ==
=== To 1911 ===
It is worthwhile to note the extraordinary enhancement in the value of Méryon's prints. Probably of no other artist of genius, not even of Whistler, could there be cited within the same period a rise in prices of at all the same proportion. Thus the first state of the "Stryge" – that "with the verses" – selling under the hammer in 1873 for £5, sold again under the hammer in 1905 for £100. The first state of the "Galerie de Notre Dame" – selling in 1873 for £5 and at M. Wasset's sale in 1880 for £11, fetched in 1905, £52. A "Tour de l'Horloge," which two or three years after it was first issued sold for half a crown, in May 1903 fetched f70. A first state (Wedmore's, not of course M. Delteil's "first state," which, like nearly all his first states, is in fact a trial proof) of the "Saint Étienne du Mont," realizing about £2 at M. Burty's sale in 1876, realized £60 at a sale in May 1906. The second state of the "Morgue" (Wedmore) sold in 1905 for £65; and Wedmore's second of the "Abside," which used to sell throughout the seventies for £4 or £5, reached in November 1906 more than £200. At no period have even Dürers or Rembrandts risen so swiftly and steadily.

=== Modern ===
Though while alive he sold prints for francs, in 2014 prints were for sale under US$1000. Four of the Paris prints sold at Christie's in London for £4,375 in 2009, but an especially good impression of one of these had fetched £11,500 in 1998. In 2018 Meryon's etchings fetch on the market (in the UK) from between £1,500 to £7,500 GBP.

== Gallery of etchings ==
Etchings of Paris:

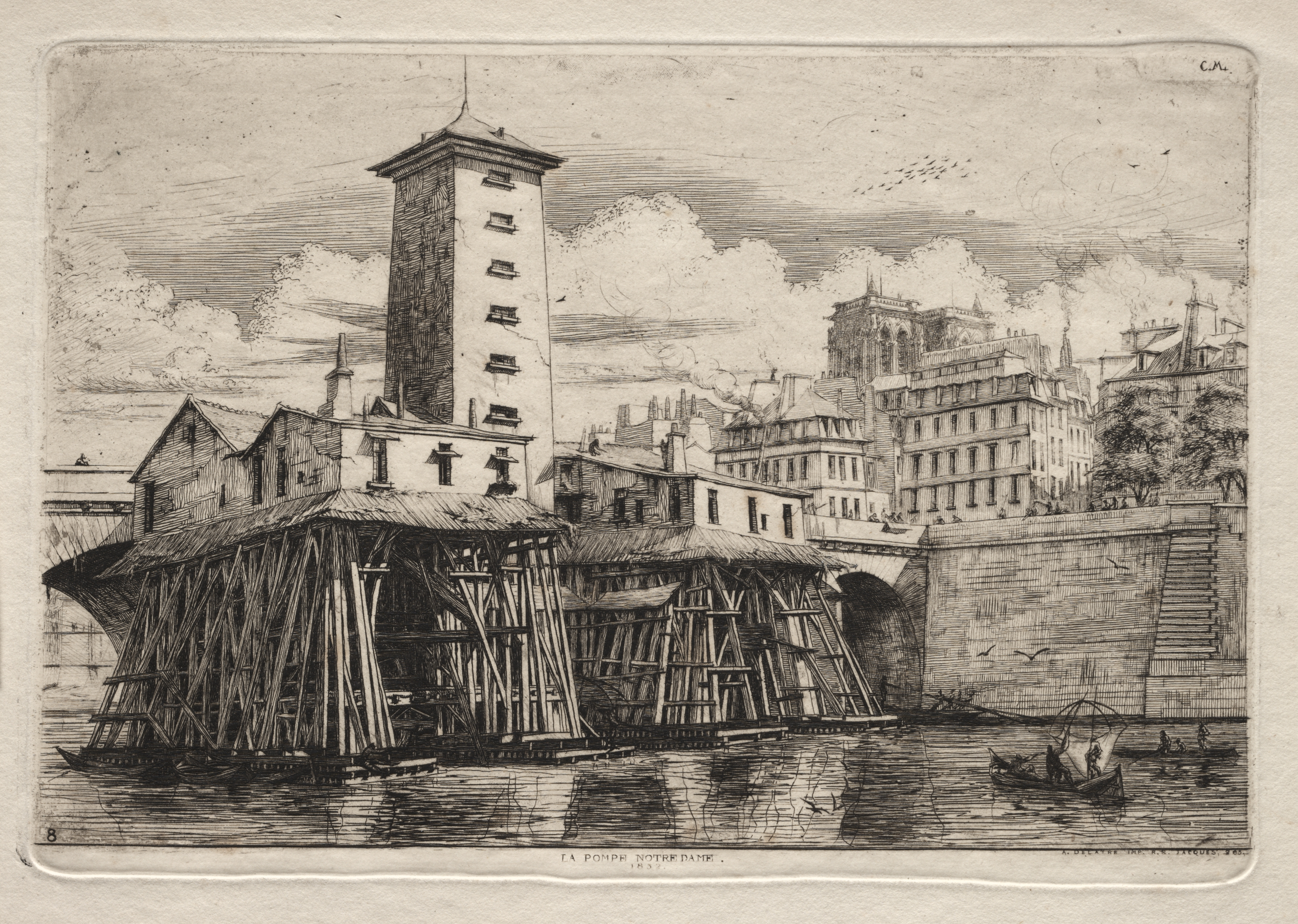
La Pompe Notre Dame ("The Notre Dame Pump"), 1852

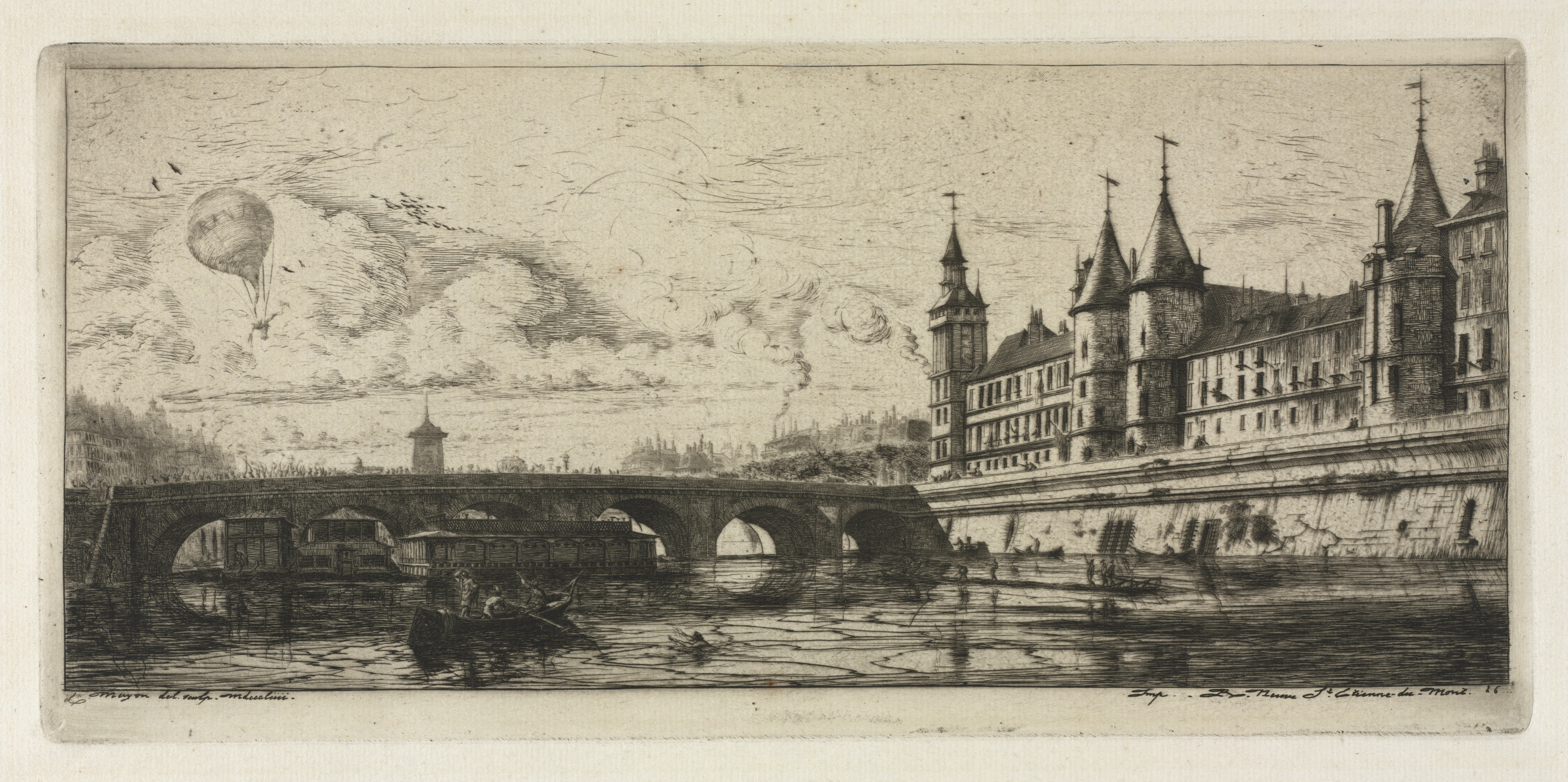
Le Pont-au-Change (The Exchange Bridge), 1854

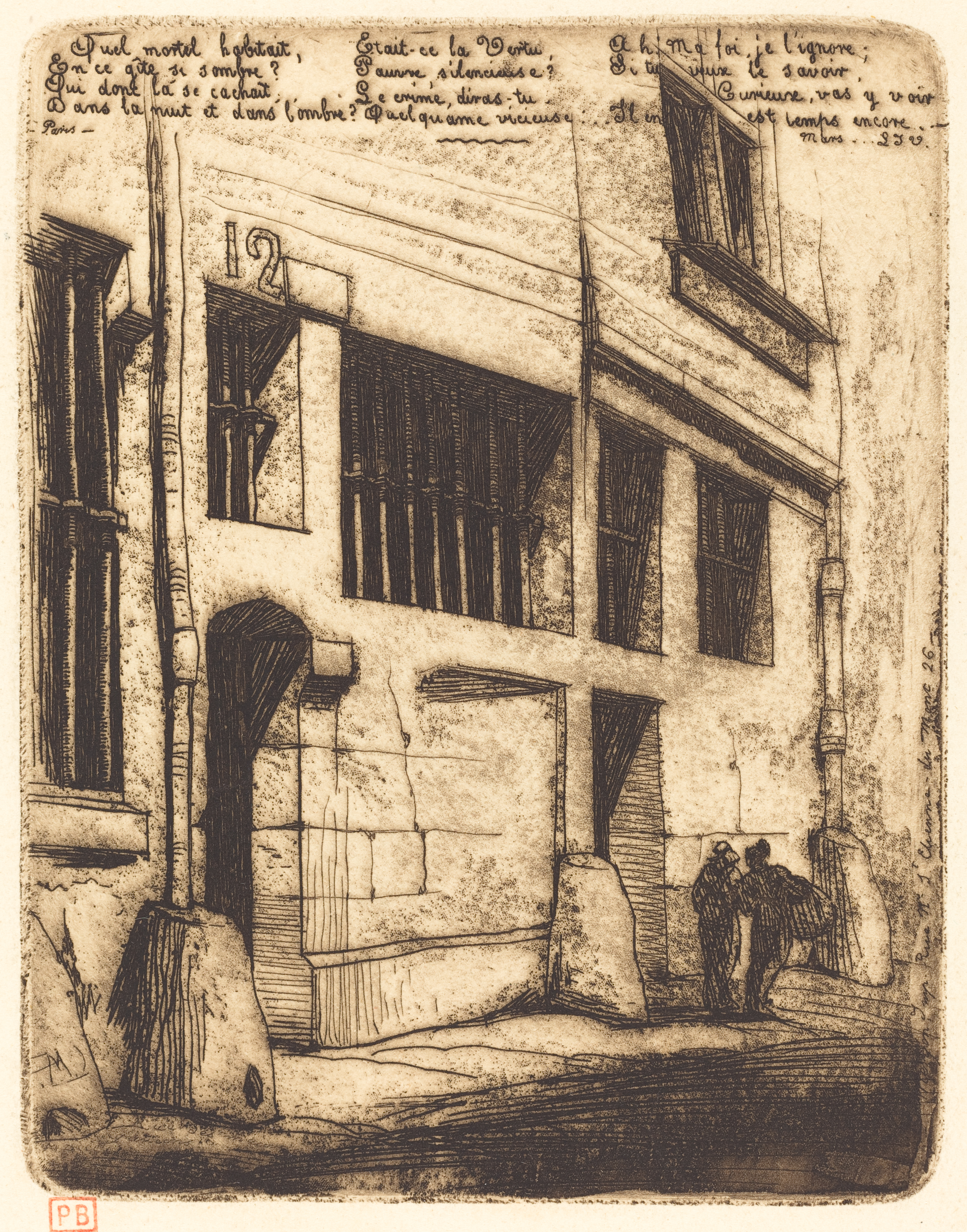
La Rue des Mauvais Garçons ("The Street of the Bad Boys"), 1854

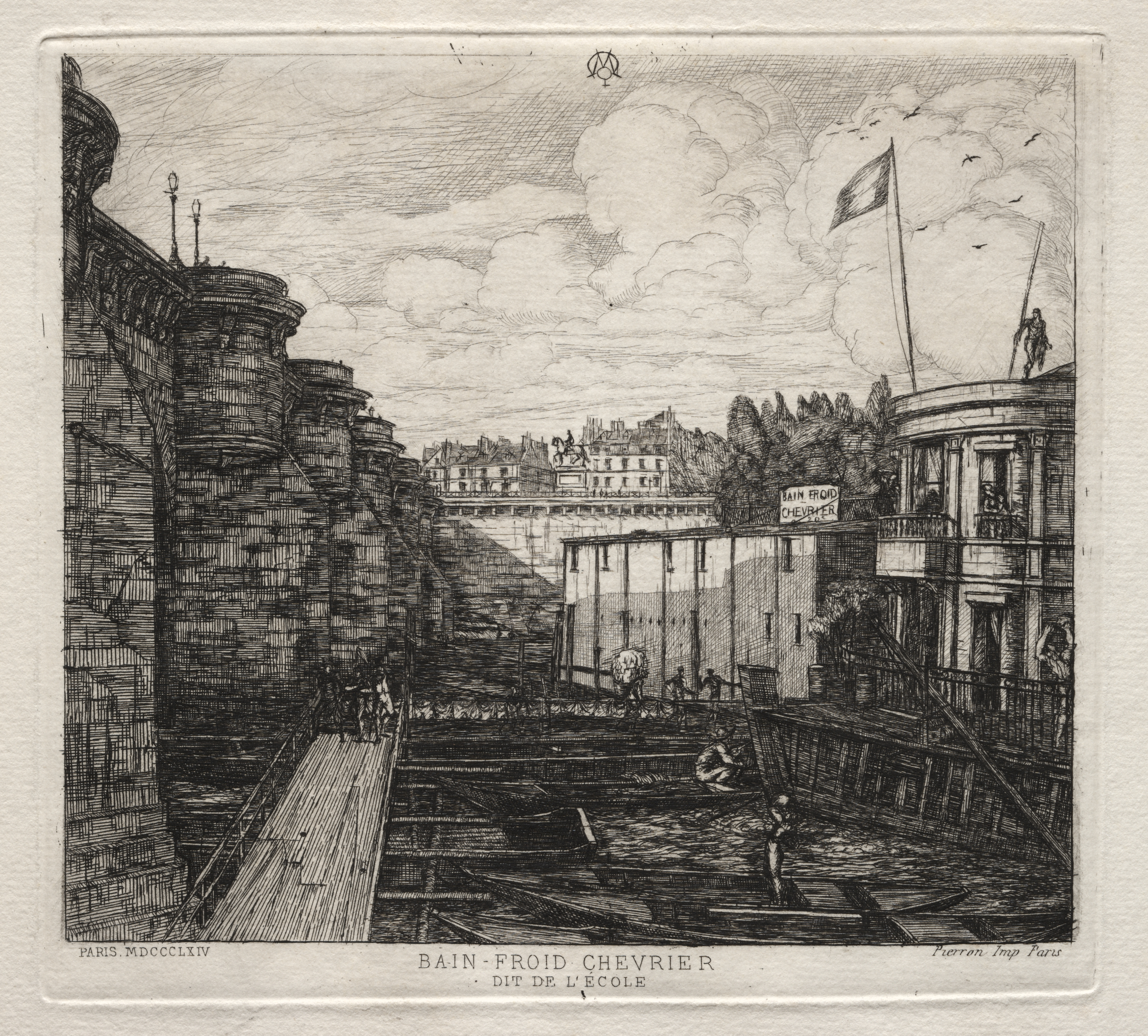
Chevrier's Cold Bath Establishment, 1864
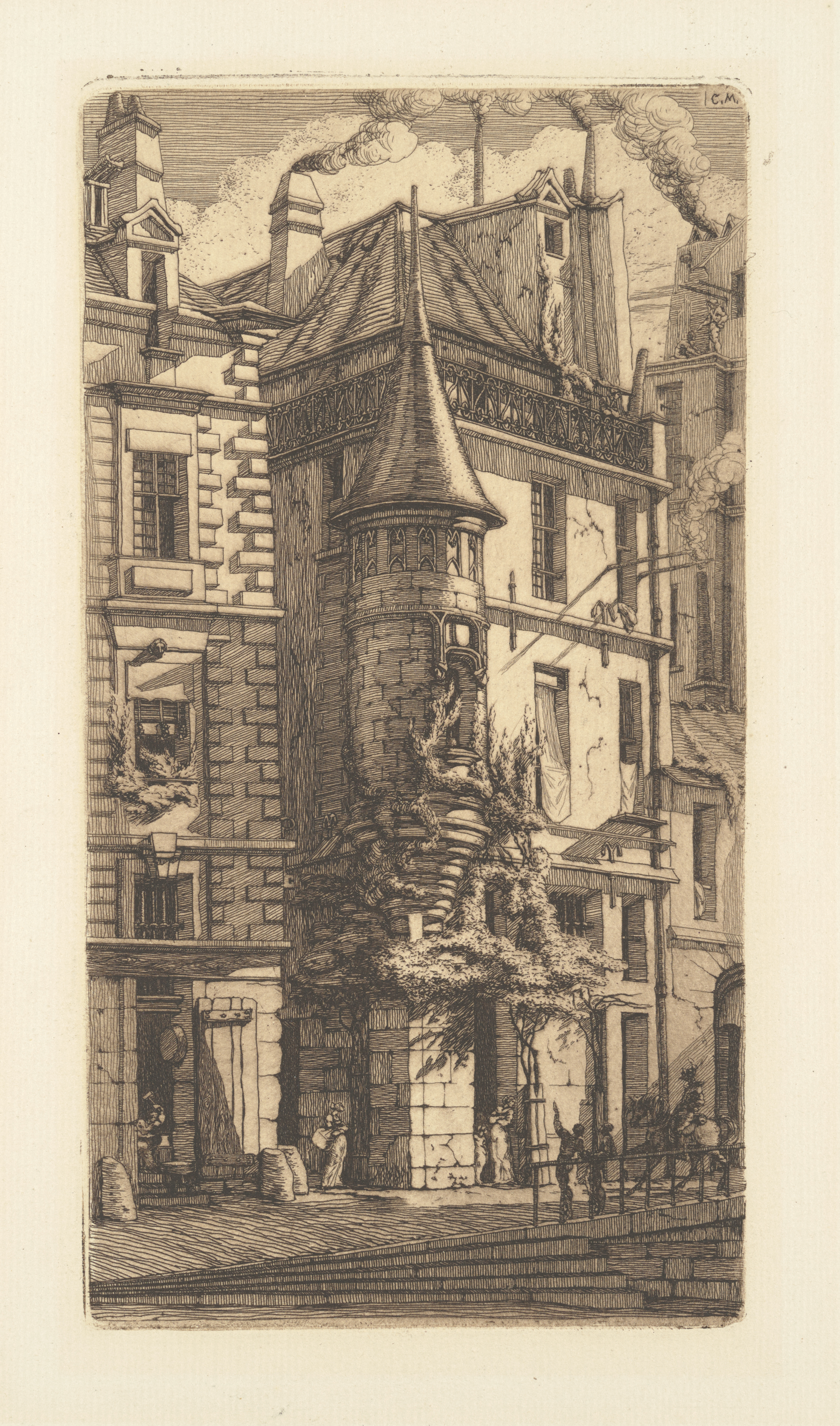
Tourelle, Rue de la Tixeranderie (House with a Turret, Rue de la Tixeranderie), 1852

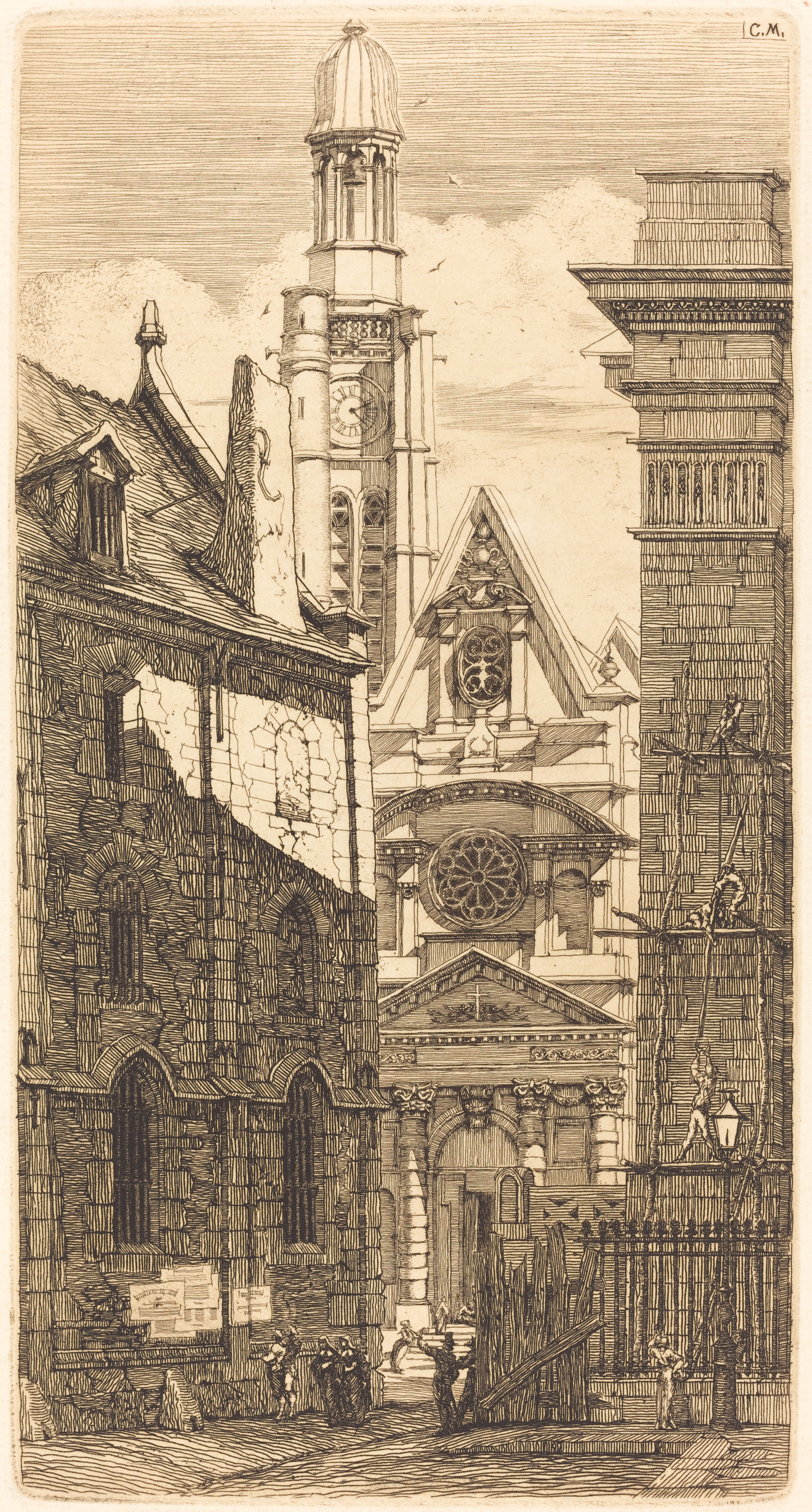
Saint-Etienne-du-Mont, 1852

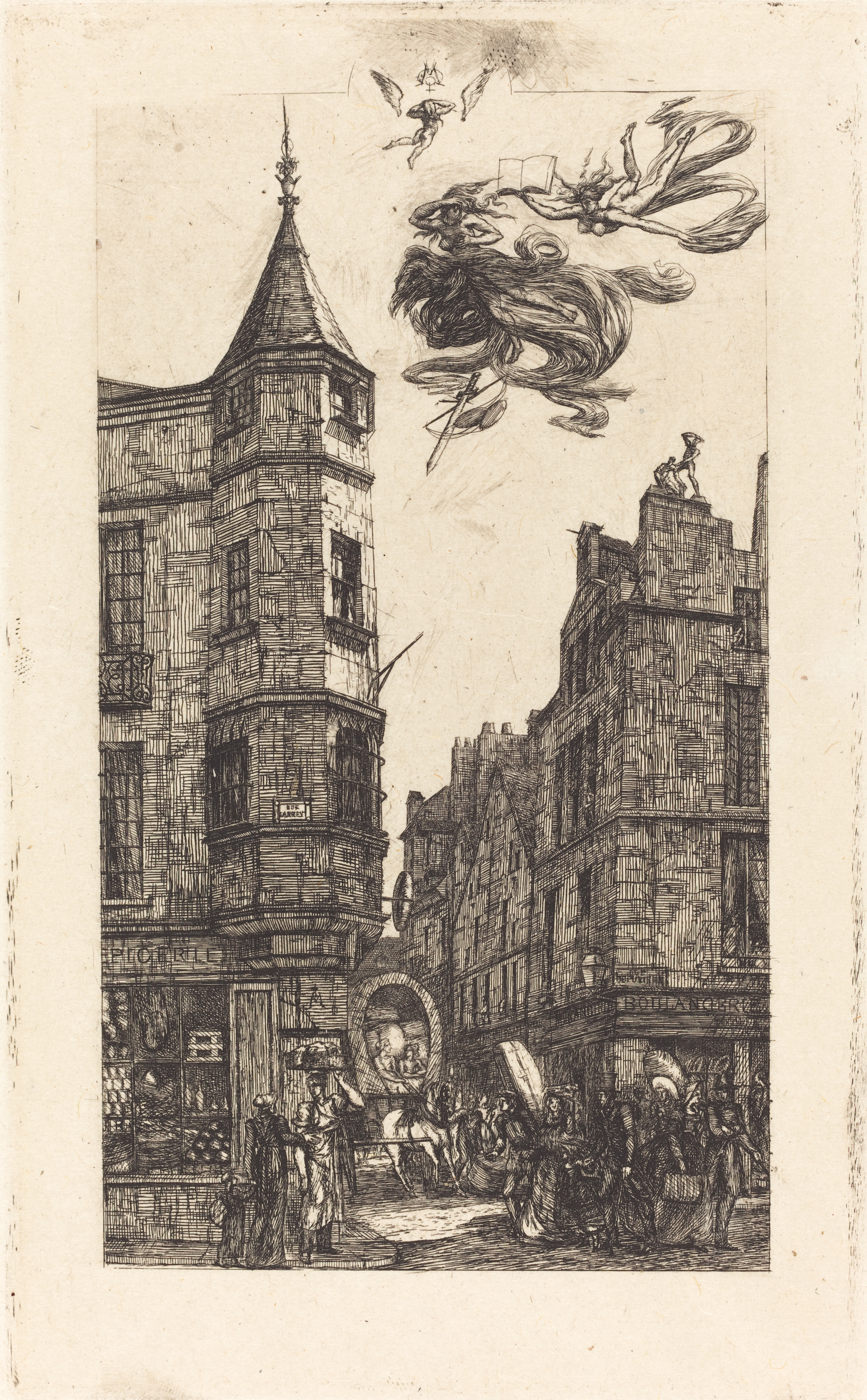
Tourelle, Rue de l'École de Médecine, 22, Paris (House with a Turret, No. 22, Street of the School of Medecine, Paris), 1861. The figures in the sky were added in later states.

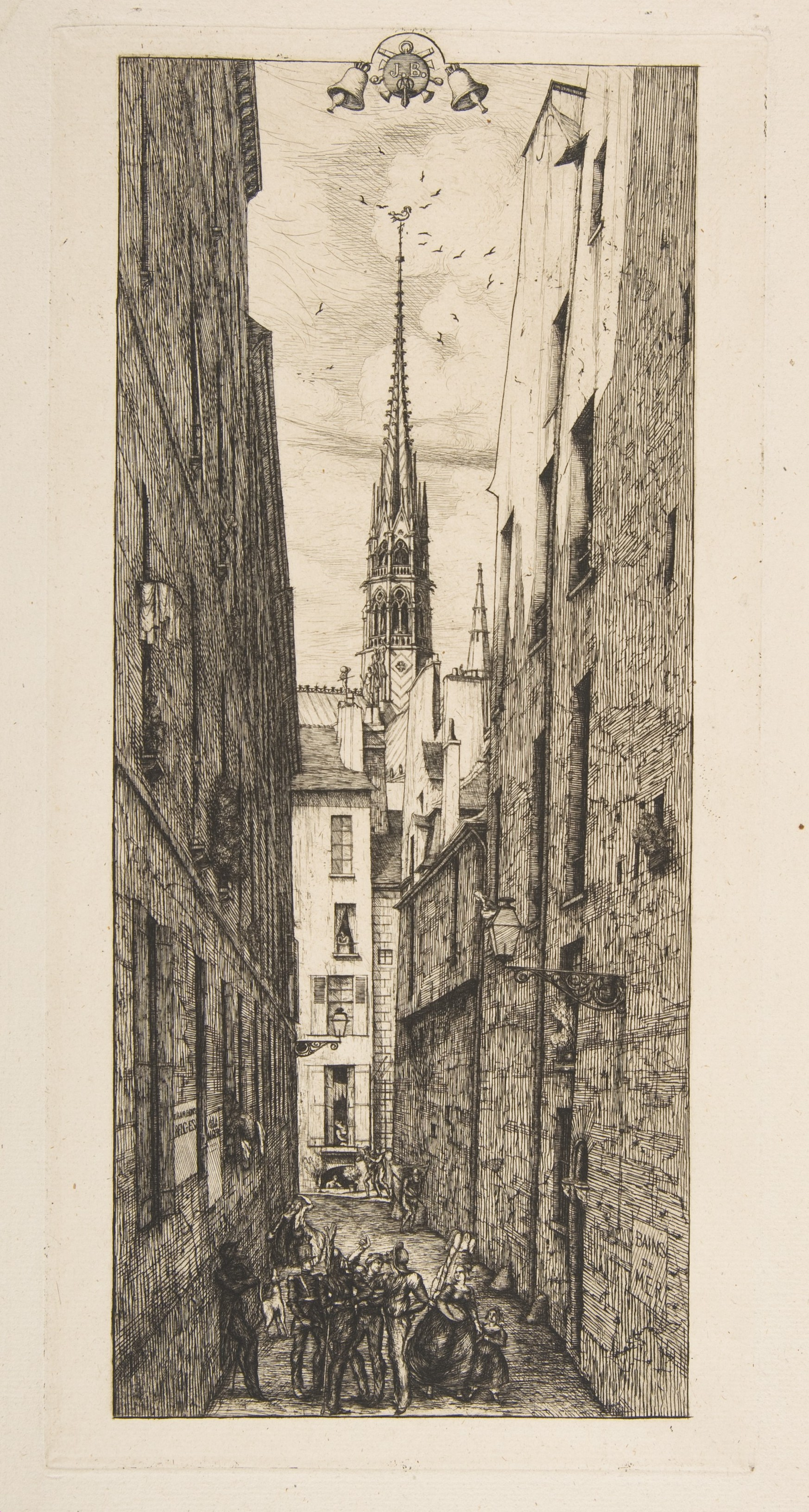
La Rue des Chantres, 1862
