= Frederick Wedmore =

British art critic and man of letters

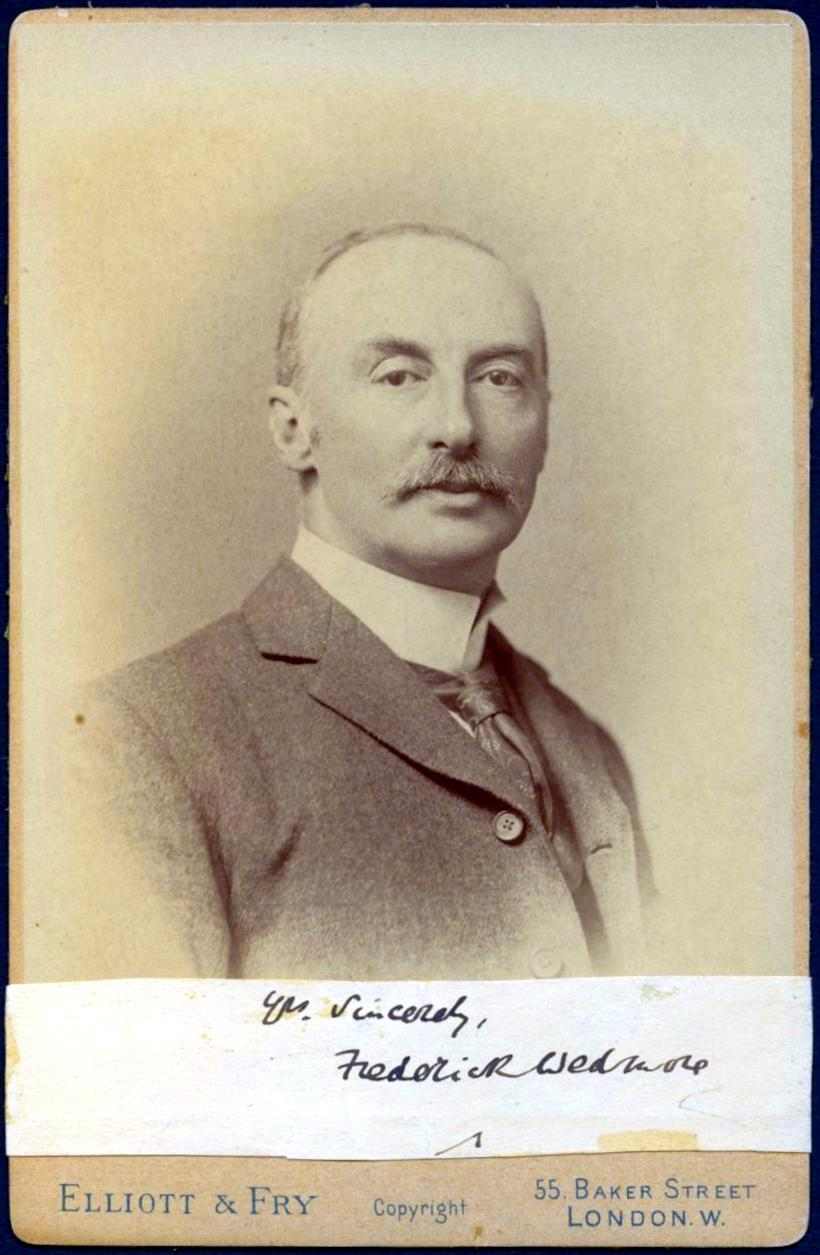
Frederick Wedmore

Frederick Wedmore (9 July 1844 – 25 February 1921) was a British art critic and man of letters.

Wedmore was born at Richmond Hill, Clifton, the eldest son of Thomas Wedmore of Druids Stoke, Stoke Bishop. His family were Quakers, and he was educated at a Quaker private school and then in Lausanne and Paris. After a short experience of journalism in Bristol he came to London in 1868, and began to write for The Spectator. His early works included two novels, but the best examples of his prose are perhaps to be found in his volumes of short stories, Pastorals of France (1877), Renunciations (1893), Orgeas and Miradou (1896), reprinted in 1905 as A Dream of Provence.

In 1900 he published another novel, The Collapse of the Penitent. As early as 1878 he had begun a long connection with the London Standard as art critic. He began his studies on etching with a noteworthy paper in The Nineteenth Century (1877–1878) on the etchings of Charles Meryon. This was followed by The Four Masters of Etching (1883), with original etchings by Sir FS Haden, Jules Jacquemart, JM Whistler, and Alphonse Legros; Etching in England (1895); an English edition (1894) of E Michel's Rembrandt: His Life, His Works, and His Time In Two Volumes; and a study and a catalogue of Whistler's Etchings (1886, 2nd edition 1899). His other works include Studies in English Art (2 vols., 1876–80), The Masters of Genre Painting (1880), On Books and Arts (1899), English Water Colour (1902), Turner and Ruskin (2 vols., 1900).

He was knighted in 1912. He published that year his Memories, a book of reminiscences, social and literary. He also published Painters and Painting (1913) and a novel, Brenda Walks On (1916). He died at Sevenoaks.

== Family ==
His daughter, Millicent Wedmore (born 1879), herself the author of two volumes of verse, helped him to edit during World War I Poems of the Love and Pride of England.
