= Gabrielle-Marie Niel =

French etcher (1840–1894)

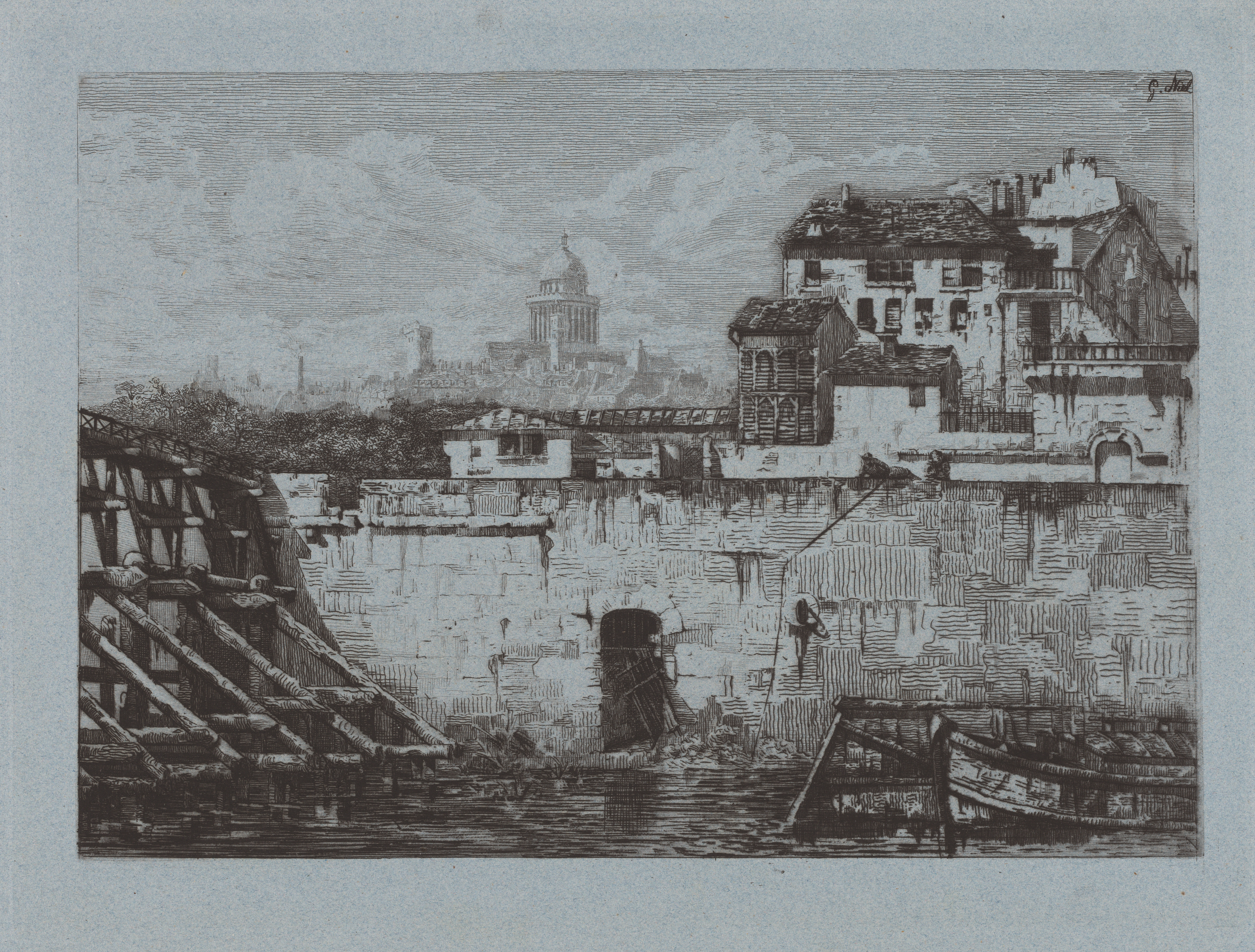
Ruines de l'hôtel de Bretonvilliers, à la Pointe de l'Île Saint-Louis, etching on blue paper, 1875

Gabrielle-Marie Niel (12 May 1831 – 4 April 1919) was a French etcher.

Born in Poligny, Jura, Niel was the daughter of Jules Niel (1800–1872), who was at the time an administrator of the Jura subprefecture. After receiving initial lessons, and advice, from Émile Wattier, a friend of her father's, she studied under Charles Méryon. She is chiefly noted for producing etchings of old Paris and of other cities, as well as images of Italy and Algeria. She first exhibited at the Paris Salon in 1866, and continued to work until sometime after 1875. Her prints show the influence of Meryon in their style. Alfred Cadart published her pictures of Paris and Algeria, while other prints appeared in the journal L'art. She died in Paris. Niel is represented in the collections of the Fine Arts Museums of San Francisco with three etchings, including two impressions of Ruines de l'hôtel de Bretonvilliers, à la Pointe de l'Île Saint-Louis. Another example of this etching is currently owned by the National Gallery of Art.

Niel died in Paris on 4 April 1919 and was buried at Père Lachaise Cemetery a few days later, on 7 April.
