= Charles Lewis Meryon =

English physician

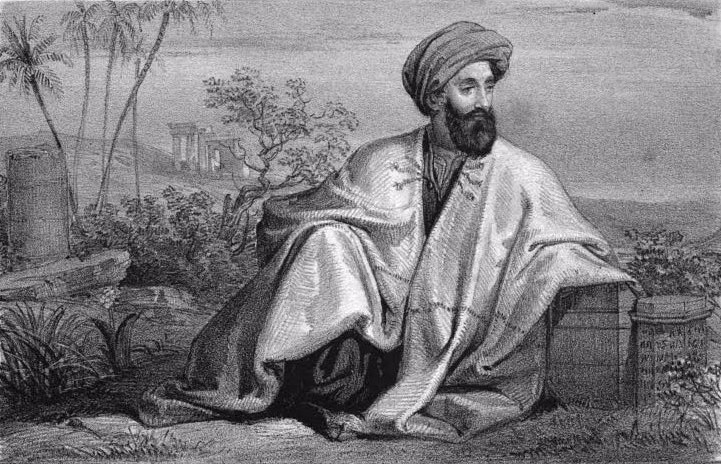
Charles Lewis Meryon in Bedouin dress

Charles Lewis Meryon (27 June 1783 – 11 September 1877) was an English physician and biographer.

== Life ==
The son of Lewis Meryon of Rye, Sussex, from a Huguenot background, he was born on 27 June 1783. He was educated at Merchant Taylors' School, from 1796 to 1802. Obtaining a Stuart's exhibition to St John's College, Oxford, he matriculated there on 29 March 1803, and graduated B.A. 1806, M.A. 1809, M.B. and M.D. 1817. He studied medicine at St. Thomas's Hospital under Henry Cline.

With Cline's recommendation, Meryon was in 1810 taken on by the eccentric Lady Hester Stanhope, as her medical attendant, on a voyage to Sicily and the Near East. He was with her during her seven years' wanderings, saw her finally settled on Mount Lebanon, and then returned to England to take his medical degrees. Meryon revisited Syria at Lady Hester's request in 1819, and found that she had adopted local customs. A clash with one of her medical men ended his stay.

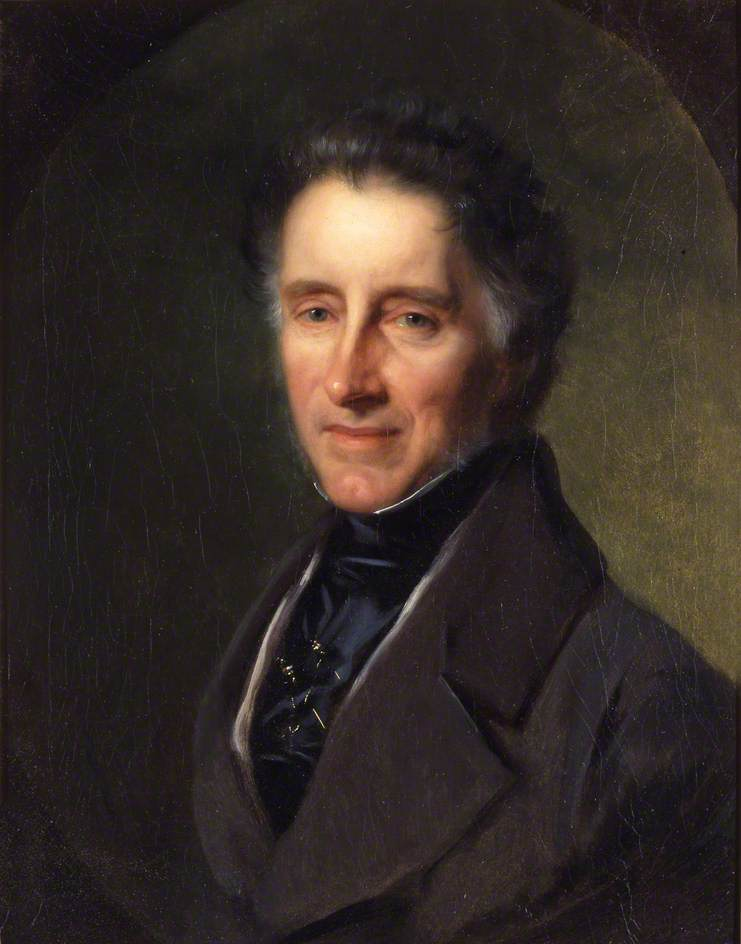
Charles Lewis Meryon, portrait by Arminius Mayer

Meryon was admitted a candidate of the Royal College of Physicians on 26 June 1820, and a fellow on 25 June 1821. Shortly afterwards he became domestic physician to Sir Gilbert Heathcote, 4th Baronet, but in 1827, at the request of Lady Hester Stanhope, he started again for Syria, with his wife and family. They were attacked and robbed en route by a pirate, and returned to Livorno, where they stayed for a time. In November 1830 they sailed from Marseille, and arrived at Mount Lebanon about 15 December.

Lady Hester had a large household, with about 30 servants, and over time became house-bound. She would talk to Meryon for hours on end, into the night. She moved to Joun, and died in 1839. After disagreements, mainly centred on his wife, Meryon left Mount Lebanon in April 1831. He paid Lady Hester a fourth and last visit between July 1837 and August 1838.

Settling in London, Meryon died there on 11 September 1877, aged 94.

== Works ==
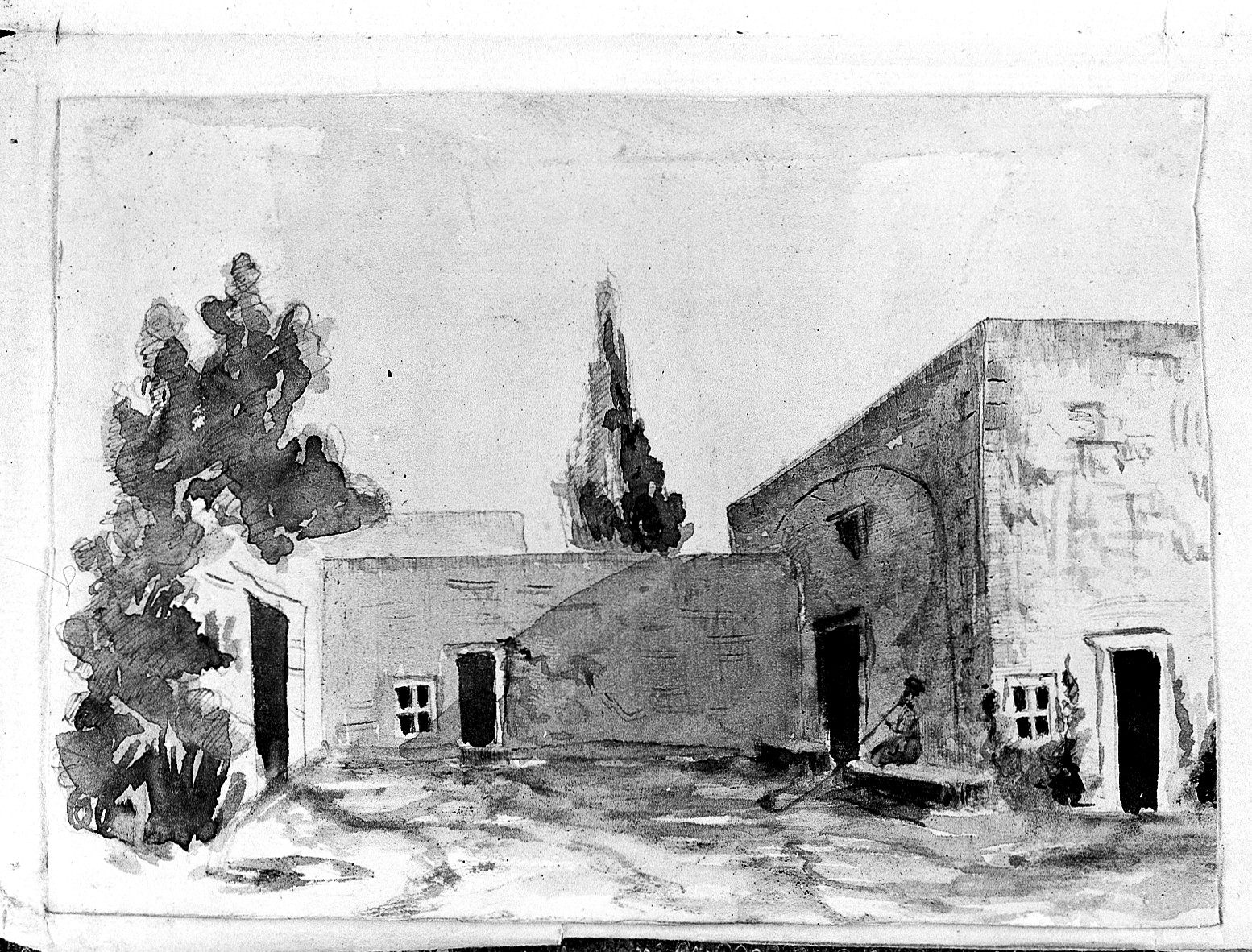
Courtyard, illustration from Travels of Lady Hester Stanhope, vol. 3

Meryon published in London Memoirs of the Lady Hester Stanhope, as related by herself in Conversations with her Physician, (1845, 3 vols.) They form, in effect, a sequel to his work of the following year, Travels of Lady Hester Stanhope, forming the completion of her Memoirs narrated by her Physician (1846, 3 vols. London).

The 1860 poem The Origin of Rome and of the Papacy, by "Deuteros Whistlecraft", is attributed to Meryon. It is a translation from Giovanni Battista Casti.

== Family ==
Meryon had a son with Narcisse Chaspoux, a French ballet dancer, the artist Charles Méryon. Edward Meryon M.D. was a nephew. Charles Meryon had a daughter Eugenia and a son John by his wife, as mentioned in Lady Stanhope's memoirs.
