= L'Estampe Moderne =

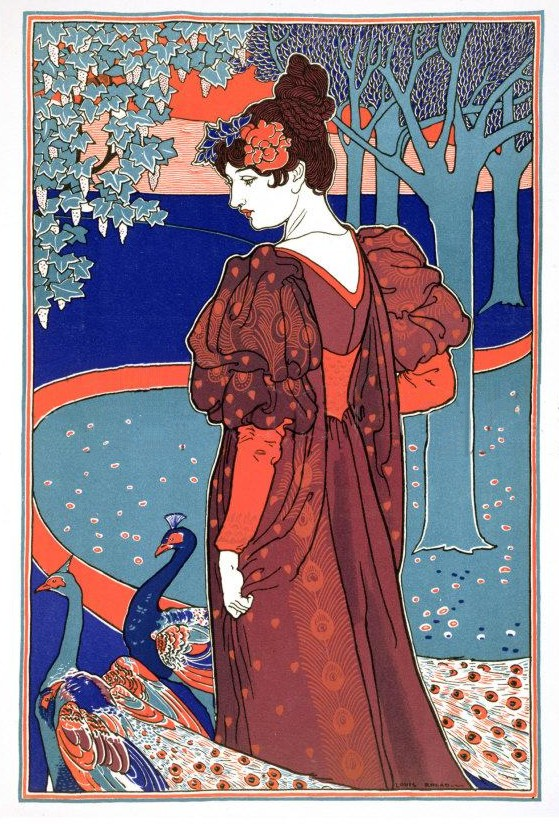
Woman with Peacocks by Louis Rhead

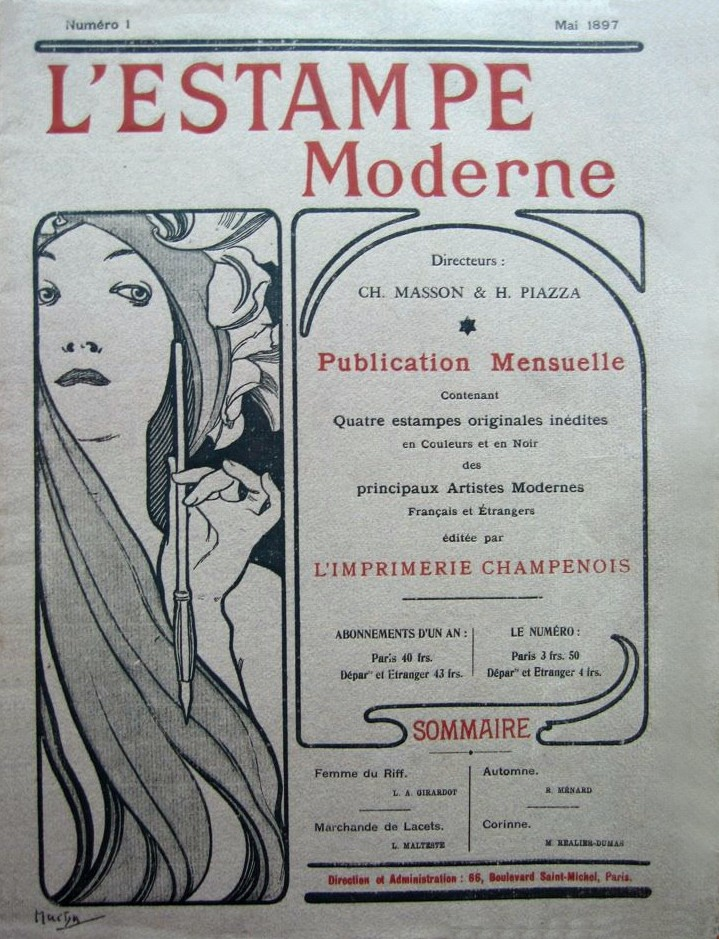
Cover of first folio

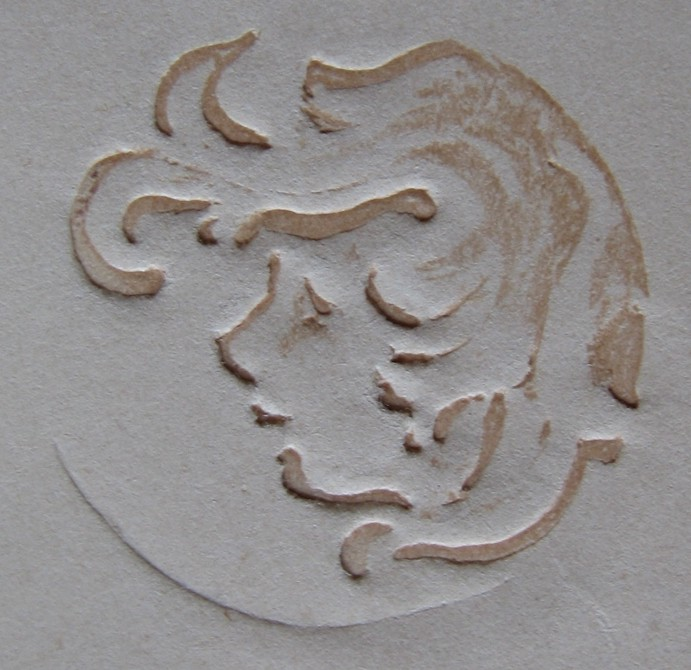
Blindstamp of L'Estampe Moderne

L'Estampe Moderne appeared in 1897–99 as a series of 24 monthly fascicles, each of 4 original lithographs, priced at 3 francs 50 centimes and printed by Imprimerie Champenois of Paris. Many accomplished European Art Nouveau painters contributed works to this publication. The richly lithographed prints had as a blindstamp (or embossed device), the imprint of a young woman's profile in the lower right corner. The prints are much sought after in the current art world.

In the 1890s various fascicles of original prints were issued by French publishers. L’épreuve was edited by Maurice Dumont and appeared monthly between December 1894 and December 1895 - L’Estampe originale was a quarterly edited by André Marty between 1893 and 1895 - the original L’estampe moderne was published in five folios between November 1895 and March 1896 edited by Loÿs Delteil - the second L’Estampe Moderne was published monthly between May 1897 and April 1899.

The publication was edited by Charles Masson and H. Piazza. Each issue came in a paper cover bearing an original lithograph by Alphonse Mucha. The publisher offered two extra lithographs a year, the "planches de prime", as an incentive to prospective subscribers. The aim was to promote the art of printmaking by commissioning images from noted Art Nouveau artists, such as Alphonse Mucha, Louis Rhead, Marcel-Lenoir, Henri Boutet, Henri Fantin-Latour, Edward Burne-Jones and Théophile Steinlen.

== Gallery ==
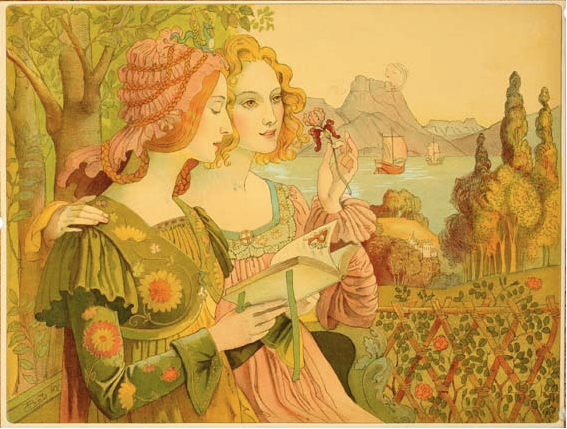
The Golden Legend by Armand Point, 1897

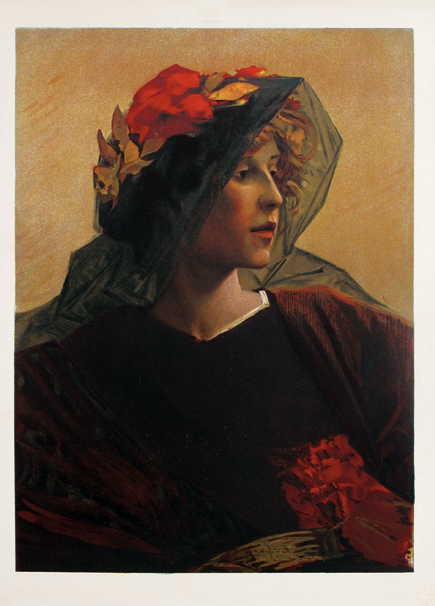
Imperia by Alfred Agache, 1899

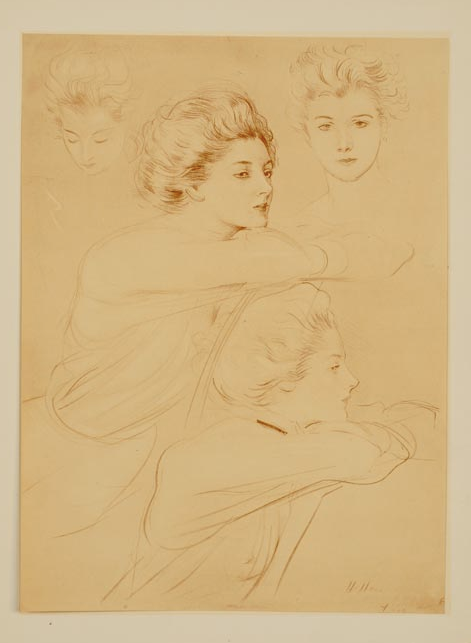
Parisian by Paul César Helleu, 1898

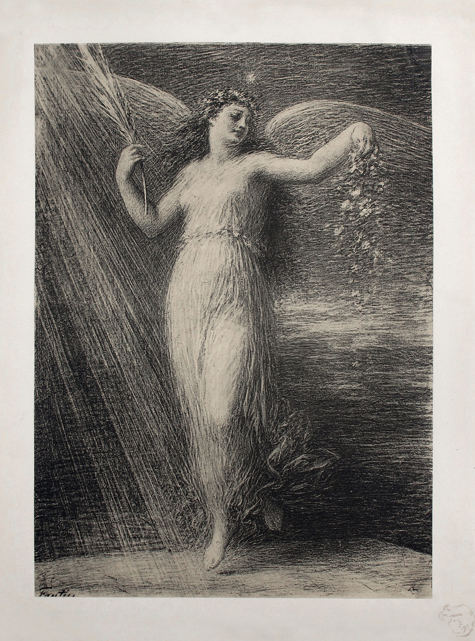
Immortalité by Henri Fantin-Latour, 1897

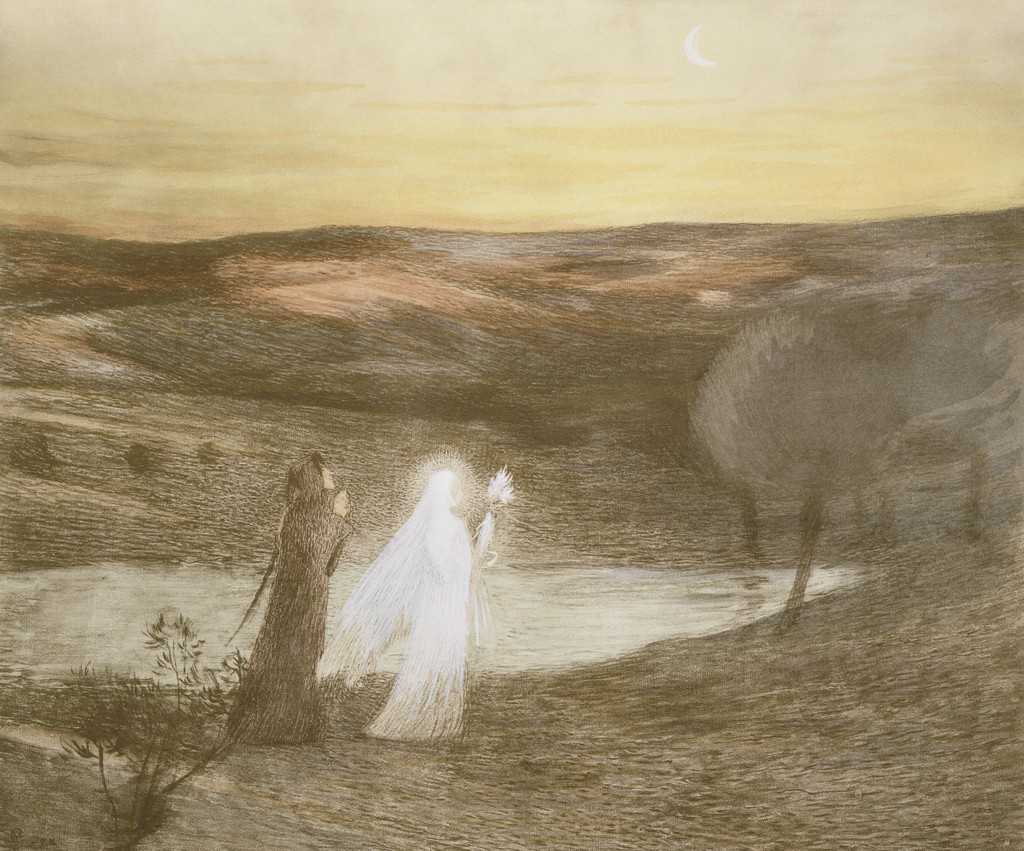
Dante meets Béatrice by Henri-Jean Guillaume Martin, 1898

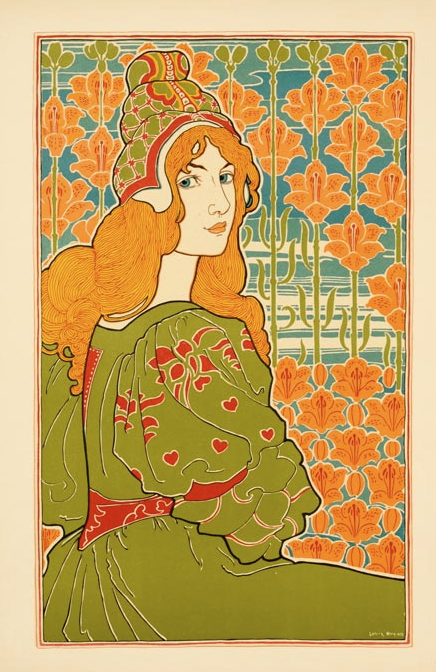
Jane by Louis Rhead, 1897

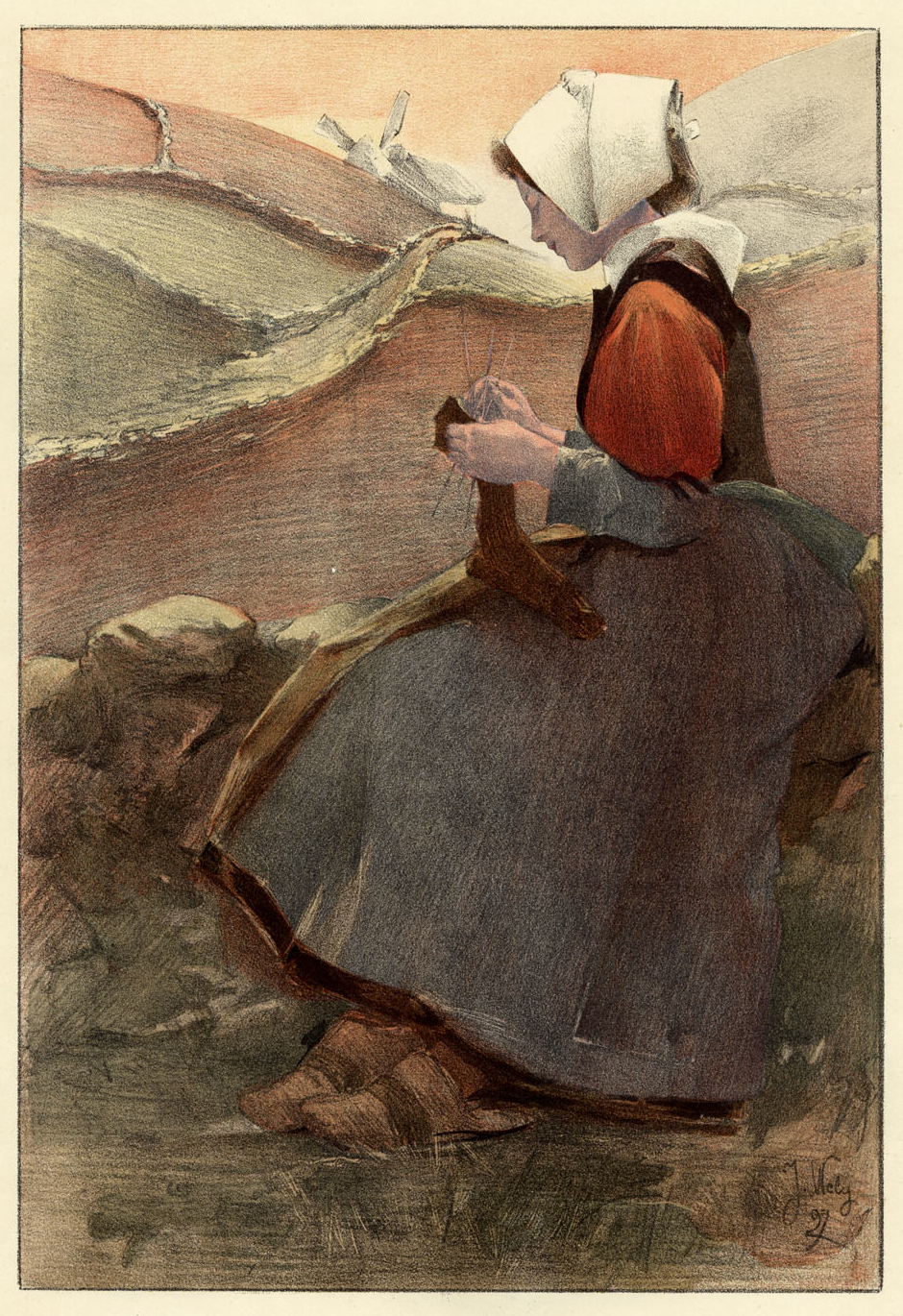
Fleur de lande by Jacques Wely, 1897

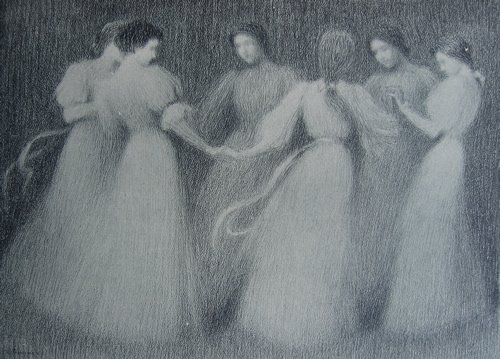
La Ronde by Henri Le Sidaner, 1899
