= Boutet =

Boutet is a French surname. Notable people with the surname include:

- Jacques Marie Boutet (1745–1812), French actor and dramatist
- Nicolas Noel Boutet (1761–1833), French gun and edged weapons manufacturer. Gunmaker to King Louis XVI and Napoleon.
- Henri Boutet (1851–1919), French artist
