= Auguste Herst =

French painter

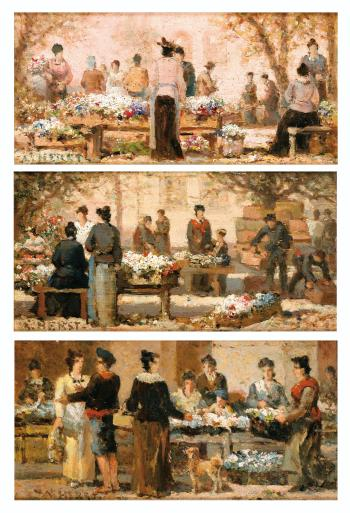
Scènes De Marché, Auguste Herst. Oil on panel. Three works.

Auguste Clément Joseph Herst (18 August 1825, Rocroi - 10 August 1900, Nice) was a French watercolour and oil painter who exhibited at the Salon of 1861 and at later exhibitions. Between ca. 1840 and 1860 he lived in Scheveningen in the Netherlands. Landscape paintings included Boulogne-sur-Mer, Marseilles, La Grande Chartreuse (near Grenoble), Fontainebleau, Savoy and Normandy. He was one of the teachers in Paris of Armand Point. He was last cited in 1888.
