= Gaston de Pawlowski =

French writer

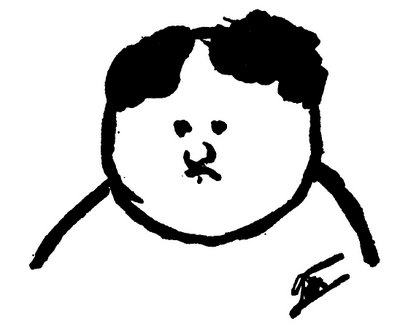
Self-portrait

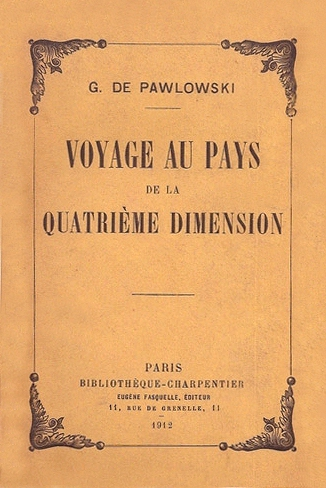
Voyage au pays de la quatrième dimension, 1912.

Gaston de Pawlowski (Joigny, 14 June 1874 - 2 February 1933, Paris) was a French writer best known for his prophetic 1911 novel of science fiction, Voyage au pays de la quatrième dimension (Voyage to the Land of the Fourth Dimension). He is buried in Pere Lachaise cemetery (Division 23), in Paris.

== Voyage au pays de la quatrième dimension ==
First published in 1911 in the monthly review Comœdia then in 1912, Pawlowski produced a new edition in 1923 in which he discussed the implications of Einsteinian physics upon his work. That edition was published in an English translation by Brian Stableford in 2009.

The illustrations for the book edition of the Voyage were prepared by Léonard Sarluis which Jean Clair thought was the inspiration for Marcel Duchamp's Large Glass.

== Selected publications ==
- Voyage au pays de la quatrième dimension. Charpentier, Paris, 1912. (Second edition 1923)
- Journey to the Land of the Fourth Dimension. English translation by Brian M. Stableford. Encino, CA: Black Coat Press, 2009. ISBN 978-1-934543-37-5
