= Léonard Sarluis =

French painter

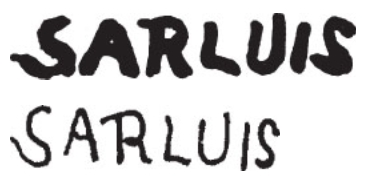
Léonard Sarluis signatures

Salomon-Léon Sarluis, known as Léonard Sarluis, (21 October 1874 – 20 April 1949) was a naturalised French Symbolist painter.

Sarluis was born in The Hague. He arrived in Paris in 1894 and became a well-known boulevardier. He travelled widely, including to Naples, Italy and to Russia. His work was praised by Jean Lorrain and Oscar Wilde.

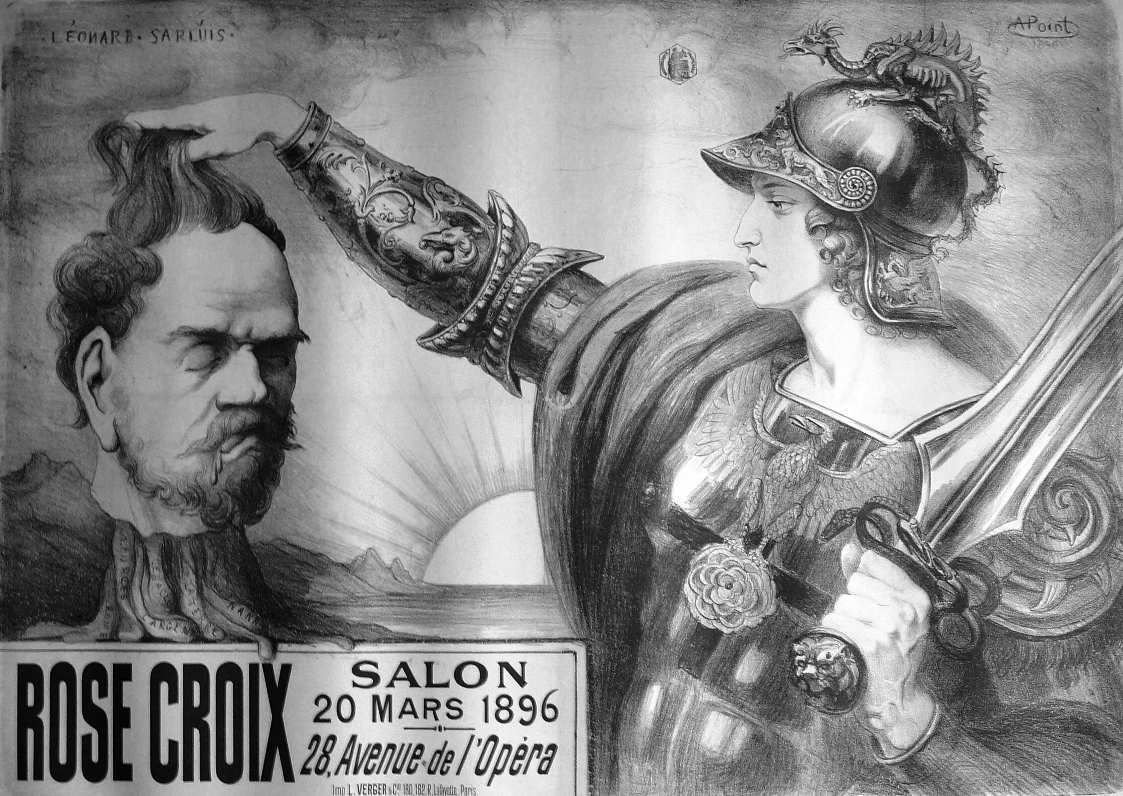
Poster for the fifth Salon de la Rose+Croix, 1896. Designed by Sarluis and Armand Point.

He exhibited at the Salon de la Rose+Croix and the Salon des Artistes Français, and with Armand Point he designed the poster for the fifth salon of that group. It depicted the Ideal in the form of Perseus holding the severed head of Émile Zola in reference to the Greek myth in which Perseus decapitated the Gorgon Medusa. For the Symbolists, Zola exemplified in literature the oppressive Naturalism they rejected.

== Notable works ==
Sarluis completed the decorative illustrations for the refectory bar at the Paris newspaper Le Journal and worked for years on a Mystic Interpretation of the Bible, the paintings for which he exhibited in London in 1928. He illustrated Gaston de Pawlowski's Voyage to the Land of the Fourth Dimension which Jean Clair thought was the inspiration for Marcel Duchamp's Large Glass.

He died by suicide on 20 April 1949 in Paris.
