= Armand Point =

French painter

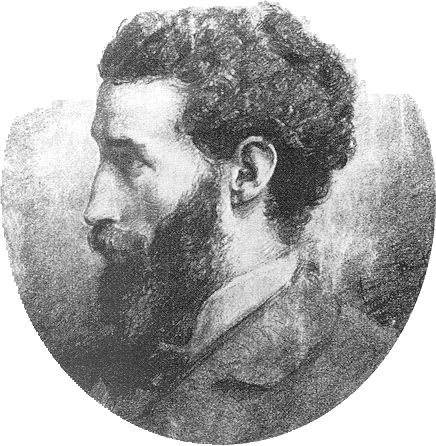
Armand Point, self-portrait

Armand Point (23 March 1860 or 23 March 1861 – February 1932 or March 1932) was a French painter, engraver and designer who was associated with the Symbolist movement and was one of the founders of the Salon de la Rose + Croix. Later he formed his own atelier. Sources differ over the details of his birth and death.

== Personal life ==
Point was born in Algiers, and died in either Naples, or Marlotte, Seine-et-Marne.

== Early career ==
Point's earliest works were orientalist scenes of markets and musicians and the street life of his youth in Algeria. In 1888 he travelled to Paris where he studied at the Ecole des Beaux-Arts under Auguste Herst and Fernand Cormon. He was linked to Numa Gillet. From 1890 he exhibited at the Société Nationale des Beaux-Arts.

== Move towards Idealism ==
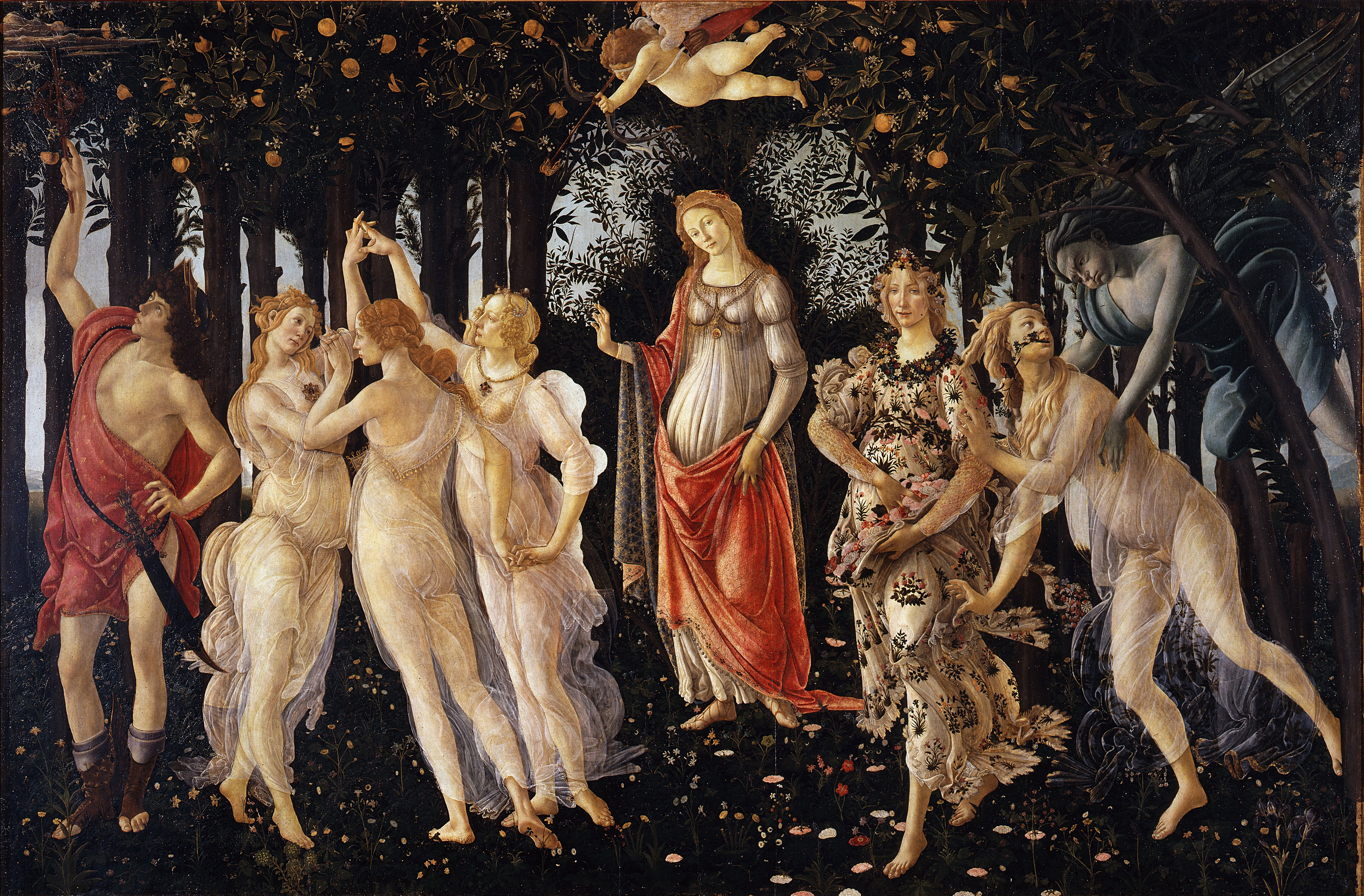
Primavera, Sandro Botticelli, c. 1482. Tempera on panel. Uffizi Gallery, Florence

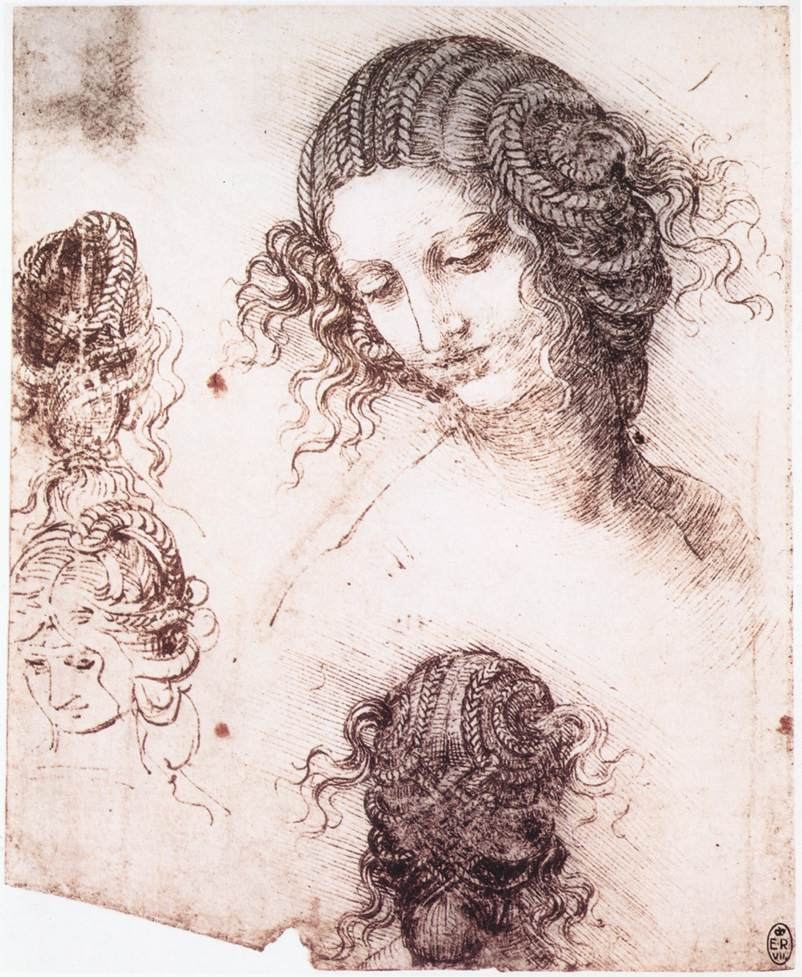
Study for the head of Leda, Leonardo da Vinci, c. 1506–1508. Royal Library, Windsor

Point was influenced by Ruskin and the Pre-Raphaelite Brotherhood and was a member of the first Nabis group. In 1894 he made a trip to Italy with Hélène Linder (1867–1955) (later Mme Berthelot) where he saw Sandro Botticelli's Primavera for the first time outside of an engraving. The experience made a deep impression on him and he wrote that his eyes "first opened up" on seeing it, leading soon after to attempts to establish a movement in France to resurrect the art of the 15th and 16th centuries. The influence of Botticelli and Leonardo da Vinci became evident in his work, for instance in the c. 1895 Eternal Chimera. Hélène Linder became an ideal female model for Point who often painted her in a Leonardesque style but dressed like a muse from Botticelli. Leonardo da Vinci's Study for the head of Leda (study for an original painting now lost) seems to have influenced the hair styles that he gave Hélène. Hélène married French diplomat Philippe Berthelot just before the start of the First World War. Philippe Jullian described Point as moving, at this time, from a "dreamy realism to a detailed idealism".

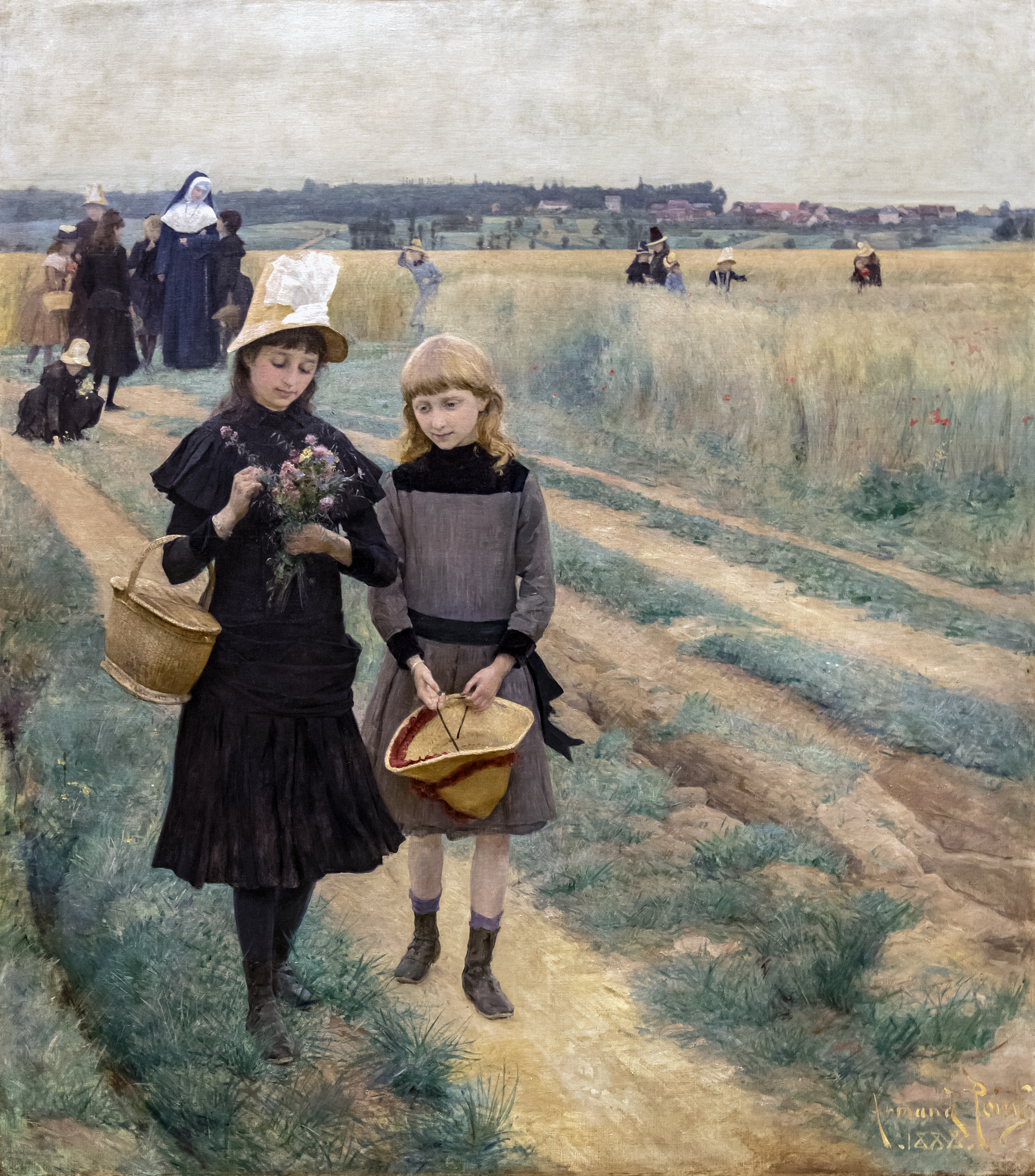
Thursday's walk in the fields, 1888. Musée des Augustins Toulouse

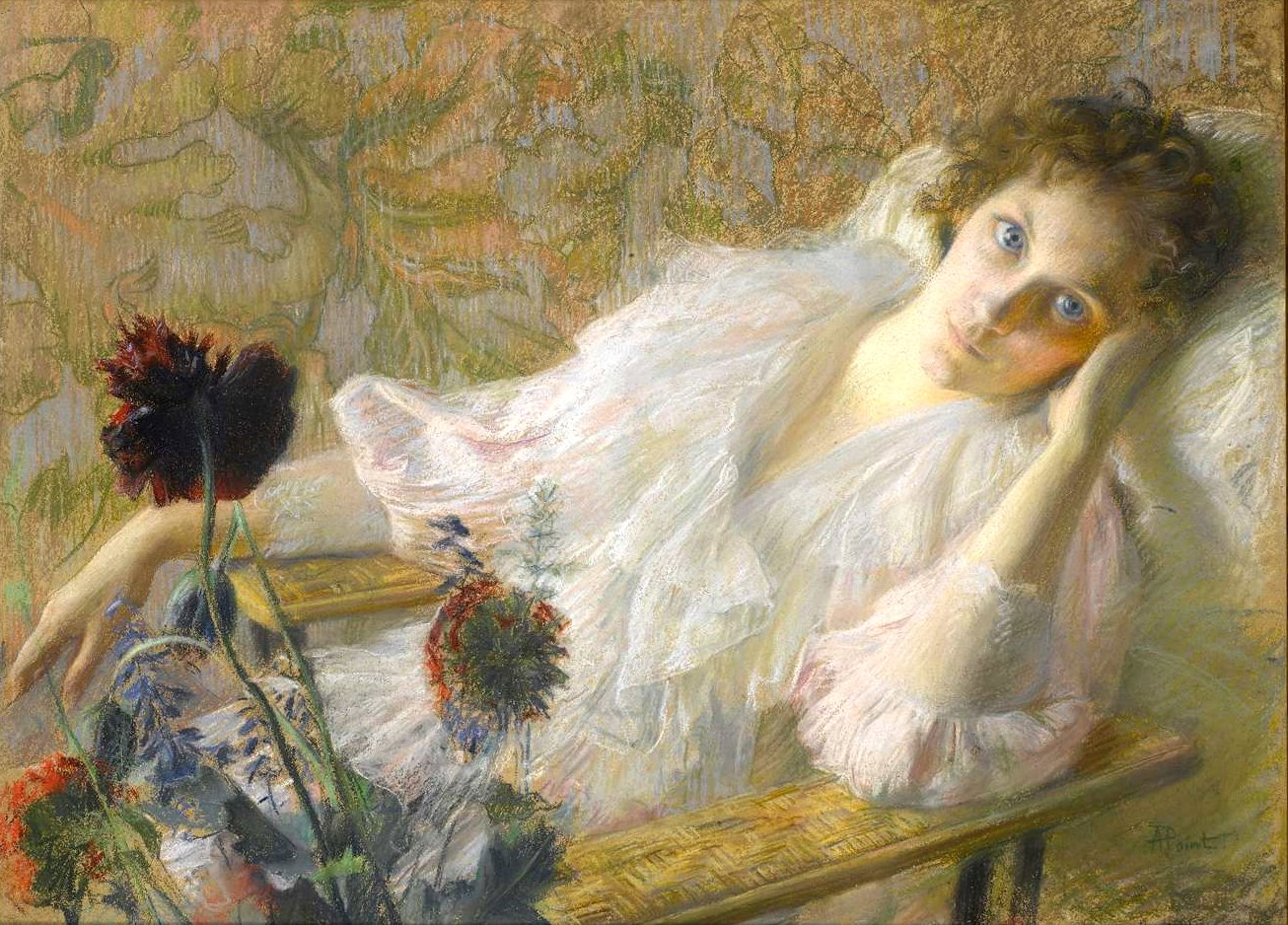
Ame d’Automne (Autumn Soul). Pastel on brown paper, c. 1890s. Model probably Hélène Linder

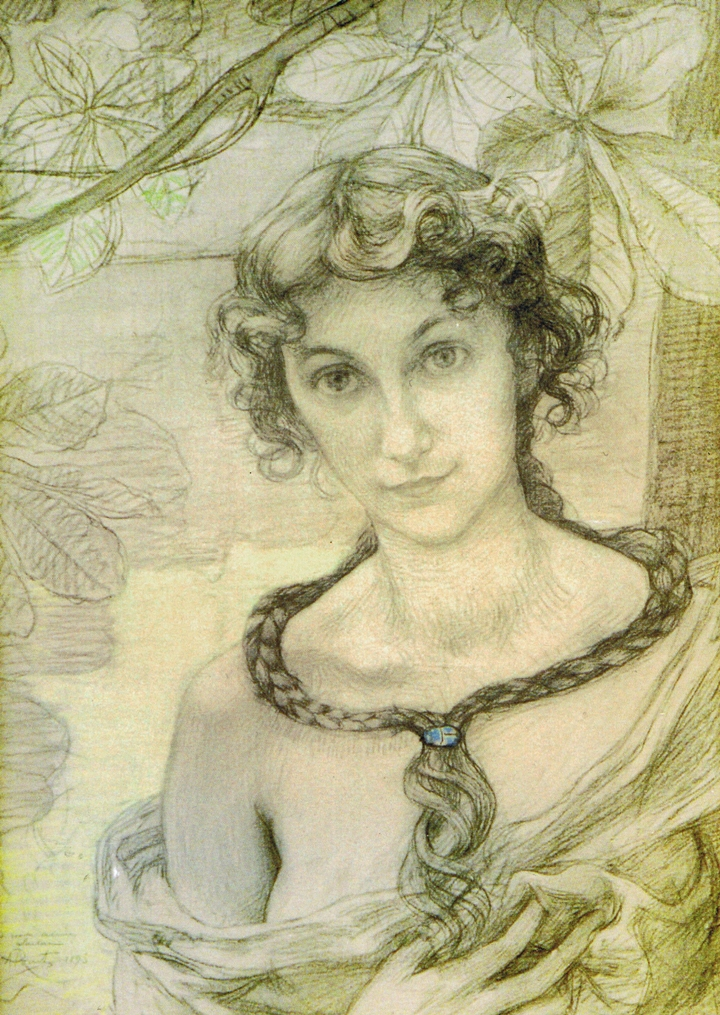
Hélène Linder, 1893 drawing

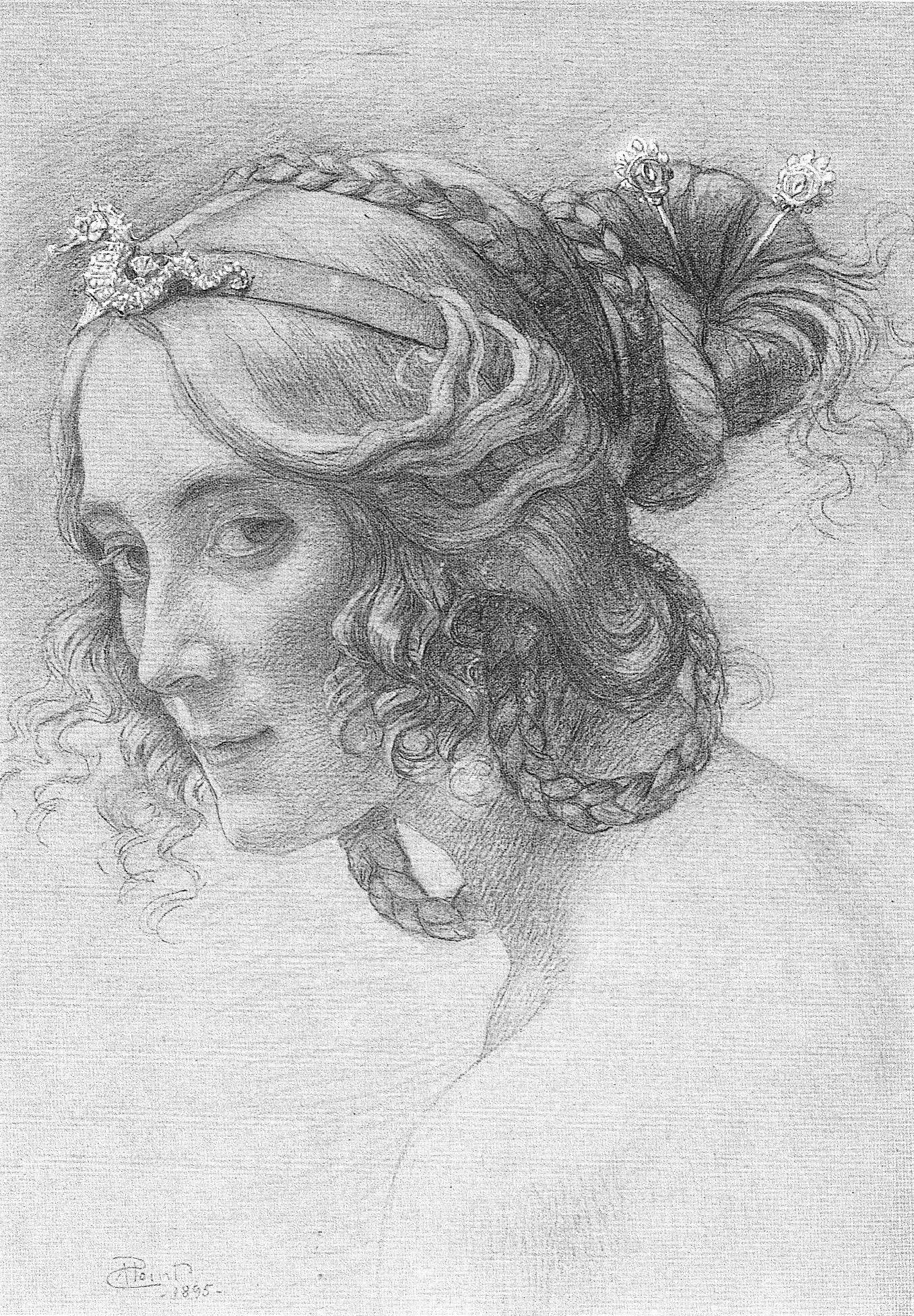
A Portrait of Madame Berthelot. Charcoal and coloured chalks, 1895. Private collection

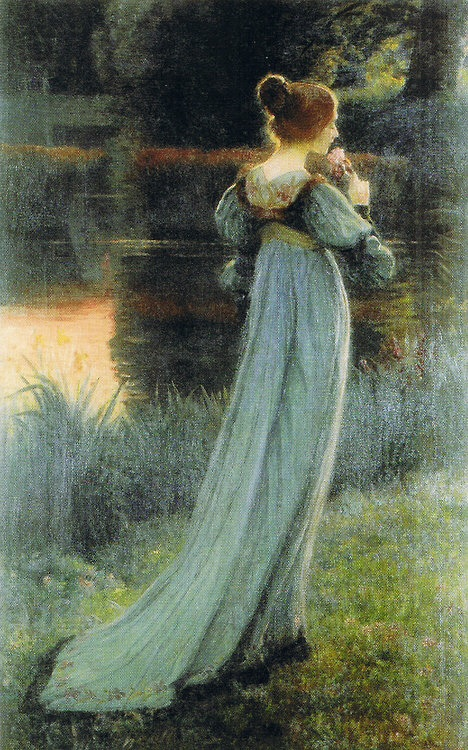
Remeniscing by the Pond, c. 1900

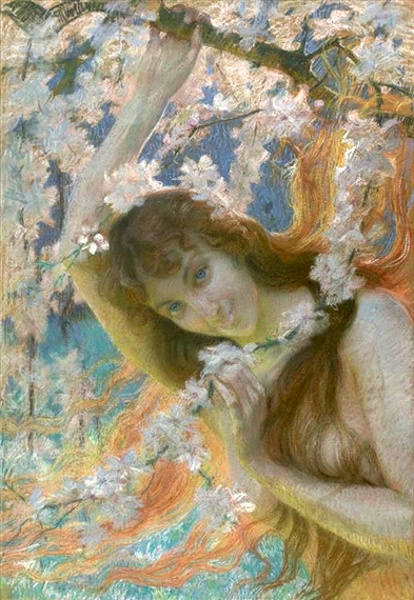
Woman with cherry blossom, undated

== Symbolism ==
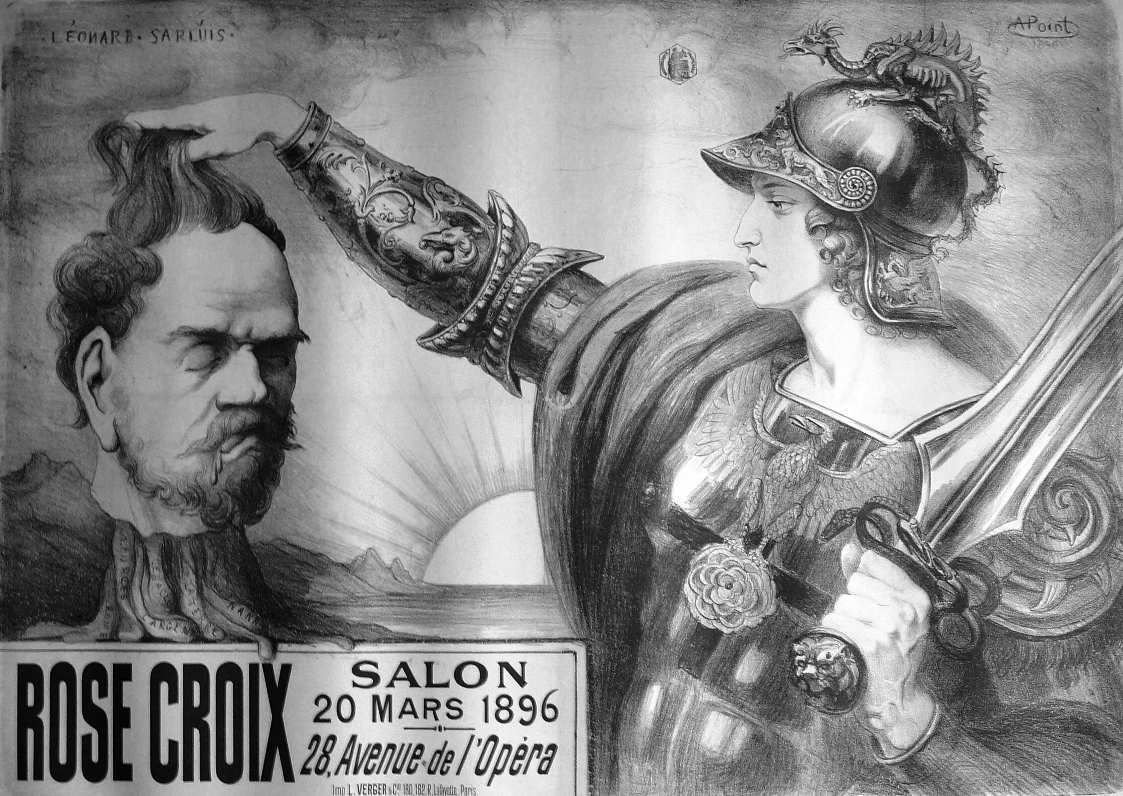
Poster for the fifth Salon de la Rose+Croix, 1896. Designed by Point and Léonard Sarluis.

Soon, Point was moving towards fully fledged Symbolism. He made a determined effort to reject the modern world and the realism of Zola and Courbet. He adopted Rosicrucianism and became a friend of "Sâr" Peladan. Edward Lucie-Smith described him as a "medievalizing painter ... whose style mingled the influence of Moreau with that of the Pre-Raphaelites". From 1892 to 1896, Point exhibited at the Salon de la Rose+Croix and with Léonard Sarluis he designed the poster for the fifth salon of that group. It depicted the Ideal in the form of Perseus holding the severed head of Émile Zola in reference to the Greek myth in which Perseus decapitated the Gorgon Medusa. For the Symbolists, Zola exemplified in literature the oppressive Naturalism they rejected.

Subjects at this time were usually mythological, such as his 1897 The Siren which included a typical Symbolist femme fatale figure luring men to their doom. Also in 1897, Point contributed an original lithograph titled the Golden Legend (Fr. Légende dorée) to the L'Estampe Moderne. The journal included four original prints in each issue and Point's was issued in Number 5, September 1897. Other artists who contributed included Alphonse Mucha, Henri Fantin-Latour and Edward Burne-Jones.

== Atelier de Haute-Claire ==
The highly ornate Coffret d'Ophélie (Ophelia Box) produced at Atelier de Haute-Claire.

From 1896 to 1901 Point lived in Marlotte, where he founded the Atelier de Haute-Claire not far from the home of the Barbizon school. Around the turn of the century, the distinction between the fine and decorative arts was beginning to break down and Point became increasingly interested in the latter. He sought to emulate William Morris in revolting against nineteenth-century materialism and produced applied art, including furniture, jewellery, fabrics, ceramics and wallpaper that harked back to the techniques and styles of the Middle Ages. Everything was hand-made to a very high standard of craftmanship in an effort to avoid the alienating effect of industrial mass production. As a result, however, the products of the atelier were luxury items that could only be purchased by an elite and the project therefore failed to meet one of its key objectives.

The Symbolist journal L'Ermitage criticised the works of the Haute-Claire group for amounting to religious icons fit only for reverence in a case in a museum and having little to do with the France of today. One such ornate object was the Coffret d'Ophélie (Ophelia Box), a box in the form of a medieval reliquary, that referred to the Ophelia of Shakespeare much celebrated by the Pre-Raphaelites. The box included bronze, cabochon, champlevé enamelling, cloisonné, ivory, gold and other expensive materials and techniques. A number of similar boxes exist from the atelier, including an alternative Ophelia box (1903) and a Coffret aux serpents (1897–99), both in the Musée d'Orsay. The number of different materials and processes involved in making each box meant that production was complex and a number of different craftsmen were required to make each one, for instance, noted ceramicist Charles Virion. Philippe Jullian described the products of the atelier as more Neo-Byzantine than Art Nouveau.

A diverse group of people visited Haute-Claire, including Oscar Wilde just months before his death in 1900. Wilde was in exile in France following imprisonment in Britain.

== Early and orientalist works ==
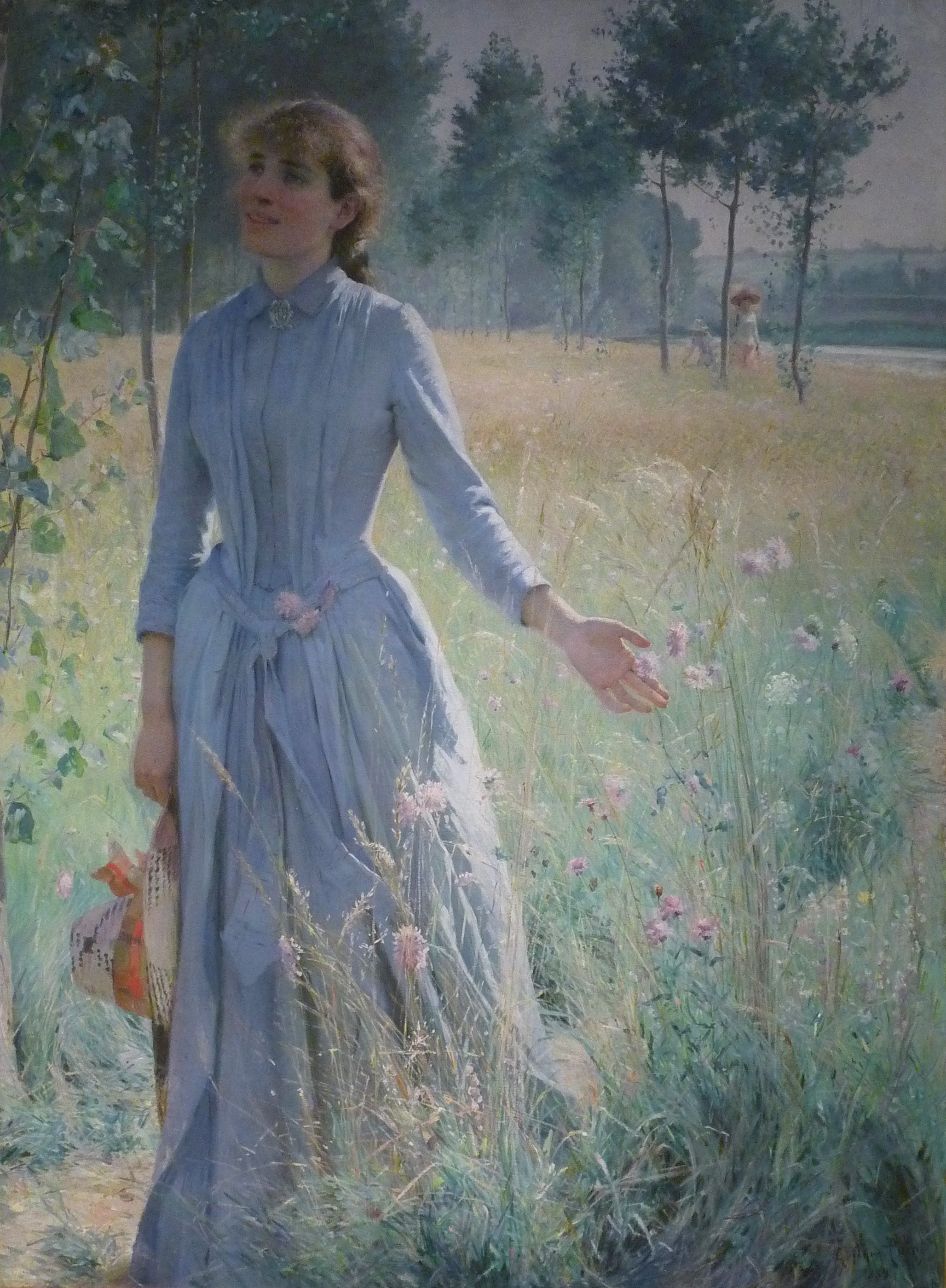
La Joie des choses. 1884.

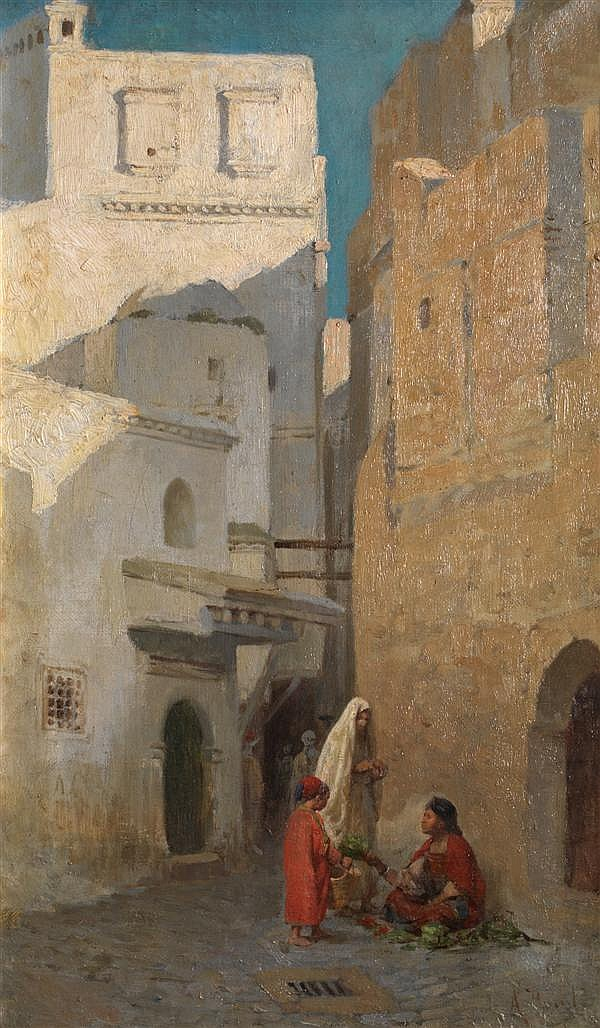
Market Street.

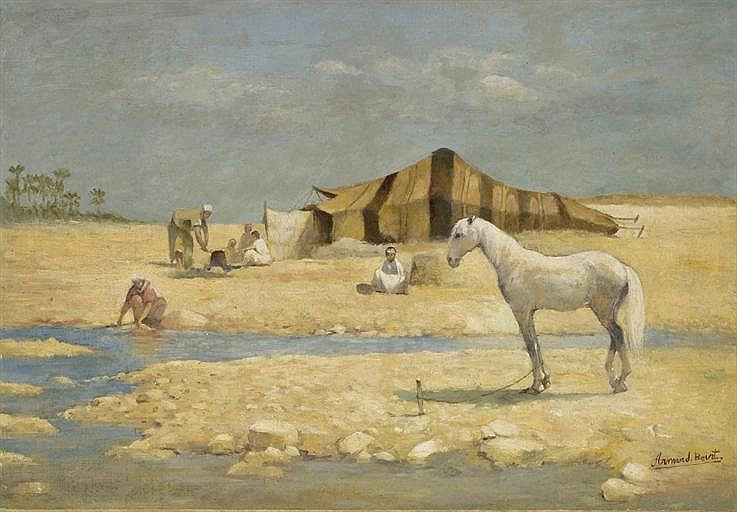
At the Water's Edge.

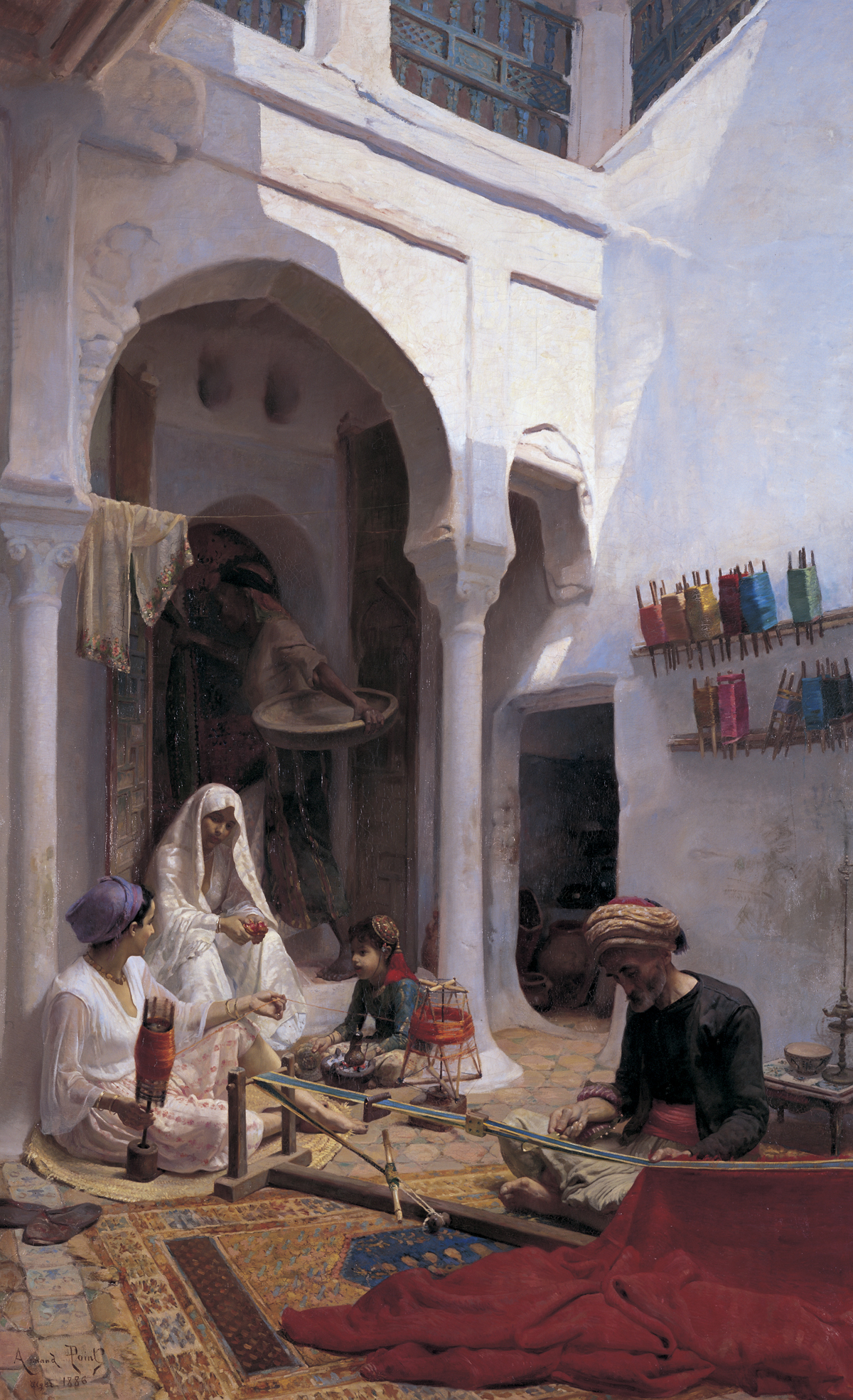
Arab Weaver. 1886.

== Symbolist works ==
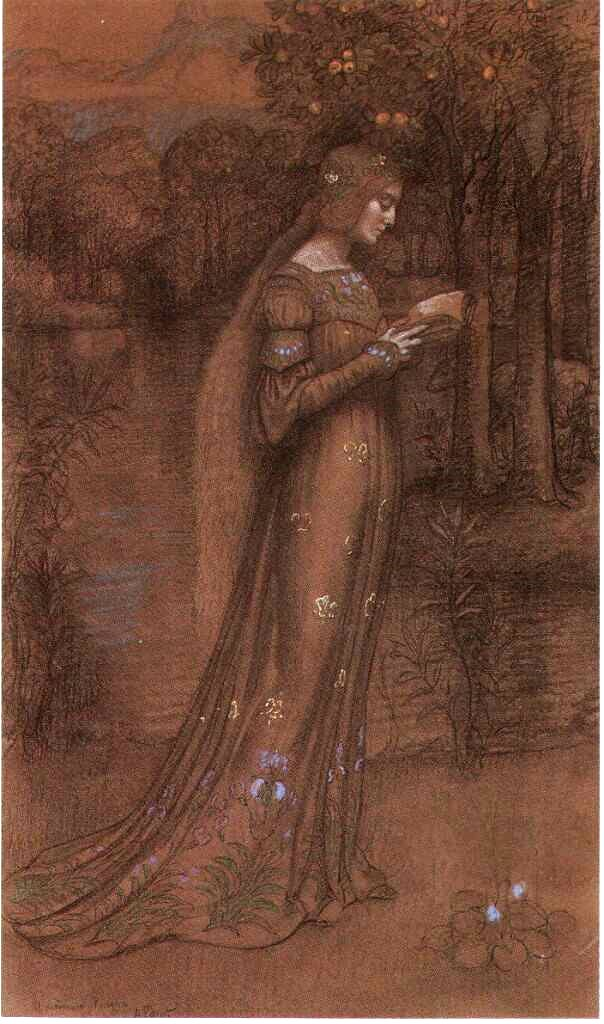
Eternal Chimera. Lead pencil and pastel, c. 1895.

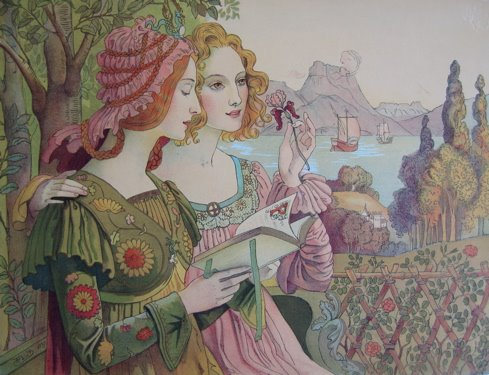
Golden legend. (Fr. Légende dorée) Lithograph, 1897.

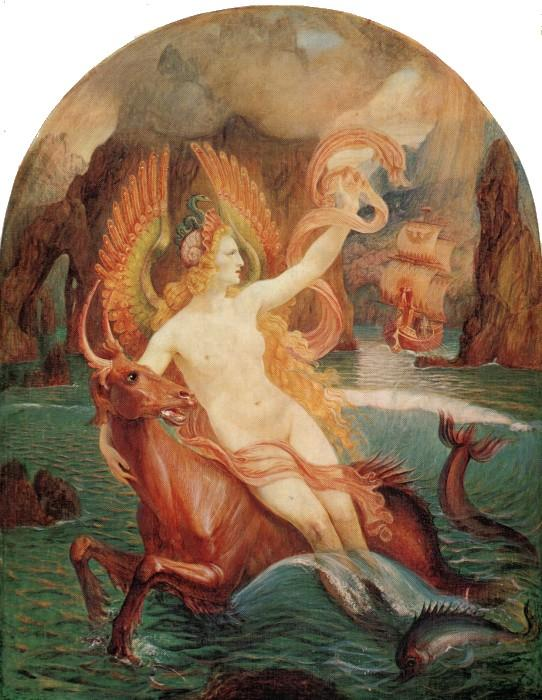
The Siren. 1897.

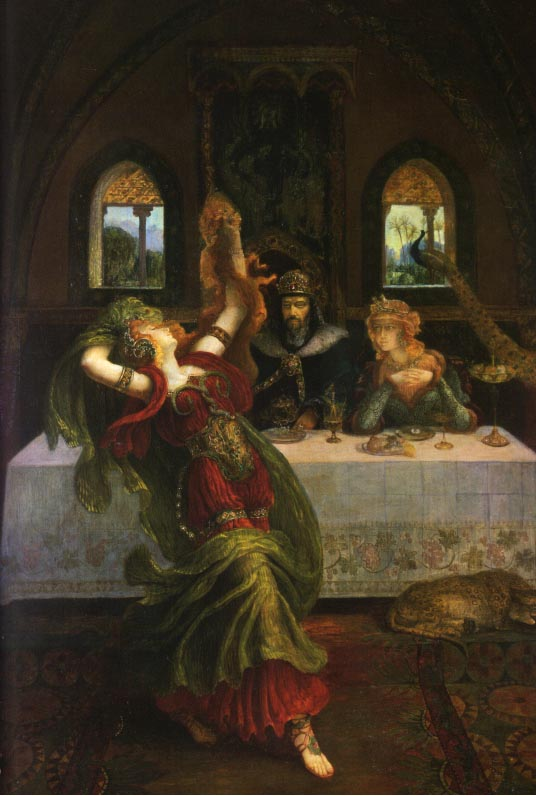
Dance of Salome. Oil on canvas, 1898.

== Later works ==
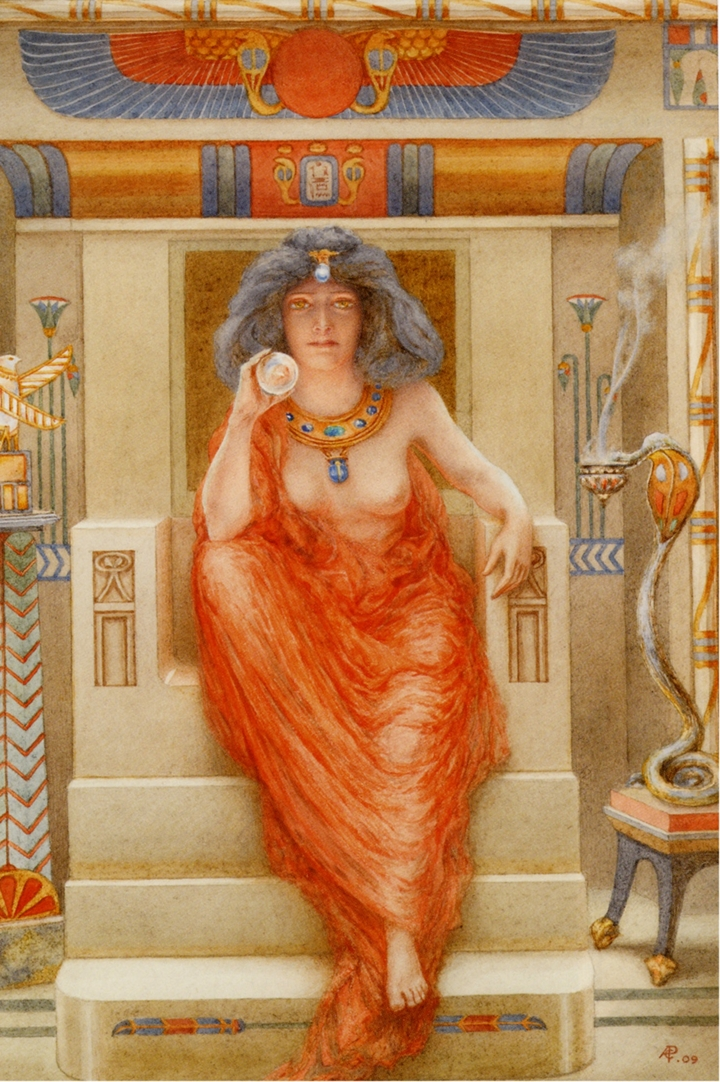
Portrait of an Egyptian goddess, probably Isis. Watercolour, 1909.

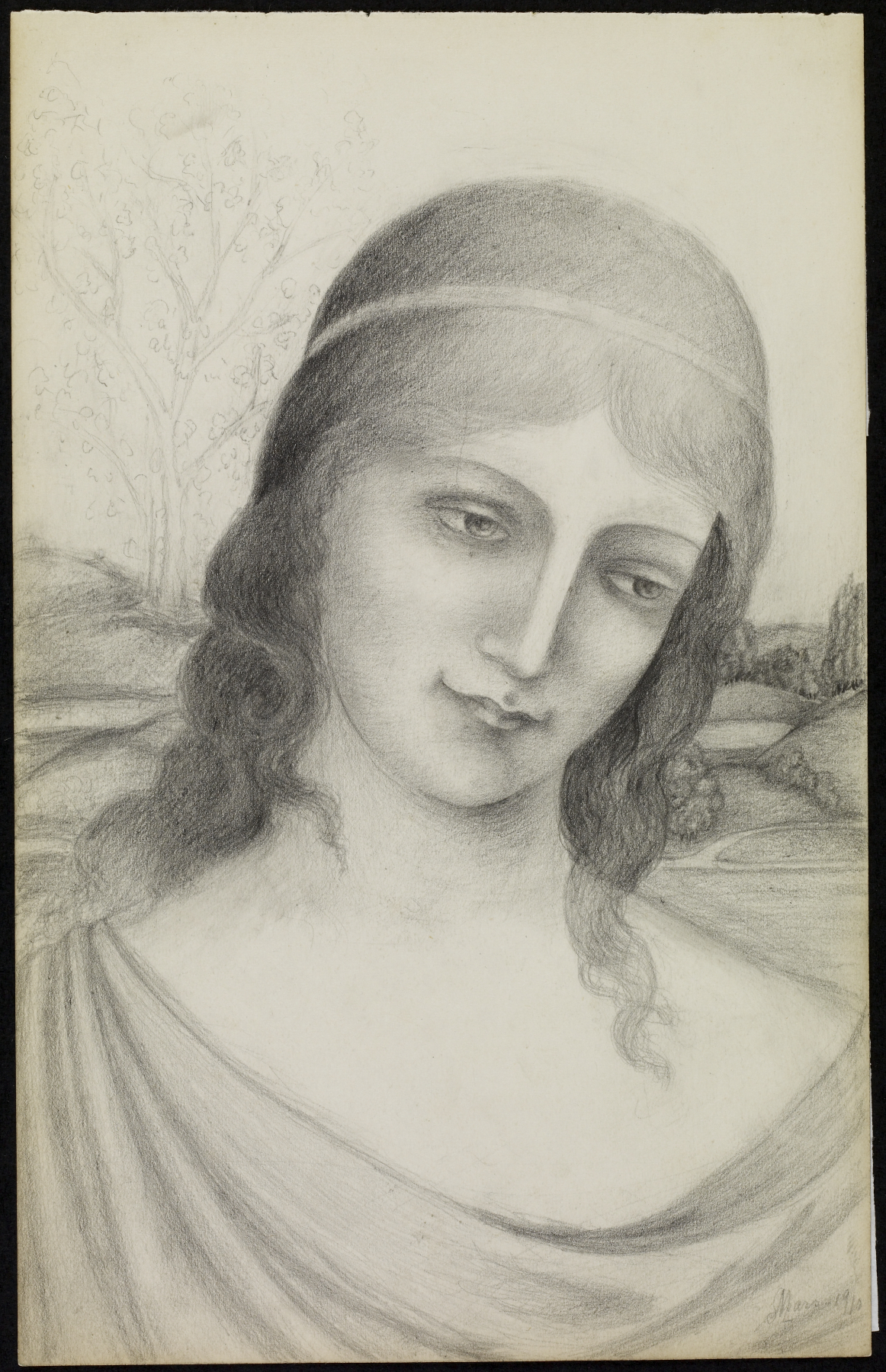
Bust of a woman in a landscape. Pencil on paper, 1910. Walters Art Museum, Baltimore.

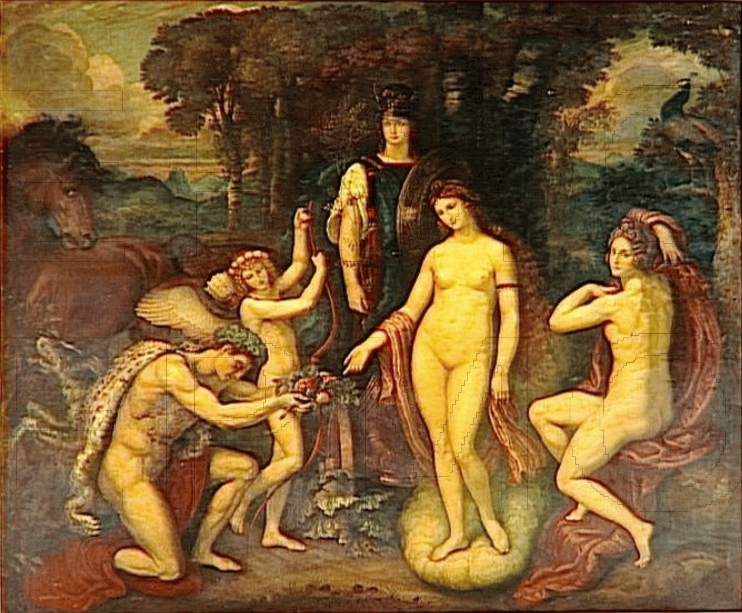
The Judgement of Paris. Oil on canvas, 1910 or 1911.

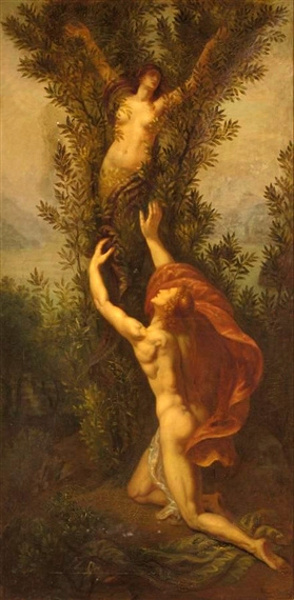
Apollo and Daphne. Oil on canvas, 1919.
