= Numa François Gillet =

French painter

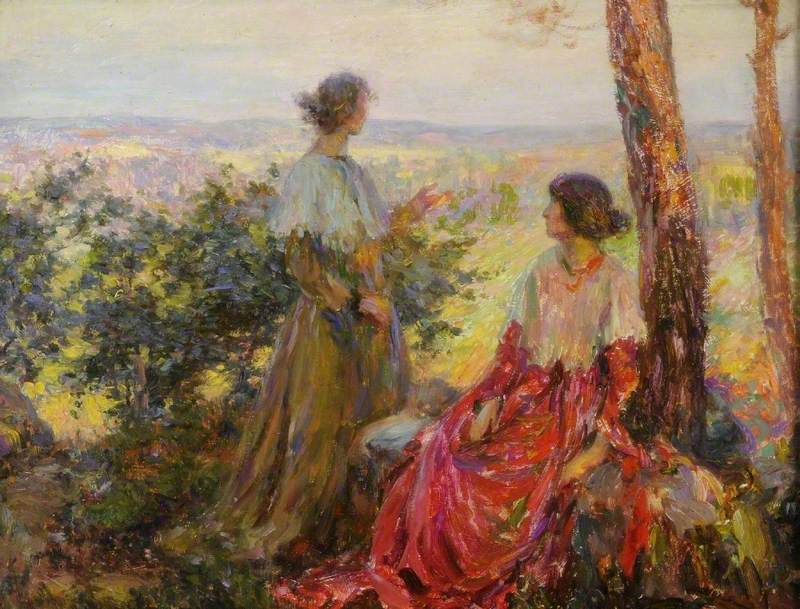
Summer Sunshine by Numa François Gillet. Oil on canvas. Museums Sheffield.

Numa François Gillet (born 1868, Bordeaux) was a French painter who was a member of the Salon des Artistes Français where he exhibited hors concours, he was also made a Chevalier of the Légion d'honneur. He often worked with his close friend Armand Point.
