= Henri Boutet =

French engraver and illustrator

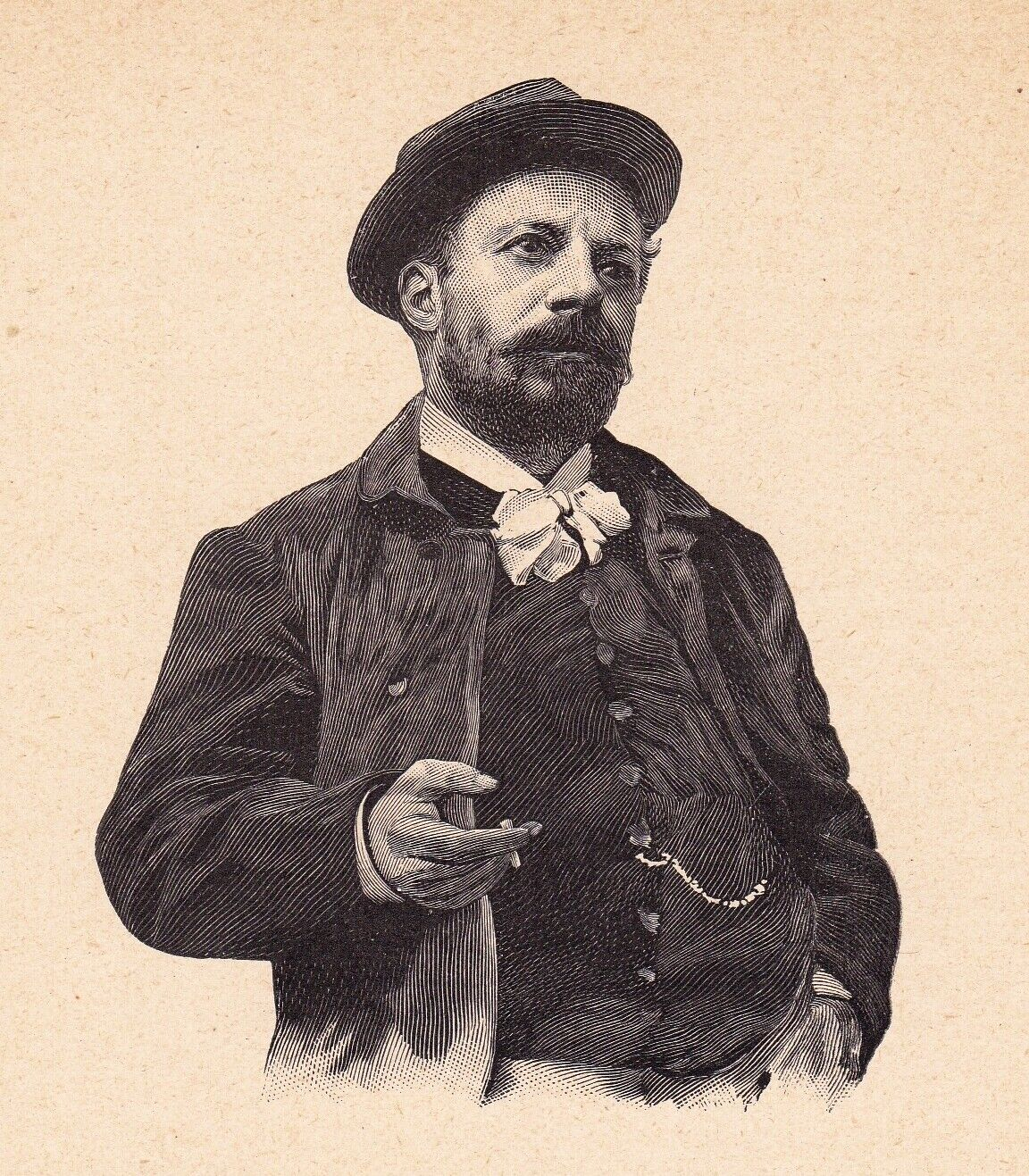
- Henri Boutet (1897)
- Born: 1851; Sainte-Hermine (Vendée)
- Died: 1919 (aged 67–68); Paris

Henri Boutet (1851, Sainte-Hermine (Vendée), France – June 9, 1919, Paris, France) is a French engraver and illustrator. He was nicknamed the "little master of corset" or the "painter of the midinette"

== Biography ==
Boutet specializes in the 1890s in the production of etchings and drypoints representing women in negligee, in the style of "Parisian" and has had little success with an informed public. The print is in limited edition. With his growing reputation, Boutet launched his own publishing house and sold his productions to periodicals such as Le Frou-frou, L'Assiette au beurre, Le Pêle-Mêle, or artistic publications such as La Plume, L'Estampe originale, The modern print or even the Hundred Collection. It illustrates many almanacs (The Female Year), calendars, menus. In 1902 he published "Les Modes Feminines du XIX^{e} Siecle" which met with instant acclaim. His 100 drypoint etchings showed the development of fashion for each year from 1801 to 1900 – drypoint etching results in an image with intrinsic softness of texture. The illustrations were hand-coloured, with close attention to detail, and a treatment that showed his affection for the subject matter. This collection of original etchings was limited to an edition of 600 copies.

== Works ==
Etchings, drypoint, lithography, fashion prints

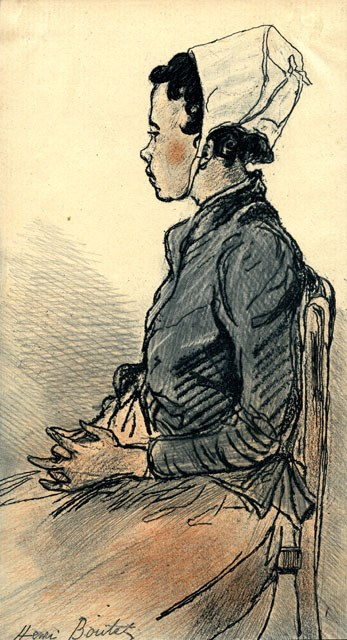
Cancalaise, color etching, Musée départemental Breton

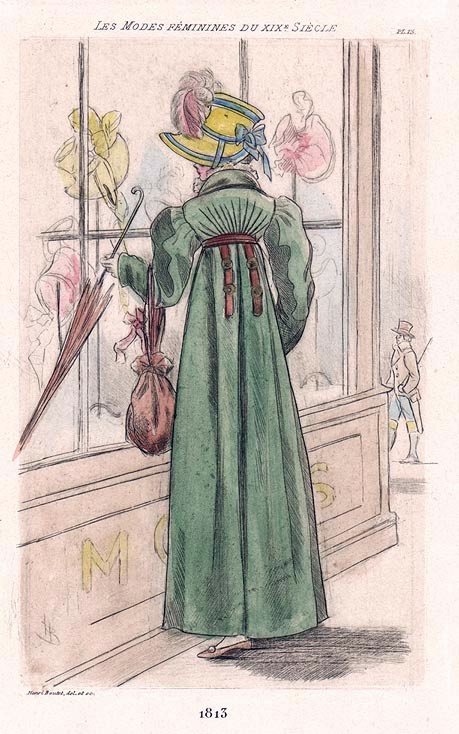
1813 "Les Modes Feminines du XIX Siecle", Original Drypoint Etchings with Colour

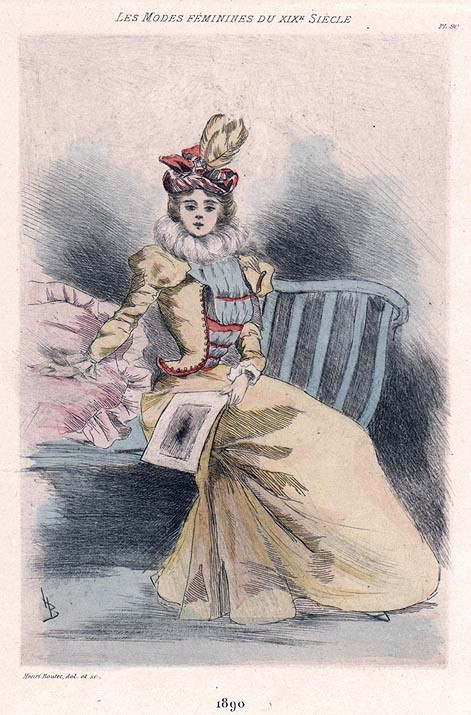
1890, "Les Modes Feminines du XIX Siecle", Original Drypoint Etchings with Colour

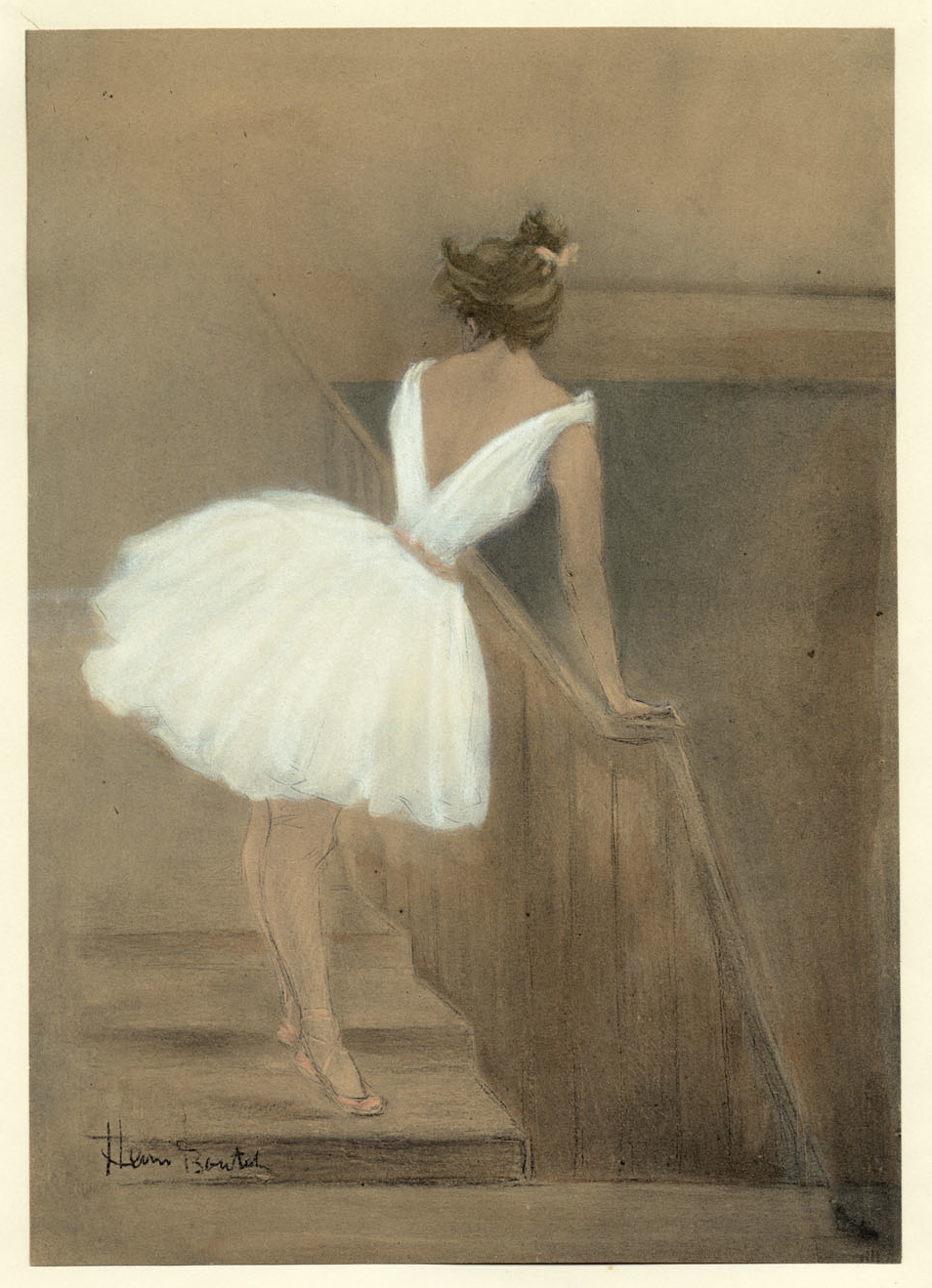
Dans les coulisses by Henri Boutet, lithographic print from L'Estampe moderne, Paris

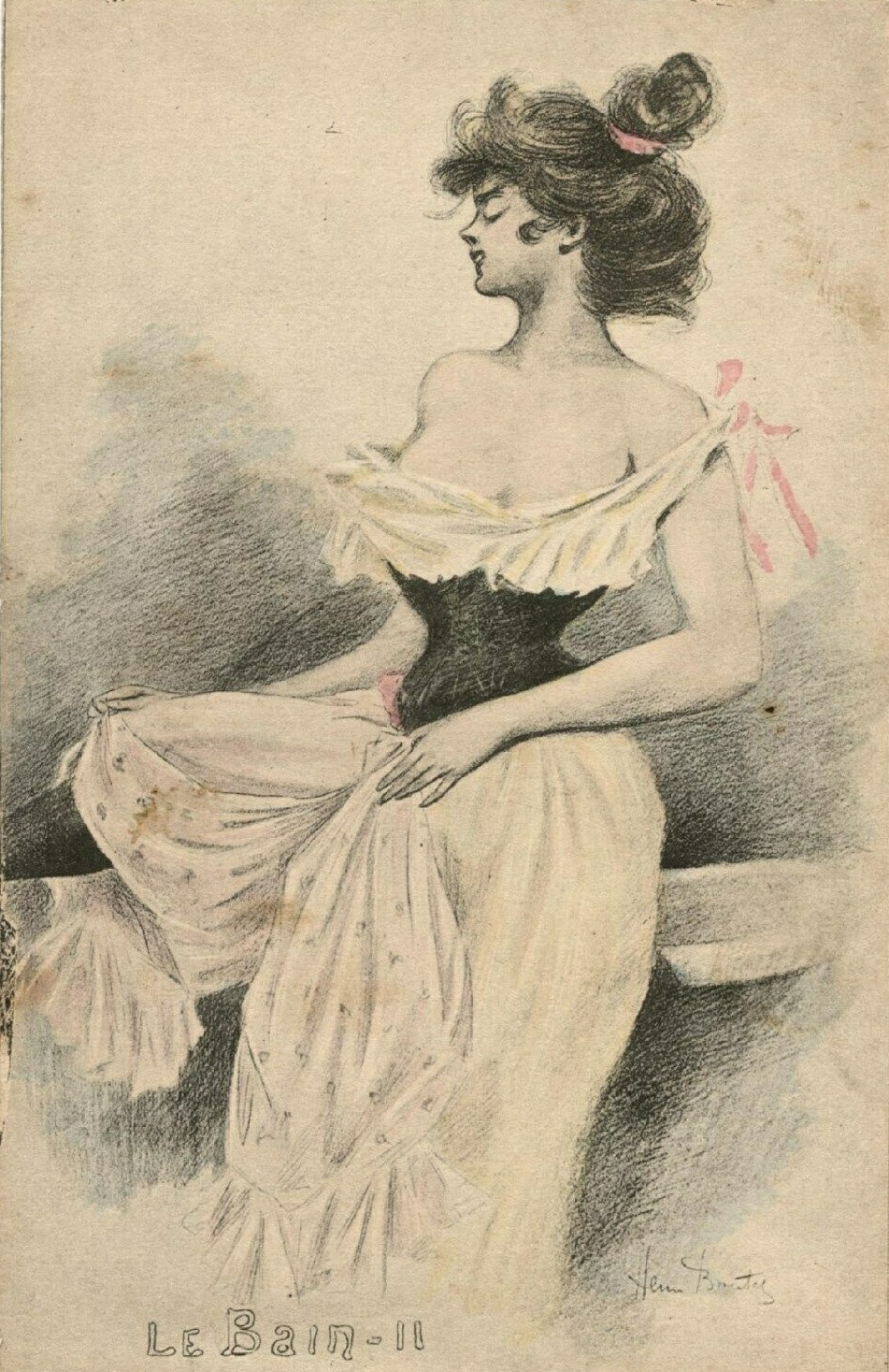
Le Bain 11 "Autour d'Elles" by Henri Boutet

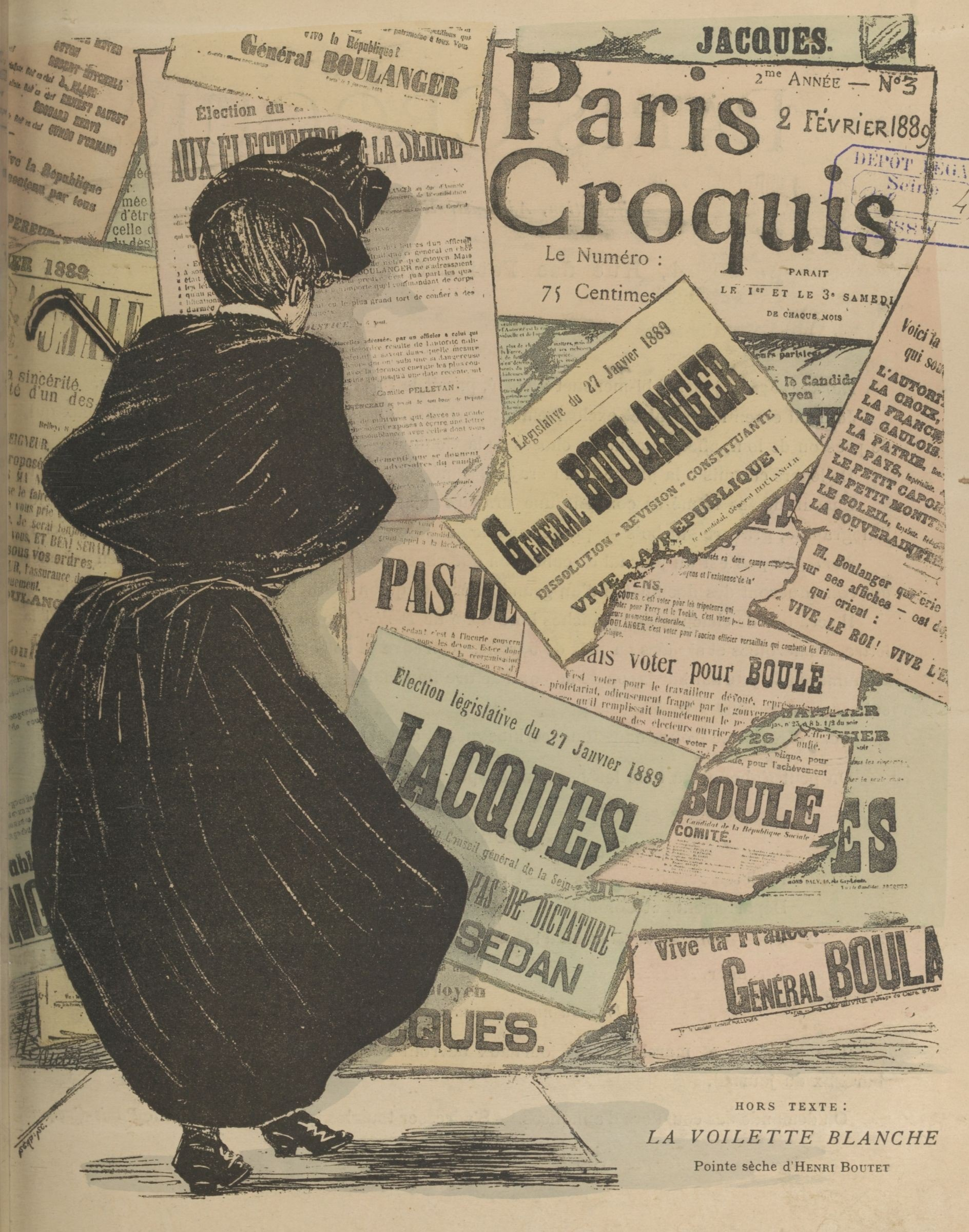
Couverture du Paris Croquis du 2 février 1889.

== Publications ==
- L'Art moderne, 1882-1883
- Autour des Parisiennes
- Les Modes Feminines du XIX^{e} Siecle, 1908
- Les fils de Washington en France, 215 original lithographs, 1918
- Le Coeur de Paris en 1915 : Tableaux de la guerre, 1916
- L'Ame de Paris. : Tableaux de la guerre de 1914, 1915
- L'année féminine (1895) : les deshabillés au théâtre, 1896
- Les petits mémoires de Paris, 1908–1909
- Autour d'Elles : Le Lever-Le Coucher, 1899
