= Homer Laughlin =

American businessman and potter

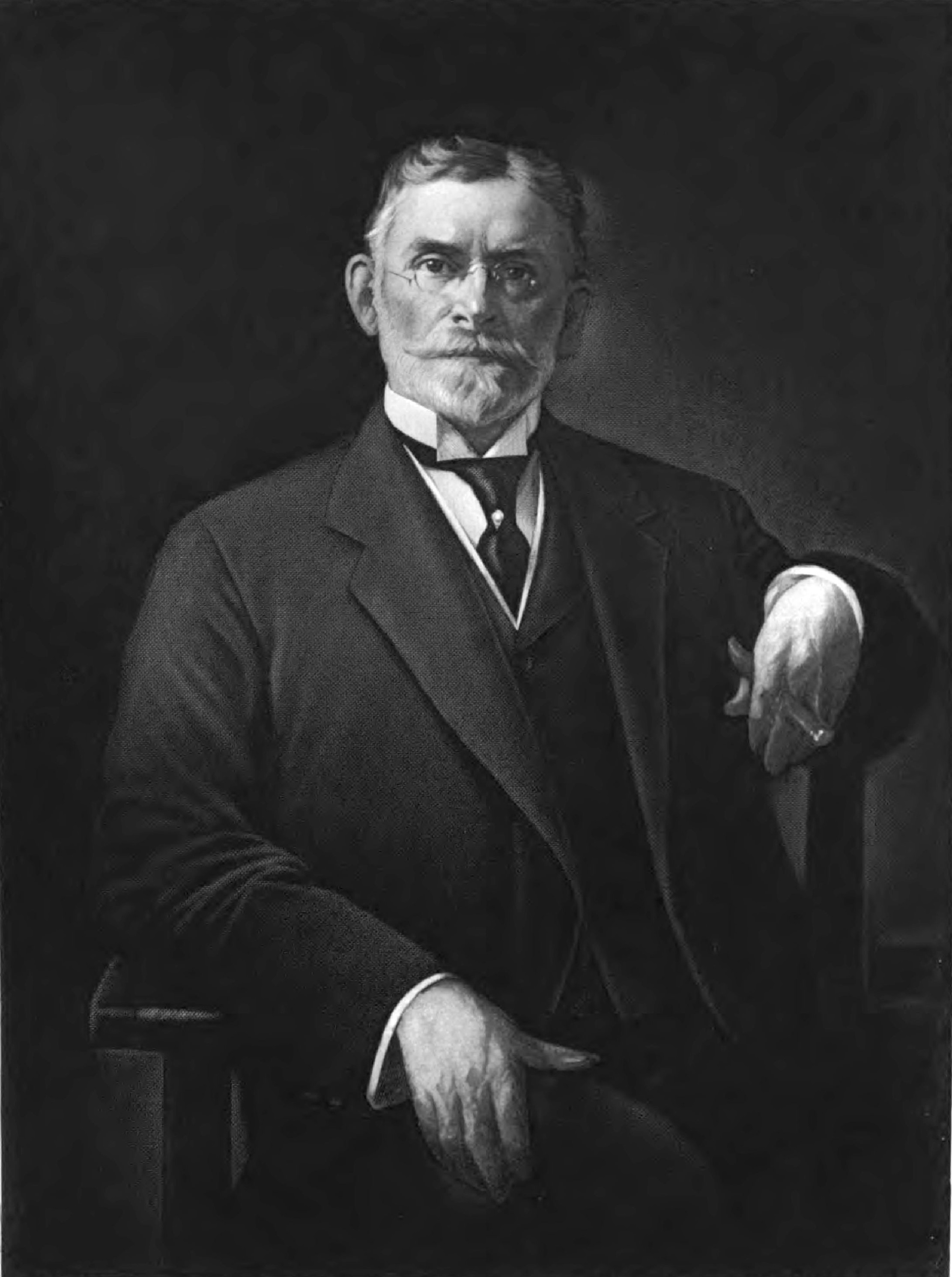
- Engraving of Laughlin in 1915
- Born: March 23, 1843; Columbiana County, Ohio, U.S.
- Died: January 10, 1913 (aged 69); Los Angeles, California, U.S.
- Resting place: Inglewood Park Cemetery
- Spouse: Cornelia Battenberg (m. 1875; died 1907)
- Children: 3

Homer Laughlin (March 23, 1843 – January 10, 1913) was an American businessman and potter. With his brother Shakespeare, he formed the Laughlin Pottery Company, now known as Fiesta Tableware Company, in 1871.

== Biography ==
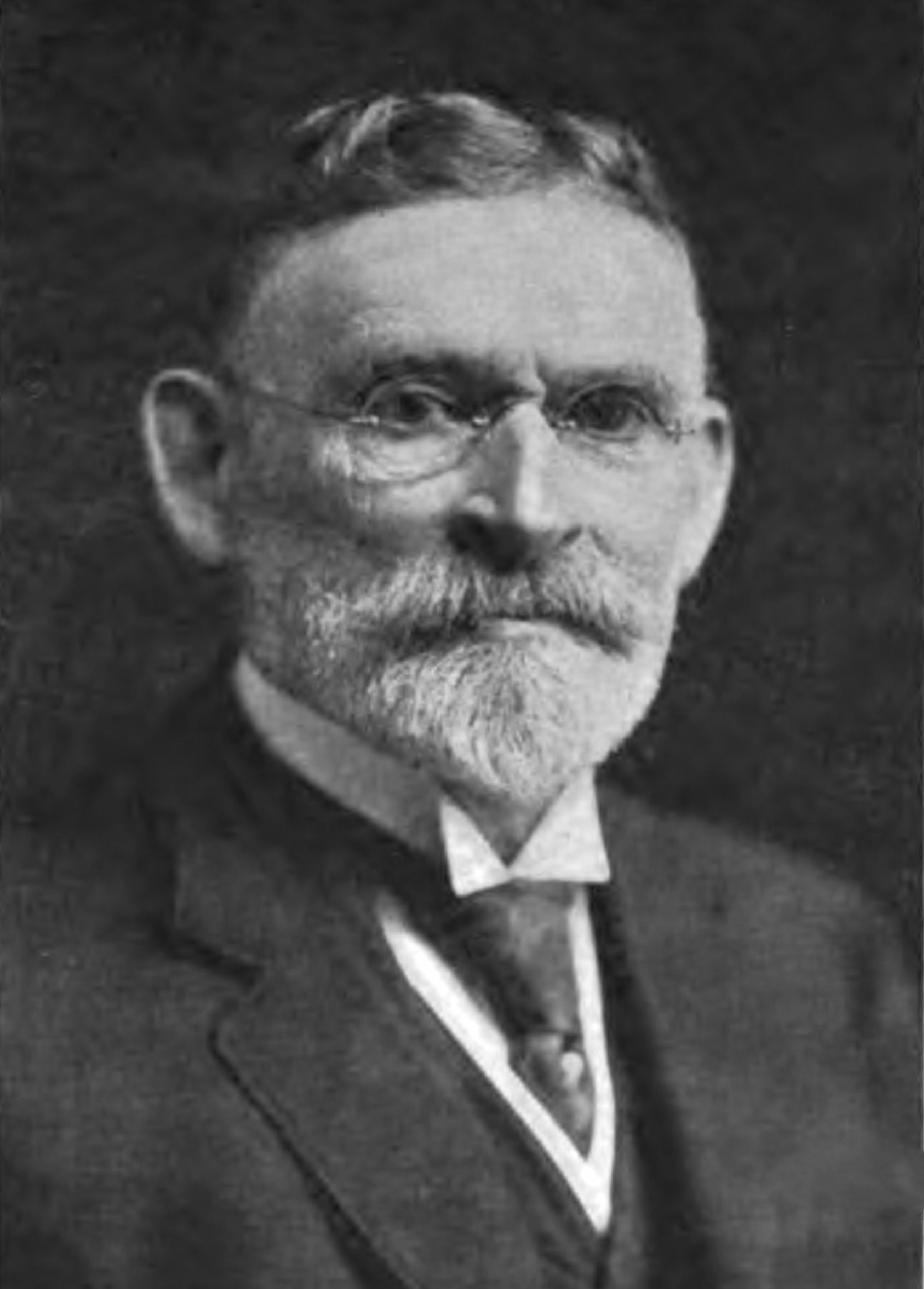
Homer Laughlin

Homer Laughlin was born near the Little Beaver Creek in Columbiana County, Ohio, on March 23, 1843. Laughlin's parents were miller, merchant and postmaster Matthew Laughlin (1799–1876), of Scotch-Irish descent, and Maria (née Moore; 1814–1888), Laughlin was educated at public schools and later at Neville Institute (now defunct). He did Civil War service from 1862 to 1865. A large part of his service was on detached duty as expert recorder of important military tribunals and he participated in the engagements around Murfreesboro, Tennessee.

After he was mustered out of the army, he worked in retail in Pittsburgh for a while, and later he worked in petroleum development in Pennsylvania for a year, boring twelve oil wells. He then became a travelling salesman of Rockingham style crockery throughout the Midwest.

Homer then moved to New York where he worked with his brother Shakespeare Moore Laughlin as an importer of English earthenware. In 1873, they built a pottery in East Liverpool, Ohio, which they ran as Laughlin Brothers until 1879 when Homer bought out Shakespeare. Their crockery became so popular that the company was accused of counterfeiting English trademarks by British manufacturers. In response to this accusation, Laughlin devised an anti-English trademark of a lion supine mounted by a rampant eagle standing on the lion's belly. The company became the largest manufacturer of crockery in the country.

Laughlin Pottery then became the Homer Laughlin China Company. In 1889, William Edwin Wells joined Homer Laughlin, and seven years later the two incorporated the company. Laughlin sold his interest to Wells shortly thereafter. The company moved operations across the Ohio River to West Virginia land purchased from the Newell family. Laughlin moved to Los Angeles in 1897, where he developed the Homer Laughlin Building on Broadway, the first fire-proof office building in Southern California. It was also the first reinforced concrete building erected in Southern California. Laughlin was an intimate friend of President William McKinley for over thirty years and presided over the reception committee when McKinley visited Los Angeles.

Laughlin was president of the U.S. Potters' Association for many years. He was a member of the Republican Club of New York, the California Club, Los Angeles, the Allegheny Commandery No. 35, Knights Templar, and an honorary life member of the Girvan Encampment of Glasgow, Knights Templar of Scotland.

The Homer Laughlin China Co. moved all operations to Newell, West Virginia, in 1907. Operations continue in that location today as Fiesta Tableware Company.

== Family ==
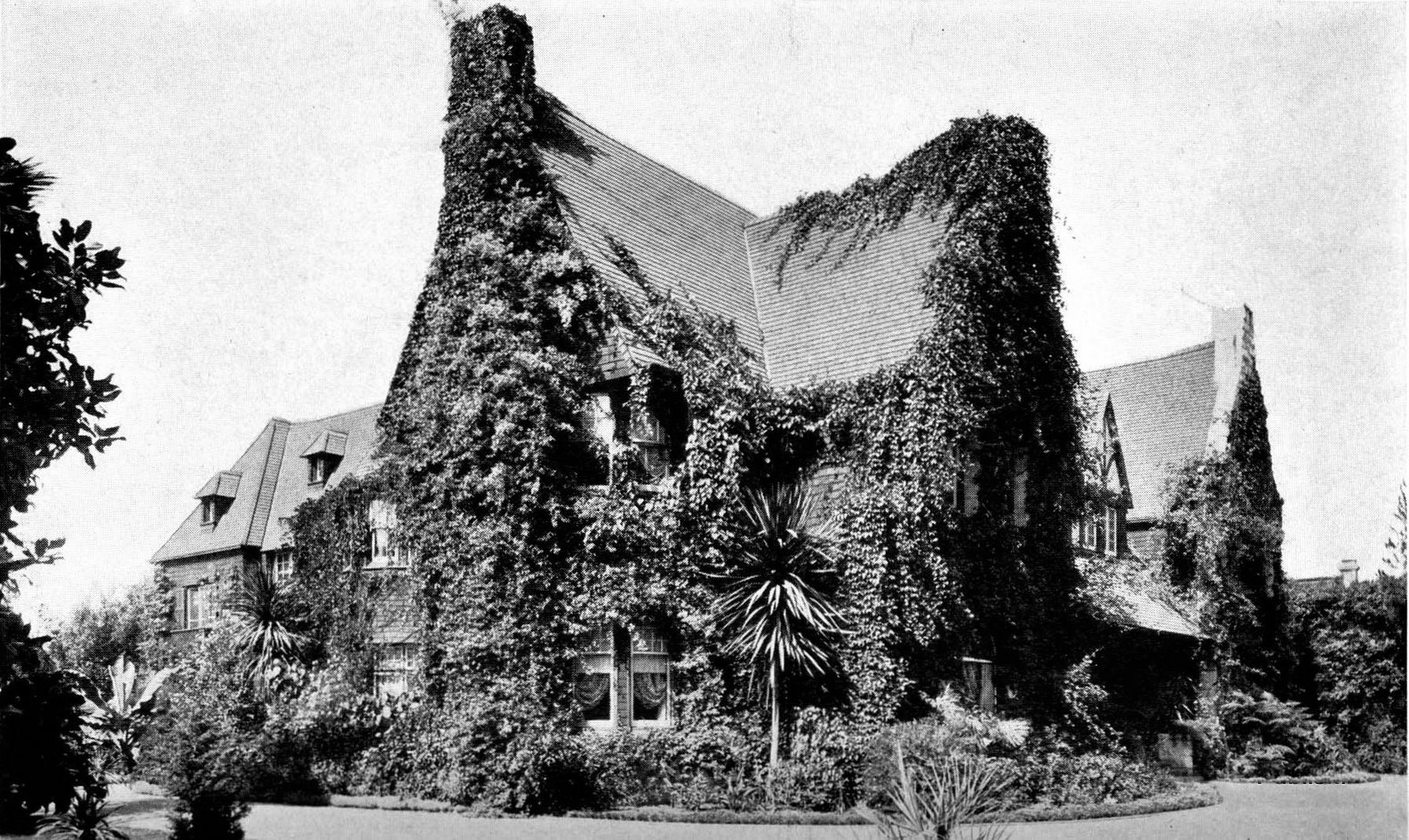
The Laughlin mansion in Los Angeles c. 1906

On June 18, 1875, Laughlin married Cornelia Battenberg (1846–1907) in Wellsville, Ohio. They had three children, Homer Jr., Nanette (1883–1891) and Gwendolyn (1886-May 19, 1942). (Note: There are a number of varying spellings of the children's names in publications of that time from Ohio and California.) Gwendolyn lived in Los Angeles from the age of 10 when her parents retired there. They bought a large mansion, now demolished, at 666 West Adams Boulevard. At one time Gwendolyn was on the board of directors of Children's Hospital Los Angeles. Homer Laughlin Jr. attended Stanford University, where he married Ada Edwards, a physical culture instructor, in the university chapel.

Homer Laughlin died of pneumonia on January 10, 1913, after an operation for appendicitis. He is interred in Inglewood Park Cemetery.
