= Fiesta (dinnerware) =

Line of ceramic glazed dinnerware

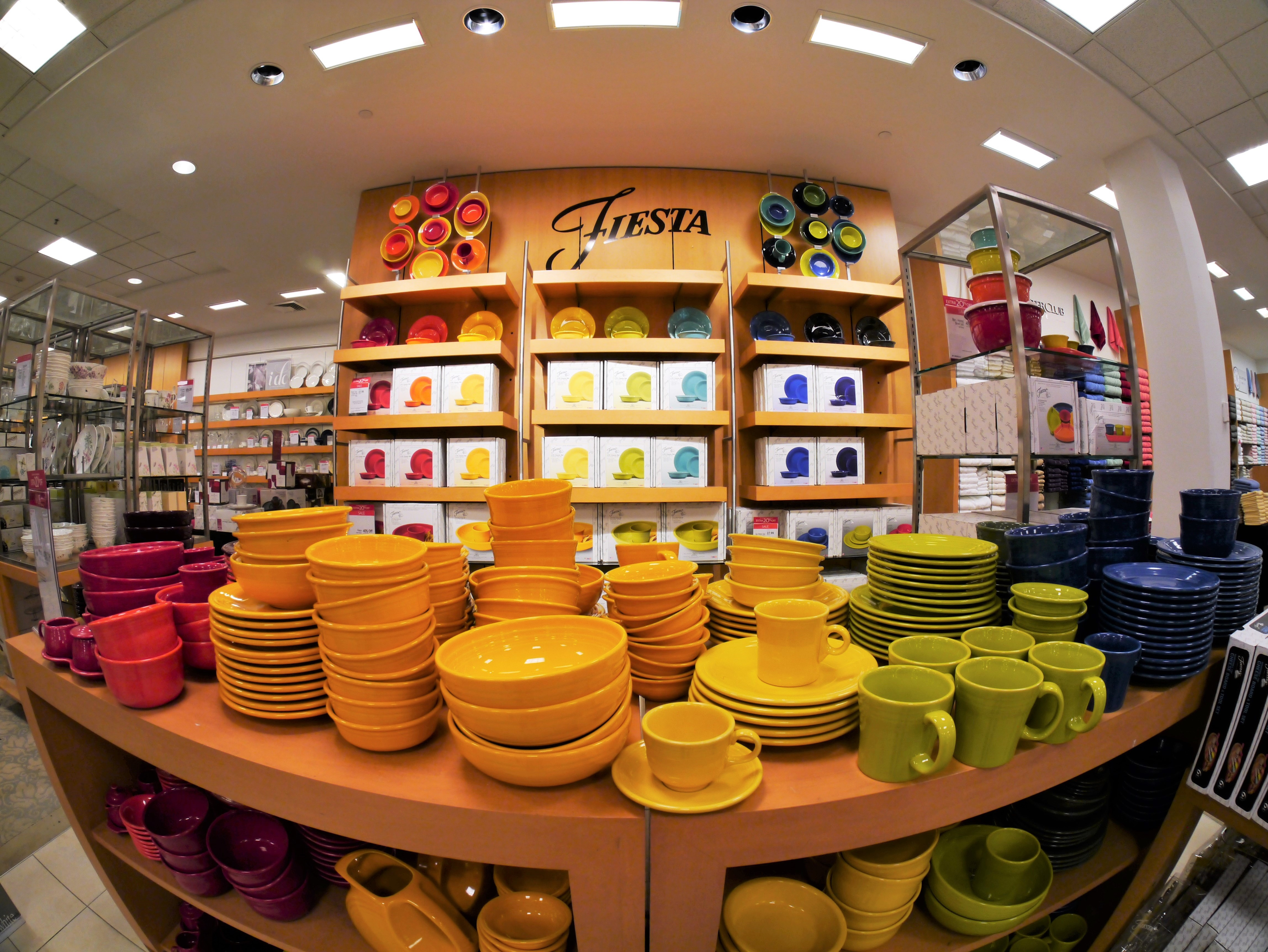
New Fiesta in a store

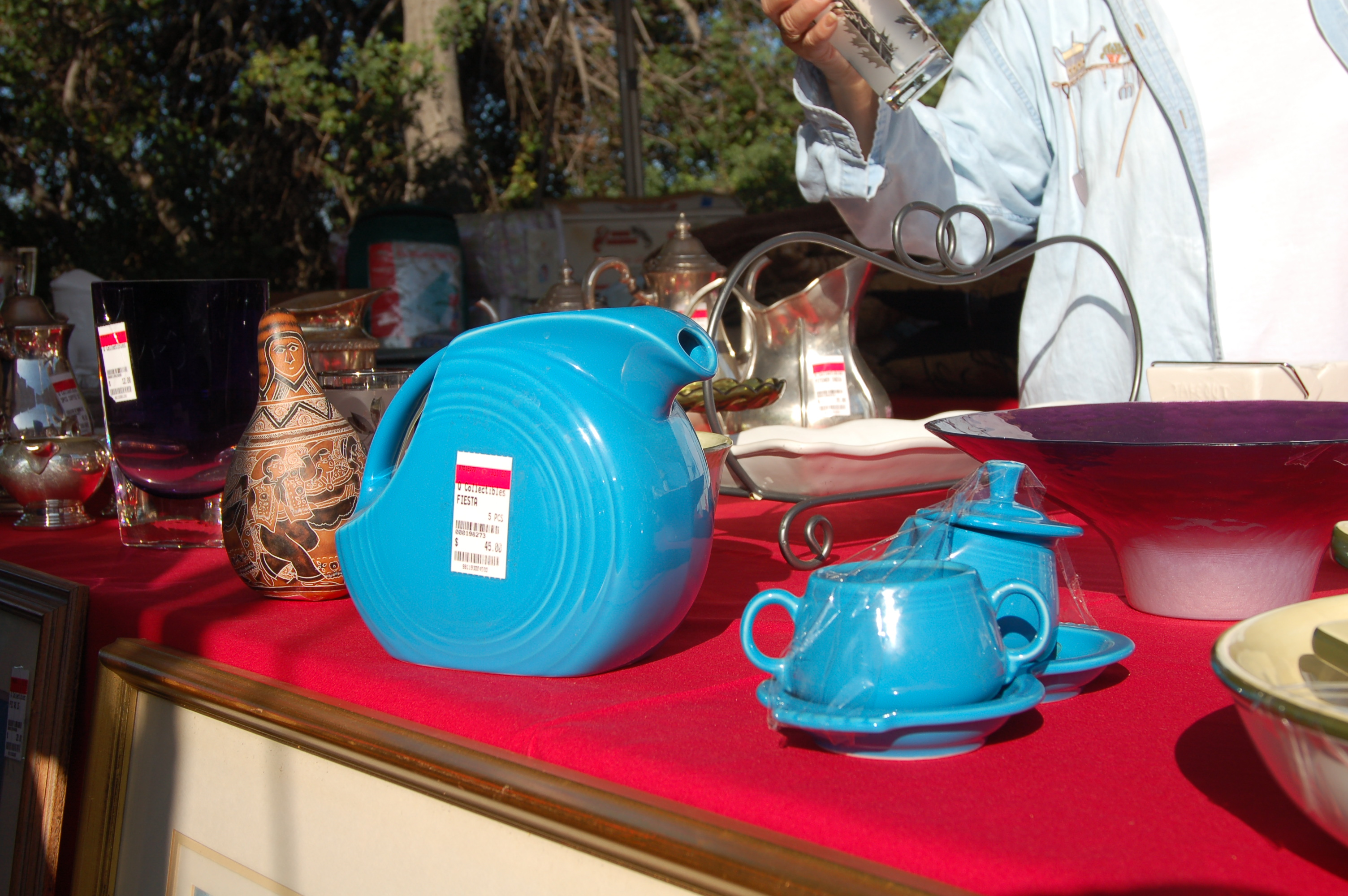
Contemporary Fiesta - 5 pieces for $45 in 2012

Fiesta is a line of ceramic glazed dinnerware manufactured and marketed by the Fiesta Tableware Company of Newell, West Virginia, United States since its introduction in 1936, with a hiatus from 1973 to 1985. Fiesta is noted for its Art Deco styling and its range of often bold, solid colors.

The company was known as the Homer Laughlin China Company (HLCC) until 2020, when it sold its food service divisions, along with the Homer Laughlin name, to Steelite, a British tableware manufacturer. HLCC in turn rebranded itself as the Fiesta Tableware Company, retaining its retail division, prominent Fiesta line, factories and headquarters in Newell, West Virginia.

Fiesta's original shapes and glazes were designed by Frederick Hurten Rhead, Homer Laughlin's art director from 1927 until his death in 1942. Fiesta products before 1986 were semi-vitreous pottery, and after 1986 were vitreous china allowing marketing it for food service applications. Several of the original shapes had to be modified due to this change in material and other new shapes were added by Jonathan O. Parry, who became Homer Laughlin's art director in 1984.

Since its inception, Fiesta has been sold in sets or from "open stock", where customers can select, mix and match pieces from the entire color range. Notably, certain early glazes resulted in pieces that were slightly radioactive.

According to the Smithsonian Institution Press, Fiesta's appeal lies in its colors, design, and affordability. In 2002, The New York Times called Fiesta "the most collected brand of china in the United States".

== Popularity and marketing ==
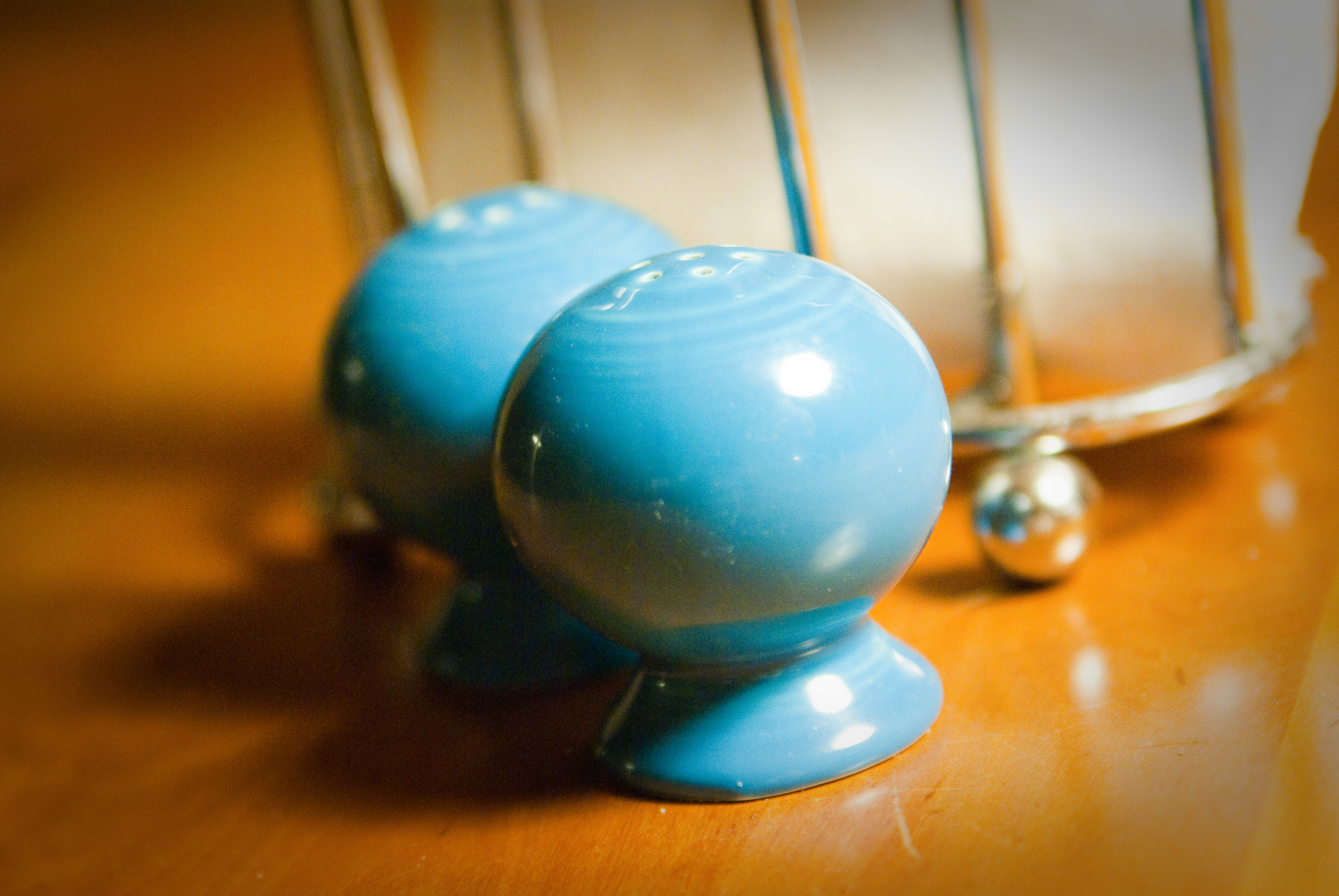
Salt and pepper shakers showing the Art Deco design of Fiesta ware.

Fiesta was introduced at the annual Pottery and Glass Exhibit in Pittsburgh, Pennsylvania in January 1936. It was not the first solid color dinnerware in the US; smaller companies, especially Bauer Pottery in California, had been producing dinnerware, vases, and garden pottery, in solid color glazes for the better part of a decade by the time Fiesta was introduced to the market. However, Fiesta was the first widely mass-promoted and marketed solid-color dinnerware in the US.

Manufacturer's advertisement introducing Fiesta, February 1936

When it was introduced, the decoration of dinnerware and kitchenware ceramics was still inspired by the Victorian era, based on full, predetermined sets of dinnerware, all decorated with the same decal designs. With its solid color glazes and mix-and-match concept, Fiesta represented something radically new to the general public. The forms and surfaces expressed an Art Deco influence. At introduction, the Fiesta line of dinnerware comprised some 37 different pieces, including such occasional pieces as candle holders in two designs, a bud vase, and an ash tray. A set of seven nested mixing bowls ranged in size, from the smallest at five inches in diameter up to a nearly twelve-inch diameter. The company sold basic table service sets for four, six and eight persons, made up of the usual dinner plate, salad plate, soup bowl, and cup and saucer. But the promotion and presentation of Fiesta from the start was as a line of open-stock items from which the individual purchaser could choose to combine serving and place pieces by personal preference and need.

As an early Homer Laughlin Company brochure said:

"COLOR! that's the trend today ..." and it went on to say, "It gives the hostess the opportunity to create her own table effects ... Plates of one color, Cream Soups of another, contrasting Cups and Saucers ... it's FUN to set a table with Fiesta!"

The Homer Laughlin Company quickly added several additional items to the line. During this period some items were modified, and several items were eliminated, including the covered onion soup bowl, and the mixing bowl covers. In the years up to 1940, the line was expanded by the production of more new items. At its most numerous, the Fiesta line comprised approximately 64 different items, including flower vases in three sizes, divided plates, water tumblers, carafes, teapots in two sizes, five part relish trays, and large chop plates in fifteen-inch and thirteen-inch diameters. In addition, it offered several unique promotional items for one dollar each, available only in a predetermined glaze color.

With World War II and the need for manufacturers to focus on production for that effort, non-war related production and public demand declined. Beginning in 1942, the number and variety of items in the Fiesta line began to be reduced. Over the next four years, the more unusual serving pieces were discontinued, and by 1946, the line's variety of items had been reduced by nearly one third. Overall sales of the more typical place-setting pieces of Fiesta remained strong and reportedly peaked around 1948. The popularity of Fiesta was due to its bright colors, durable construction, stylized art deco shapes and designs, and its promotion through mass marketing. From its first introduction in 1936 and for over a decade, Fiesta products were a widespread fad. The dinnerware became something of a status symbol for late 1930s and pre-war 1940s middle-class households. Today, vintage Fiesta trades briskly on auction websites and at other antique/vintage product sales venues.

== 1936–1969 ==
The line name and design is still owned by the Fiesta Tableware Company, formerly called the Homer Laughlin China Company of Newell, West Virginia, which was the original company that produced and marketed it. Except for minor adjustments due to manufacturing requirements, the design of the original shapes remained virtually unchanged from 1936 to 1969. As home decorating color styles changed, the company did change the solid color glaze assortment offered. The texture of the original glazes, and throughout the life of vintage Fiesta, was semi-opaque. This is smooth and glossy, but without any shining glare, rather more like an eggshell. The ware sometimes shows "glaze curtains", areas of uneven glazing where a heavier application meets a lighter one.

At its introduction in 1936, Fiesta was produced in five colors:

- Red (orange red) (1936–1943, 1959–1972),
- Blue (cobalt) (1936–1950) [This color had the same name as a contemporary production color, but was lighter, bluer, less dark],
- Green (light green) (1936–1950),
- Yellow (deep golden) (1936–1969), [This color had the same name as a contemporary production color, now discontinued, but was much darker in tone],
- Old Ivory (yellowish cream) (1936–1950).

By 1938, two years into production, a sixth color was added:

- Turquoise (robin's egg blue) (1938–1969) [This color also had the same name as a contemporary production color but was less greenish].

With the exception of the Red, this color assortment remained in production until about 1950. The first known company price list showing the new colors is dated 1951. The original Red had been discontinued before 1944 (see below).

The discontinuation of red, plus the general changes in society due to the United States' participation in World War II, caused a slump in sales of the larger serving pieces from the early 1940s. Prior to this reduction in the number of shapes offered, only one or two very specialized shapes had been discontinued such as covered onion soup bowls and covers for the nested mixing bowls and those had been discontinued by 1938. These early discontinued items, especially the covered onion soup bowls in the turquoise glaze and mixing bowl covers in any color, are today quite rare.

By 1950, after the end of the second World War and with the housing boom of returning GIs, home decorating styles and colors had changed. The manufacturer decided to retire some original glaze colors and replace them with four new modern colors in keeping with the changing decorative style.

The original Yellow and Turquoise of the prior decade remained in production but were augmented by four new colors:

- Rose (dark brownish pink) (1950–1959),
- Gray (medium) (1950–1959),
- Forest (dark green) (1950–1959),
- Chartreuse (bright yellowish green) (1950–1959).

Thus the company continued to offer six colors as it had done through most of Fiesta's first decade.

Through the 1950s sales of Fiesta continued to decrease from its first boom years of the 1930s. The company reduced its offering of items. But when in 1959 the United States government released its block on uranium, which enabled the manufacturer to once again produce the original bright orange-red glaze (see below), the company saw an opportunity to revive sales. The company discontinued the four new glazes of the previous decade in favor of the re-introduced original bright orange-red color, which along with the original yellow and turquoise colors, and a newly introduced bright green color were the four glaze color assortment offered to the public in 1959. This new shade of green was officially simply called

- Green (1959–1969) but has been nick-named "medium green" by collectors to distinguish it from the other earlier greens. The Medium Green is a bright, almost Kelly green. Some have described it as a "John Deere Tractor" green.

This final four color glaze assortment of original Fiesta continued in production until 1969.

Although this color assortment was available and sold for ten years (1959–1969), the popularity of Fiesta had fallen. Because overall sales of the line had decreased, this newest shade of green is seen as in very short supply on the secondary market relative to the other glaze colors. Both Yellow and Turquoise had been in continuous production since the earliest days, and Red had previously been in production, so on the secondary market those colors were more easily available. The last glaze color, called Medium Green was only produced during that decade, and so with less overall sales of the line, there was proportionally less product sold in this glaze color. As a consequence it has gained almost mythical status and, for certain pieces in this glaze, commands astronomical prices wholly disproportionate to the rest of the line.

The Yellow glaze is the one glaze that was in production throughout the life of vintage Fiesta. Turquoise, while not strictly an original color (having been introduced about a year into Fiesta's production) was otherwise also in continuous production until the end of the original vintage era in 1969. Red, while an original color at the line's introduction, was removed from the market before 1944 (see below). Although it was brought back into production from 1959 to 1969, this was after most of the unusual serving pieces had long been discontinued. Red pieces also usually command a premium price in the secondary market, both for its vibrancy in the mix of colors and for its scarcity due to limited years of production. While many collectors love all the colors, some only want those of the "Original 6" or "Fifties Colors".

== Radioactive glazes ==
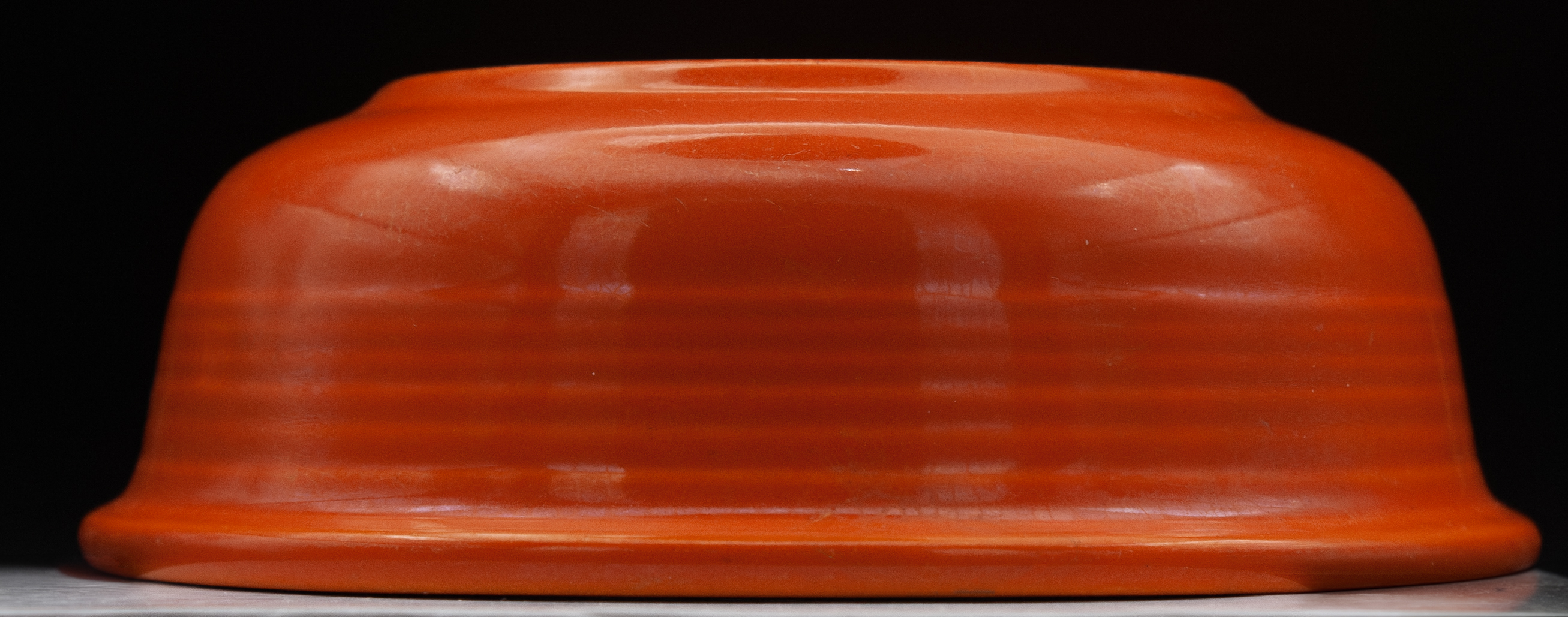
Side view of a uranium-glazed bowl

Geiger counter (kit without housing) audibly reacting to an orange Fiestaware shard.

Brilliant red Fiesta (and indeed the red glazes produced by all U.S. potteries of the era) is known for having a detectable amount of uranium oxide in its glaze, which produced the orange-red color. During World War II, the government took control of uranium for development of the atom bomb, and confiscated the company's stocks. Homer Laughlin discontinued Fiesta red in 1944. The company reintroduced Fiesta red in 1959 using depleted uranium (with 60% of the radioactivity of natural uranium), after the Atomic Energy Commission relaxed its restrictions on uranium oxide. In addition to pottery glazing, uranium oxide was used even more extensively in the tiling industry, producing uranium tile.

Red is not the only color of vintage ceramic glaze that is radioactive; it is detectable from other colors, including ivory. The level of radioactivity of vintage fiestaware has been published and is available online.

The U.S. Environmental Protection Agency warns consumers not to use radioactive glazed ceramics for food or drink use. Others recommend against using such pieces for food storage due to the possibility of leaching of uranium or other heavy metals (often present in some colored glazes) into food, especially acidic foods. Consumption of uranium from regular use of such dishware, estimated by the U.S. Nuclear Regulatory Commission, amounted to potential doses of about 0.4 mSv per year (compare to 1 mSv/year general public exposure limit).

== 1969–1973 ==
By 1969 home decorating tastes had again changed. The company restyled the shapes of Fiesta to try to modernize it. Finials on covers, handles on cups, bowl contours and shapes, were all modified to give Fiesta a more contemporary appearance. The glaze colors were also changed, with the choices being limited to three colors for the place-setting pieces, and one color for the five major serving pieces. These were the remainder of the 64-piece assortment of shapes. Although essentially the same Red glaze as had then been available since 1959, it was renamed Mango Red. Replacing Yellow, Turquoise, and Medium Green, were two new glaze colors. One was Turf Green, which nearly matched the popular Avocado color of the day. The second color was Antique Gold, a brownish-yellow which nearly matched the popular Harvest Gold of the era. The line's name was changed to "Fiesta Ironstone". The shape redesigns and color changes did not restore Fiesta's popularity, and in January 1973 the company discontinued the Fiesta line.

== Decaled and decorated Fiesta shapes ==
As is common with many dinnerware shapes, the manufacturers add different decals to the shapes and give them new names. Throughout its long life (1936–1973), the item shapes of Fiesta were often decorated with decals and marketed under other names, or a name variation. One example was "Fiesta Casuals", which consisted of two patterns, one with yellow and brown florals and accented with solid color Fiesta yellow items, the other with turquoise and brown florals and accented with solid color Fiesta turquoise items.

As another example, in the late 1960s, the shapes of Fiesta were glazed in a dark 'bean-pot' brown, flat pieces were given an underglaze 'Mediterranean-style' geometric decal in black, and the line was marketed as "Amberstone" in a supermarket promotion. Later these shapes were glazed in Antique Gold, with a different stylized pattern under the glaze. This line was dubbed "Casualstone" for another supermarket promotion.

== Collectors and the secondary market ==
During the 1970s, a new appreciation for Art Deco designs from the 1920s and 1930s flourished. Along with this, the baby boomers were establishing their own households. They made Fiesta popular once again. Almost immediately after Fiesta was discontinued in January 1973, collectors began buying heavily in second-hand shops and the newly popular garage sales. Another avenue for acquiring pieces, and sometimes entire collections, was through local auctions. Due to the enormous popularity of Fiesta in the secondary market, its prices skyrocketed. By the end of the 1970s and into the 1980s, some Fiesta items once costing pennies were commanding hundreds of U.S. dollars for scarcer items. By the mid-1980s, prices had climbed higher. Certain very rare pieces and colors were being traded for thousands of dollars.

== Contemporary Fiesta from 1986 ==
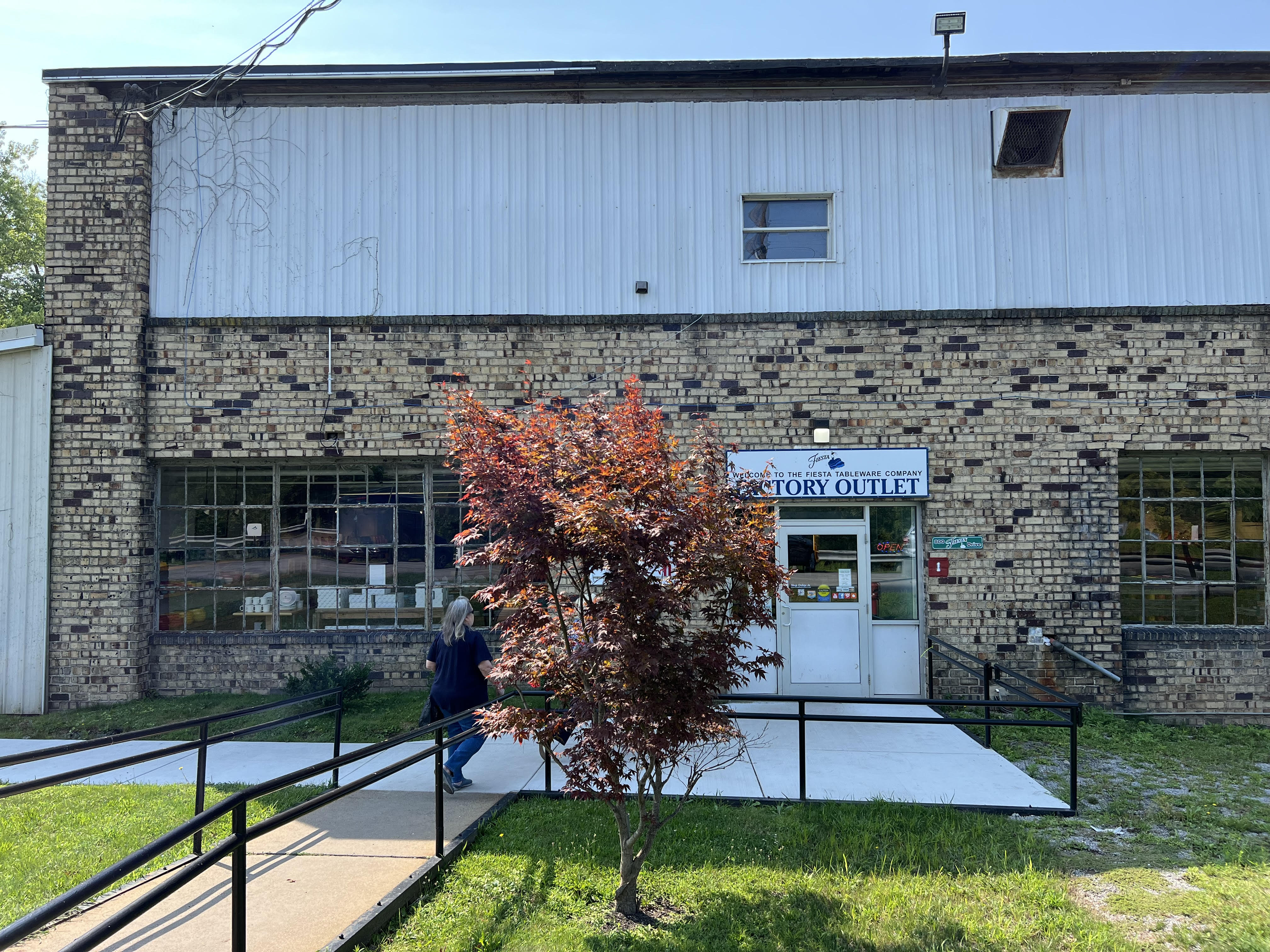
Fiesta outlet store at the Fiesta factory in Newell, West Virginia

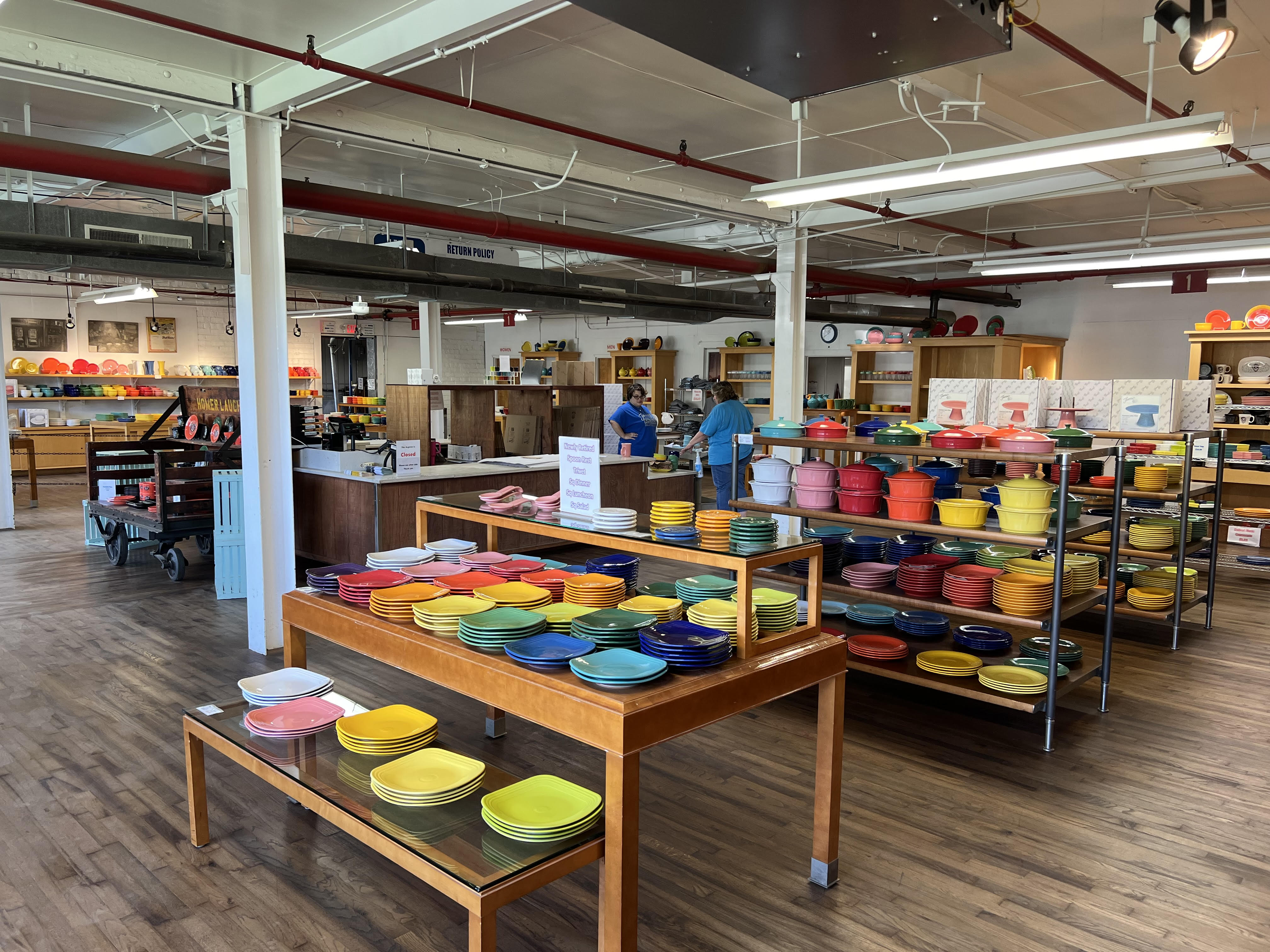
Fiesta outlet store at the Fiesta factory in Newell, West Virginia

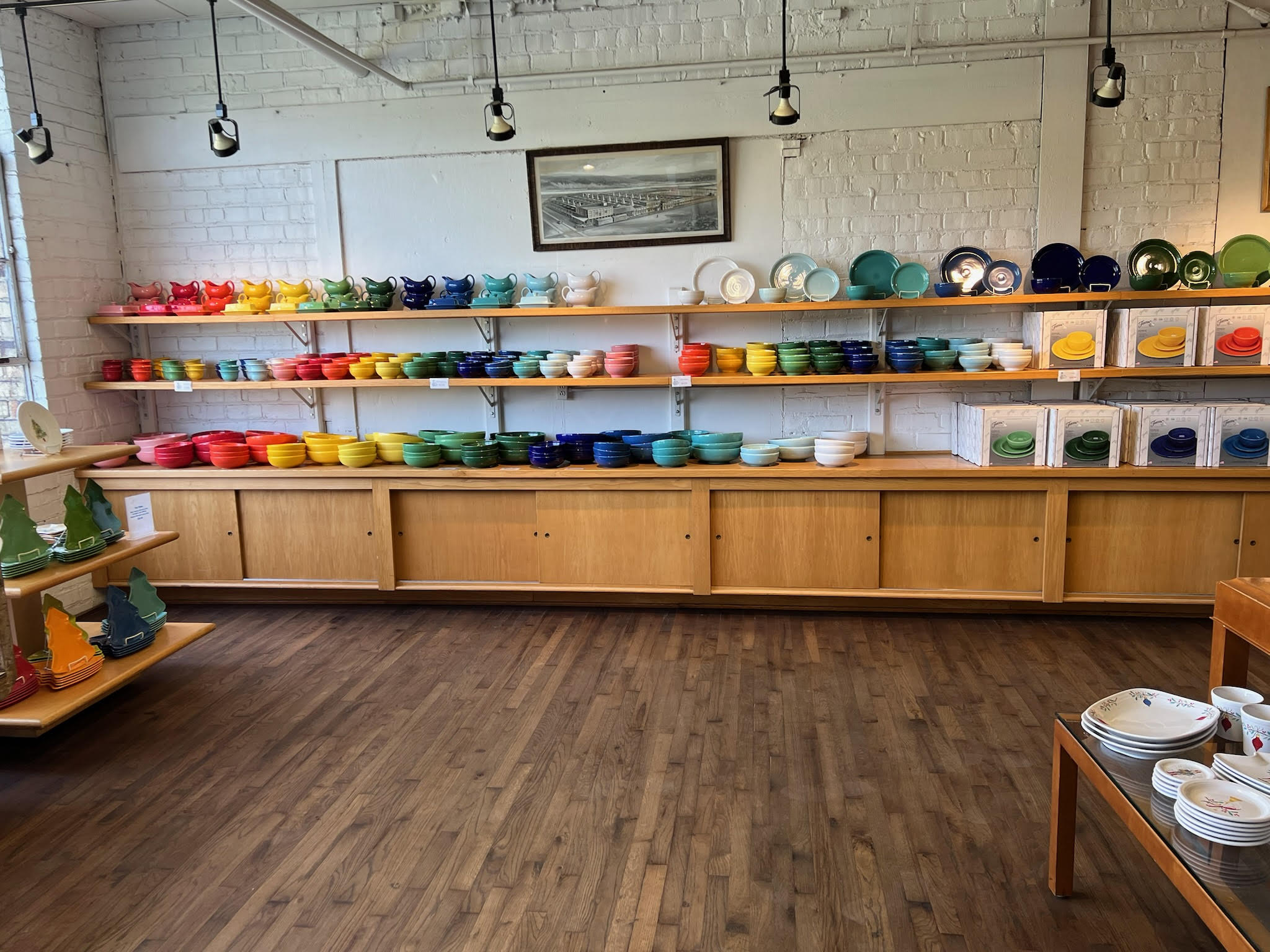
Wall of Fiesta dishes in Fiesta factory store in Newell, West Virginia

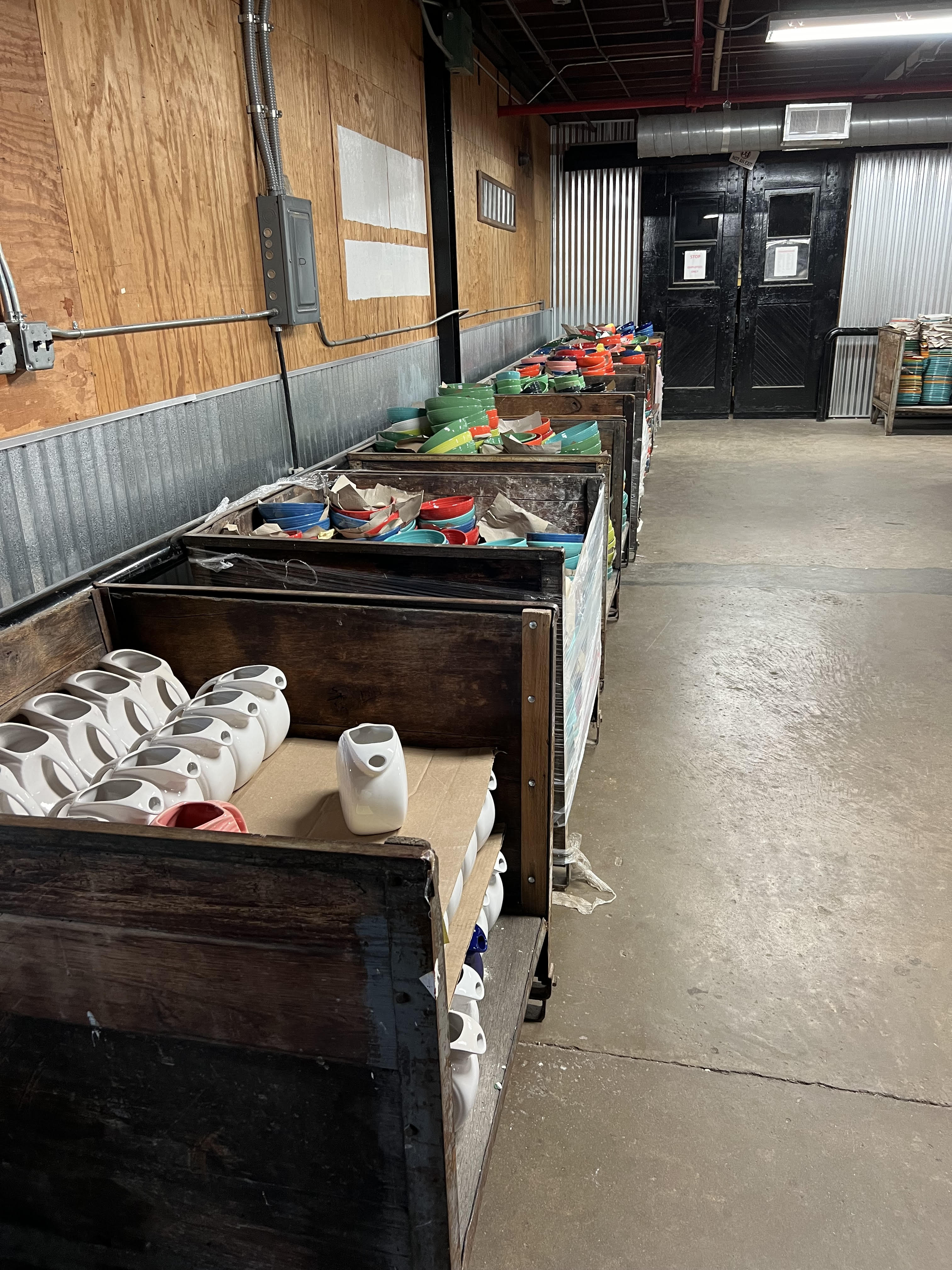
Pallets of factory seconds at the Fiesta factory store in Newell, West Virginia

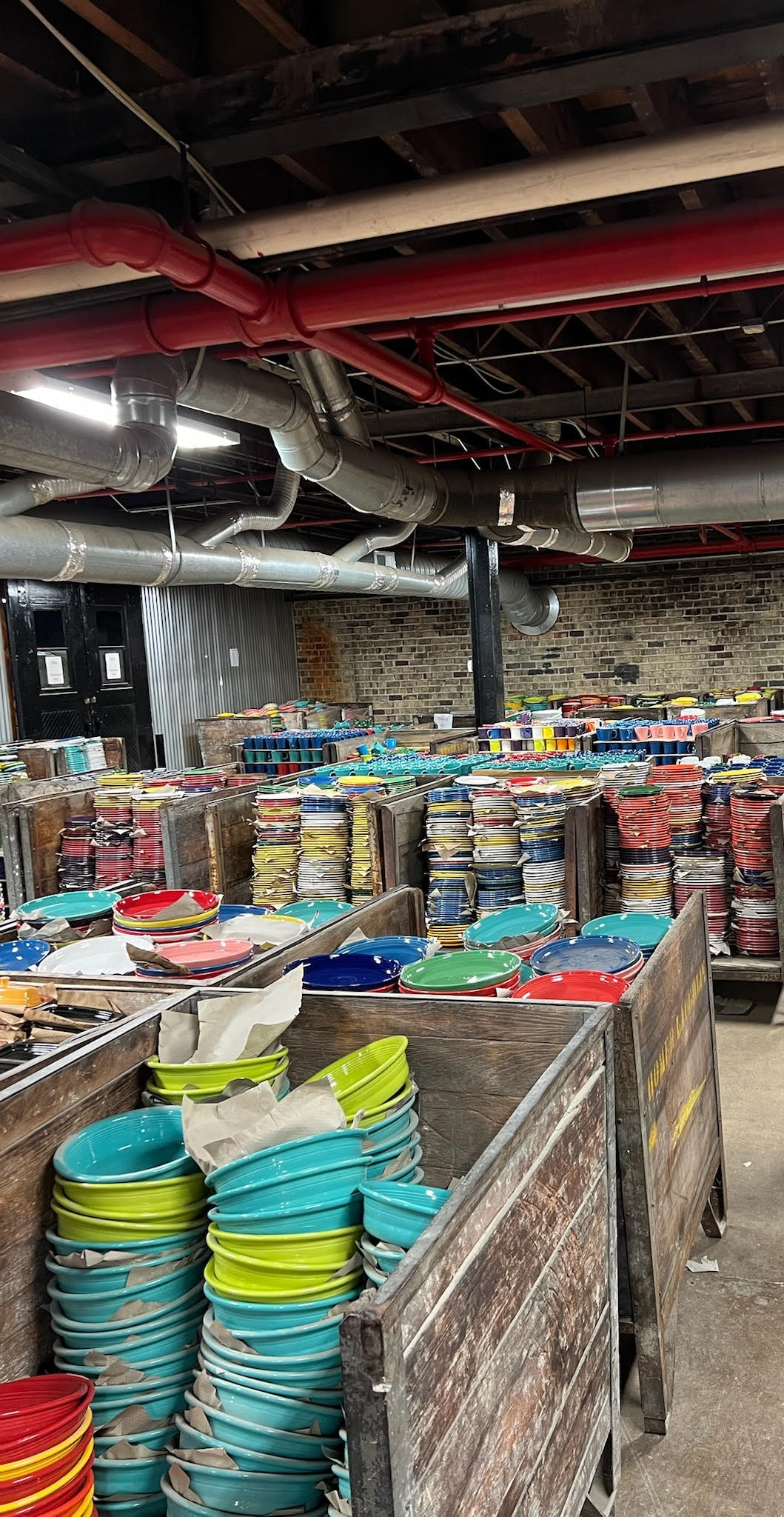
Pallets of seconds at Fiesta factory store in Newell, West Virginia

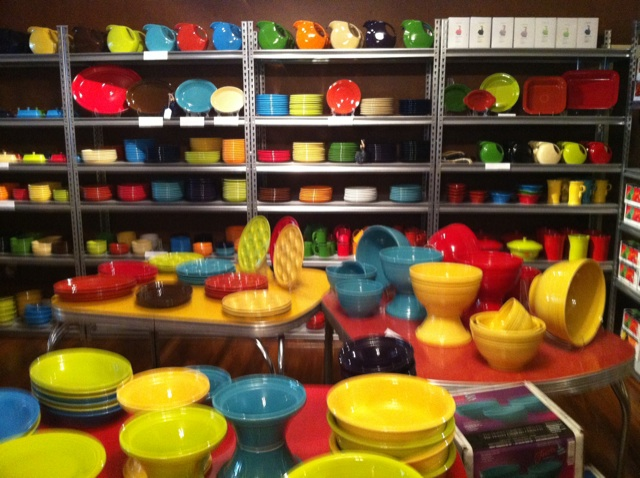
A display of Fiesta

The Homer Laughlin China Company noticed the activity on the secondary market. After a production lapse of 13 years, in 1986 the company marked the 50th anniversary of Fiesta by its reintroduction. Prior to mass production and promotion, Laughlin used the original semi-vitreous clay body on shapes taken mostly from the last incarnation of vintage Fiesta (1969–1973). The company then changed the body to a fully vitrified clay, to enable marketing to the restaurant and service industry, as this clay was more durable. Many original shapes required a redesign because of shrinkage associated with the new clay. Although old and new runs appear similar, direct comparison demonstrates the newer pieces (made with the fully vitrified clay body) are noticeably smaller. In addition to redesigns, new shapes were added to the line.

In 1986, Laughlin offered five colors:

- Rose (pink) (1986–2005) [This color changed significantly in the post-2000 firings but was still considered the same Rose],
- Black (black) (1986–2015),
- Cobalt (dark navy blue) (1986–2021),
- White (bright stark white) (1986–),
- Apricot (pale pinkish tan) (1986–1998).

The glaze texture on this new Fiesta is very smooth, hard and much more glossy than the original Fiesta. Since its introduction, new Fiesta has remained popular. In addition, it has increased collector interest in all the lines. Many people are collecting vintage pieces, as well as purchasing new items from department stores and catalog retailers. Fiesta collectors often add this new ware to existing collections of vintage Fiesta, while others concentrate on buying only from the new assortment (the original run of Fiestaware, like most dinnerware of the era, was produced with significantly high levels of lead in the glaze). Early in Fiesta's second incarnation, the Homer Laughlin Company marketed it as a new collectible. The manufacturer has maintained interest in Fiesta and manipulated the collectors' market over the past 34 years by discontinuing glaze colors, and by limiting production quantities on some items, or controlling production time frames. Similar techniques have been used by numerous other housewares, china, silver, toy, ornament, etc. companies.

The Homer Laughlin China Company has produced new Fiesta in a total of 340 glaze colors, none of which matches exactly any of the thirteen colors of vintage Fiesta. As of early 2026, many Fiesta shapes exist in a total of 40 color glazes. In addition to the first five 'Post 86' glazes, the names of the new color glazes, in order of introduction, are:

- Yellow (pale custard/butter) (1987–2002),
- Turquoise (more greenish than vintage Turquoise) (1988–),
- Periwinkle (slightly lavenderish-blue) (1989–2006),
- Sea Mist (pale mint green) (1991–2005),
- Lilac (soft purple) (1993–1995),
- Persimmon (pinkish-orange) (1995–2008),
- Sapphire (medium bright blue) (Bloomingdale's exclusive 1996–1997),
- Chartreuse (brighter and greener than vintage Chartreuse) (1997–1999),
- Pearl Gray (light gray) (1999–2001),
- Juniper (dark bluish-green) (2000–2001),
- Cinnabar (brownish-burgundy) (2000–2010),
- Sunflower (bright yellow) (2001–2026),
- Plum (dark purple) (2002–2016),
- Shamrock (bright deep green) (2002–2021),
- Tangerine (bright orange) (2003–2018),
- Scarlet (deep true red) (2004–),
- Peacock (bright blue) (2005–2015),
- Heather (dark reddish-purple) (2006–2009),
- Evergreen (dark green) (2007–2009),
- Ivory (egg shell/off white) (2008–),
- Chocolate (brown) (2008–2012),
- Lemongrass (yellowish chartreuse) (2009–2024),
- Paprika (dark rust) (2010–2017),
- Marigold (yellowish-orange), HLC's 75th Anniversary Fiesta color - limited 75-week run (2011–2012)
- Flamingo (bright true pink) (2012–2013),
- Lapis (denim blue) (2013–), announced March 2, 2013
- Poppy (bright reddish-orange) (2014–), announced March 15, 2014
- Sage (earthy green) (2015–2019), announced March 7, 2015
- Slate (charcoal grey) (2015–2022), announced March 7, 2015
- Claret (red wine) (2016–2018), announced March 5, 2016
- Daffodil (vibrant golden yellow) (2017–), announced January 10, 2017
- Mulberry (deep purple) (2018–2024), announced January 9, 2018
- Meadow (deep mint green) (2019–), announced January 8, 2019
- Butterscotch (orange yellow) (2020–2024), announced January 12, 2020
- Twilight (deep cobalt blue) (2021–2026), announced January 13, 2021
- Peony (blush pink) (2022–), announced January 11, 2022
- Jade (dark green) (2023–), announced January 10, 2023
- Sky (pale blue) (2024–), announced January 16, 2024
- Linen (unglazed, sand) (2025–), announced January 15, 2025 (As this color is simply Fiestaware not glazed with a color coat, unofficially produced pieces older than 2025 can be found)
- Lavender (soft purple) (2026–), announced January 13, 2026

=== Special edition colors ===
Since the reintroduction of Fiesta in 1986, Homer Laughlin has introduced three colors which were each available for only two years: Lilac (1993–1995), Chartreuse (1997–1999) and Juniper (2000–2001). Sapphire was sold exclusively at Bloomingdale's from 1996 to 1997. In November 2008, Homer Laughlin released the limited-edition color, Chocolate. The color of milk chocolate, the new shade added a second neutral tone to Fiesta's color palette. It was available for a limited period of time and on a limited number of pieces.

In 1997, 500 limited-edition presentation bowls in an exclusive Raspberry (reddish maroon) colored glaze were made to commemorate the production of the 500 millionth piece of dinnerware carrying the name Fiesta produced by the Homer Laughlin China Company since 1936. In anticipation of Fiesta's 75th anniversary in 2011, Homer Laughlin announced its 75th anniversary color: Marigold. In addition, it introduced the first of a line of specially backstamped annual anniversary items, a set of three baking bowls, at the 2008 International Home and Housewares Show in Chicago, Illinois. This was followed by the introduction of a large serving platter in 2009 and a numbered soup tureen. Dinnerware and accessories were available in 2011–2012, with each introduction marketed for 75 weeks, beginning April 1, before being retired.

As an indication of its influence, Fiesta was featured in a design exhibit at the Cooper-Hewitt Museum in New York City in 1988.

=== Square Fiesta dinnerware ===
In 2009, a new line of square Fiesta dinnerware was introduced. Square is available as dinner, luncheon and salad plates, 19 oz. bowls and mugs, four-piece place settings, as well as a full line of accessories. Despite square silhouettes, pieces maintain a strong relationship to the company's established 'round' deco offering; coupe shape and height remain the same, along with the brand's signature concentric rings.

In October 2016, the Homer Laughlin Company announced the discontinuation of the square bowl (992) and the square mug (923).

== In popular culture ==
American Fiesta, a one-man play, refers to the central character's obsession with collecting vintage Fiesta dinnerware.

== See also ==
- Bauer Pottery
- Franciscan Ceramics
- Metlox
- Pacific Clay
- Uranium glass
- Uranium tile
- Vernon Kilns
