= The Hall China Company =

Yellow butter or cheese refrigerator storage box

- Type: Private, later subsidiary
- Industry: Ceramics
- Founded: August 14, 1903; 123 years ago
- Founders: Robert Hall
- Defunct: February 28, 2021; 5 years ago
- Headquarters: East Liverpool, Ohio, U.S.

The Hall China Company was an American ceramics manufacturer in East Liverpool, Ohio, United States. It was established in 1903 and went defunct in 2021. At the time of its closure, Hall China was one of two potteries under HLC Inc. Hall China has since been produced as a food service line by Steelite International.

== History ==
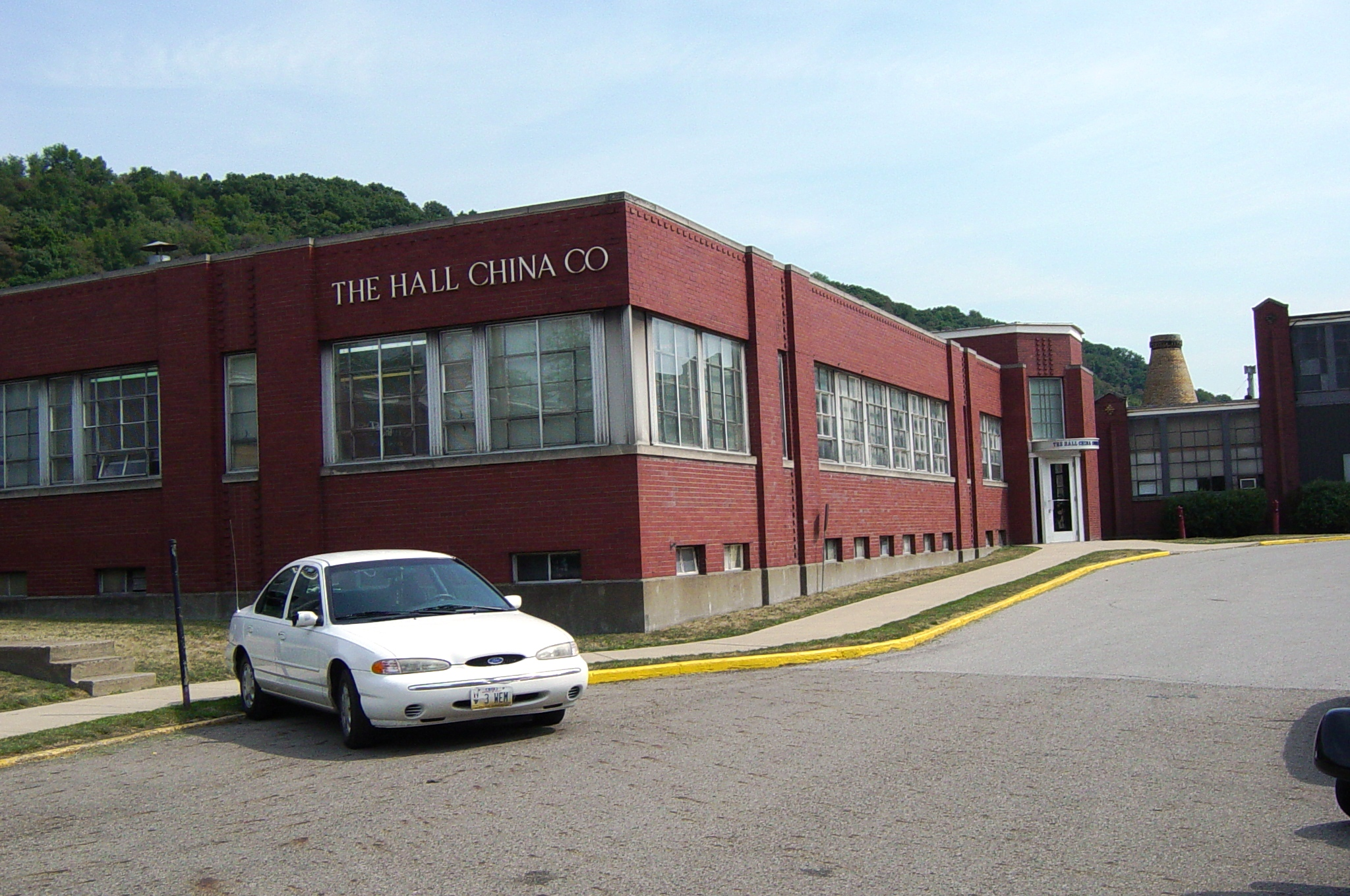
The Hall China Company facility in East Liverpool

Hall China was founded on August 14, 1903, by Robert Hall, in the former West, Hardwick and George Pottery facility, following the dissolution of the two-year-old East Liverpool Potteries Company. He began making dinnerware and toilet seats, but soon found that institutional ware such as bedpans, chamber pots and pitchers was more profitable.

Robert Hall died just a year after launching the company. One of his eight children, Robert Taggart Hall, took over the company and almost immediately began developments to introduce the single-fire process, which had first been used centuries earlier by Chinese potters during their Ming Dynasty (1368–1644). His aim was to change from the two-firing manufacturing method; the first biscuit firing and then the glost firing. With the help of staff chemists and ceramic engineers, Hall experimented from 1904 until 1911, when a success was achieved. The new process fused together the white body, color and glaze when it was fired at a temperature of 2,400 degrees Fahrenheit.

The new glazes allowed the creation of brilliant colors never before seen on American china: 47 colors developed for the new process, which allowed for rapid expansion of the company and its product selections at the onset of World War I. After tepid sales of its new housewares lines in the 1910s, the company tried designing and selling decorated teapots. The teapot business was so successful that the company decided to expand it from the original three designs to a plethora of new shapes and colors. In the 1940s the teapot business began to dwindle. By the 1960s, probably due to the increased preference for coffee by the public, teapot sales had fallen to insignificance.

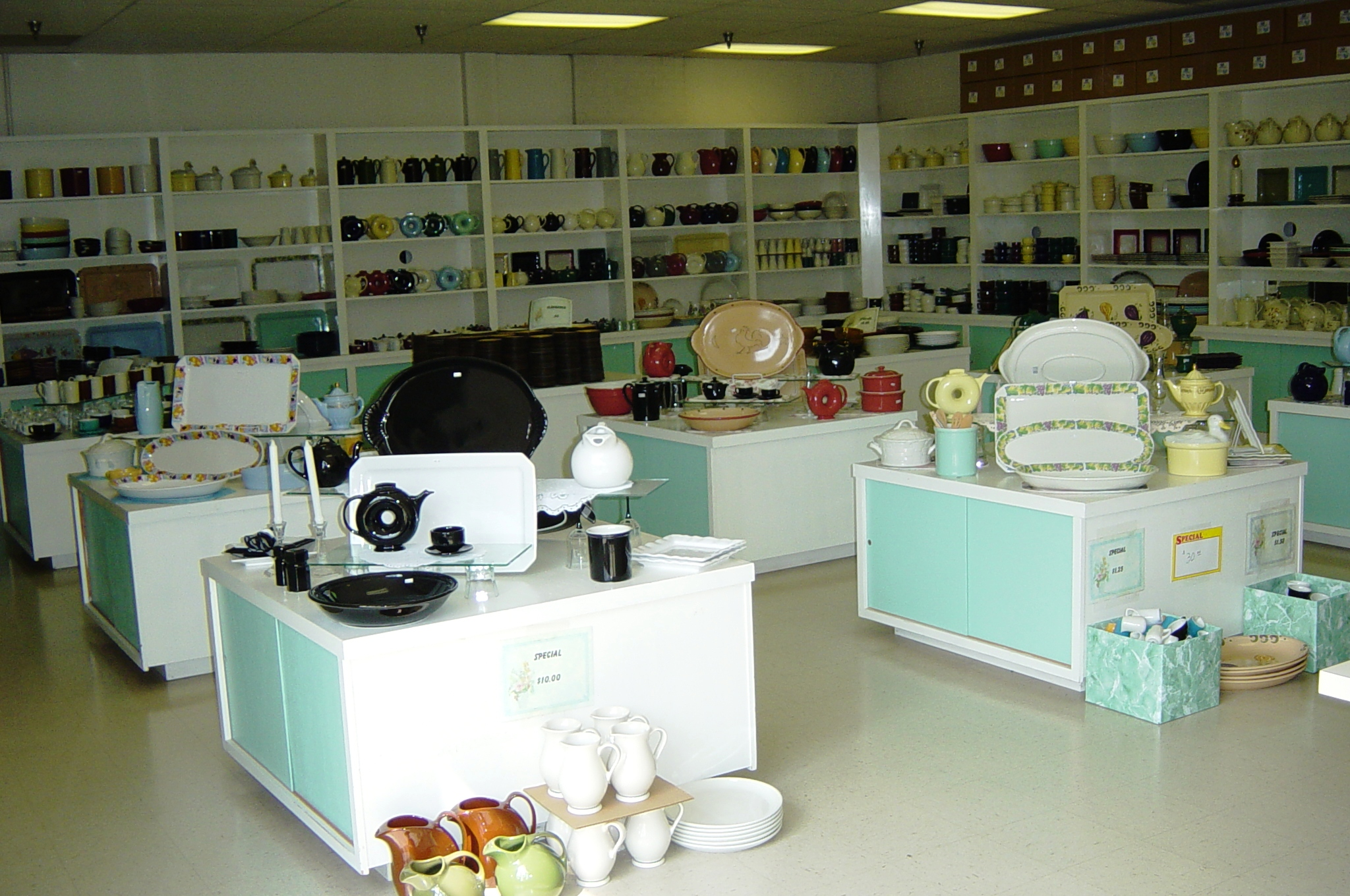
Retailing floor at the Hall Closet, the company's factory outlet store

Hall China celebrated its 100th birthday in 2003 with the publication of A Centennial History of the Hall China Company by Catherine S. Vodrey. In 2010, the Homer Laughlin China Company purchased Hall China. In 2020, it was announced that the Hall China facility would be closed by February 2021 to reduce overhead in the now Fiesta Tableware Company, as the Hall China brand itself had been sold to Steelite International earlier in the year.

== Products ==
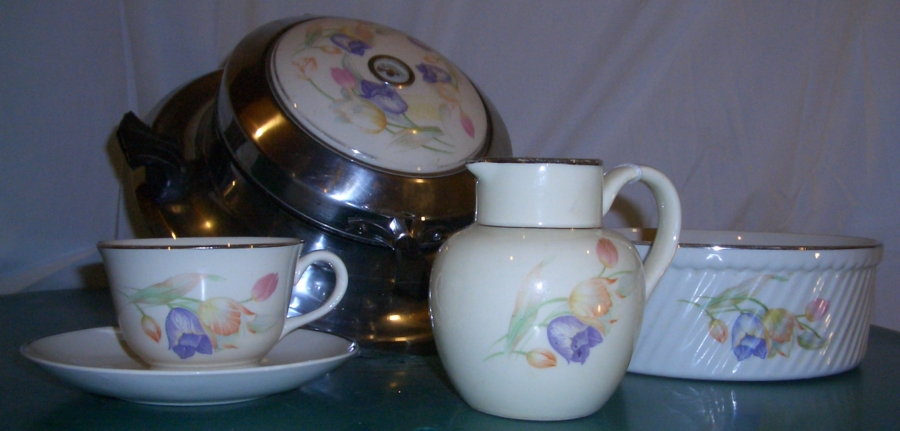
Hall China breakfast set including waffle iron, batter bowl, syrup jug, coffee cup with saucer (waffle iron manufactured by ElectraHot of Minneapolis, Minnesota with Hall China insert)

In the mid-1920s, Hall China started to produce a range of ware exclusively for the Jewel Tea Company. Jewel started using Hall teapots as premiums, and then expanded the promotion to include its own line of distinctive dinnerware and kitchenware. New pieces were introduced by Hall China for Jewel until 1980.

Refrigeratorware became common in the 1930s. Hall produced china pieces for major manufacturers including Hotpoint, General Electric, Montgomery Ward and Westinghouse Electric Corporation. Pieces produced were pitchers, boxes for leftovers, butter and cheese dishes. The Hall pieces either came with the appliance or were offered as accessories to be purchased later.

During the mid-20th century, Hall China produced a number of renowned designs including the Ball and Donut jugs and the Nautilus, Donut and Aladdin teapots. Hall China attracted talented designers, with examples being Eva Zeisel's "Century" and "Tomorrow's Classic" dinnerware, and "Zeisel" tri-color lines and Donald Schreckengost's cookie jars shaped like owls, casserole dishes shaped like ducks, and teapots shaped like Ronald Reagan and Sherlock Holmes.

The company had reissued many of its earlier designs, including some that had previously been considered rare, such as the Airflow and Rhythm teapots, the Donut and Streamline jugs, and some of the water servers from the refrigerator-ware lines. To allay concerns from collectors, the reissued products are marked differently and use different colors.
