= William E. Wells House =

Historic house in West Virginia, United States

- U.S. National Register of Historic Places
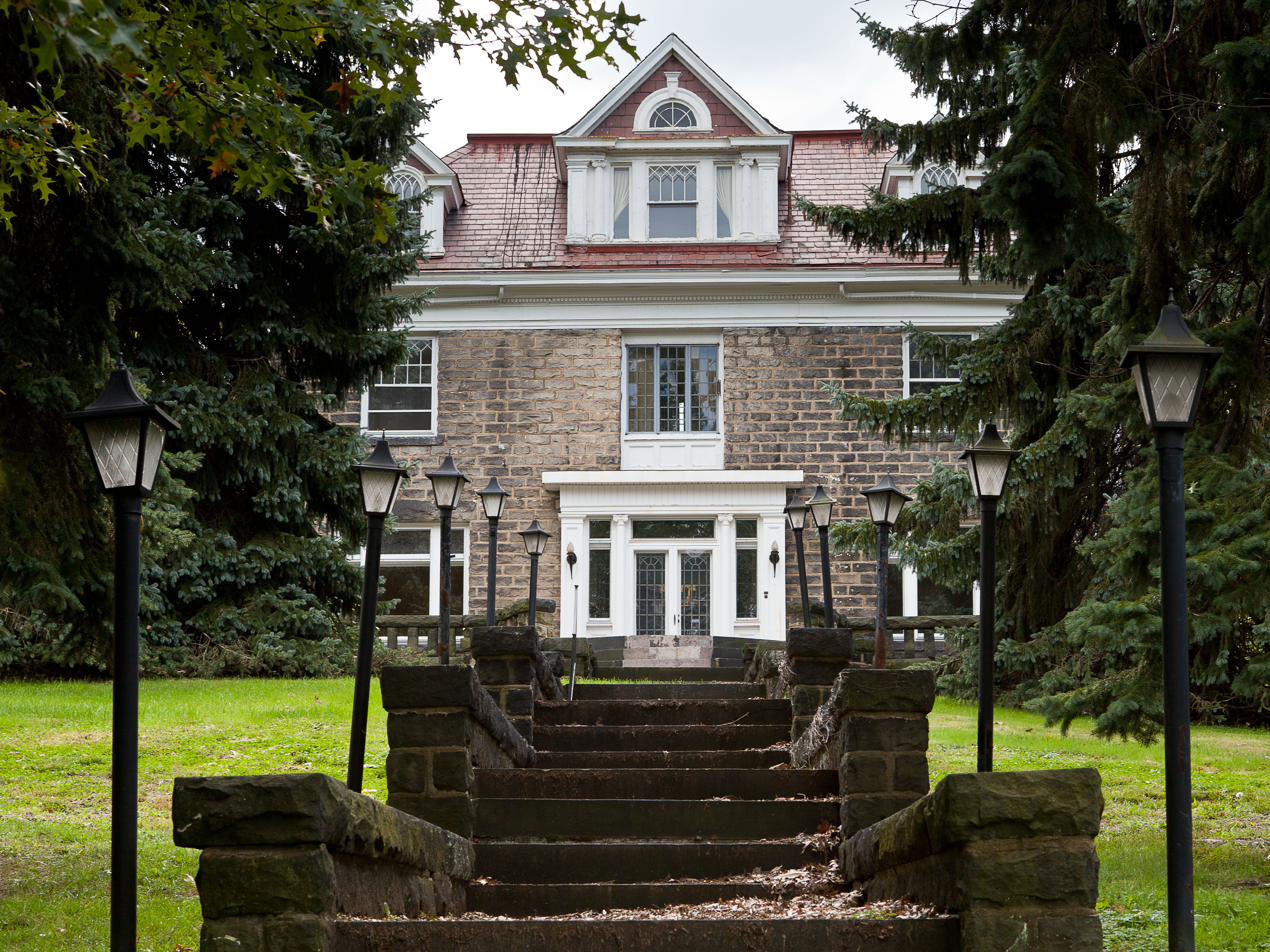
- William E. Wells House, September 2012

- Location within West Virginia Location within the United States
- Location: 372 Virginia Terrace, Newell, West Virginia, U.S.
- Coordinates: 40°36′52.98″N 80°36′3.79″W
- Area: 5 acres (2.0 ha)
- Built: 1907
- Architect: Thayer and Thayer
- Architectural style: Colonial Revival
- NRHP reference No.: 09000244
- Added to NRHP: April 23, 2009

William E. Wells House is a historic home located at Newell, West Virginia, United States. It was built in 1907 and extensively remodeled in 1934–1935. It was listed on the National Register of Historic Places in 2009.

It is a three-story Colonial Revival-style dwelling finished in locally quarried rock-faced ashlar. It features a multiple-pitched slate roof. Also on the property are two garages (c. 1920), two stone entry portals (1907), and a stone sidewalk, portals, and walls (1907). William E. Wells was general manager of the Homer Laughlin Pottery Company.
