= Steelite =

British ceramics and tableware manufacturer

Steelite International
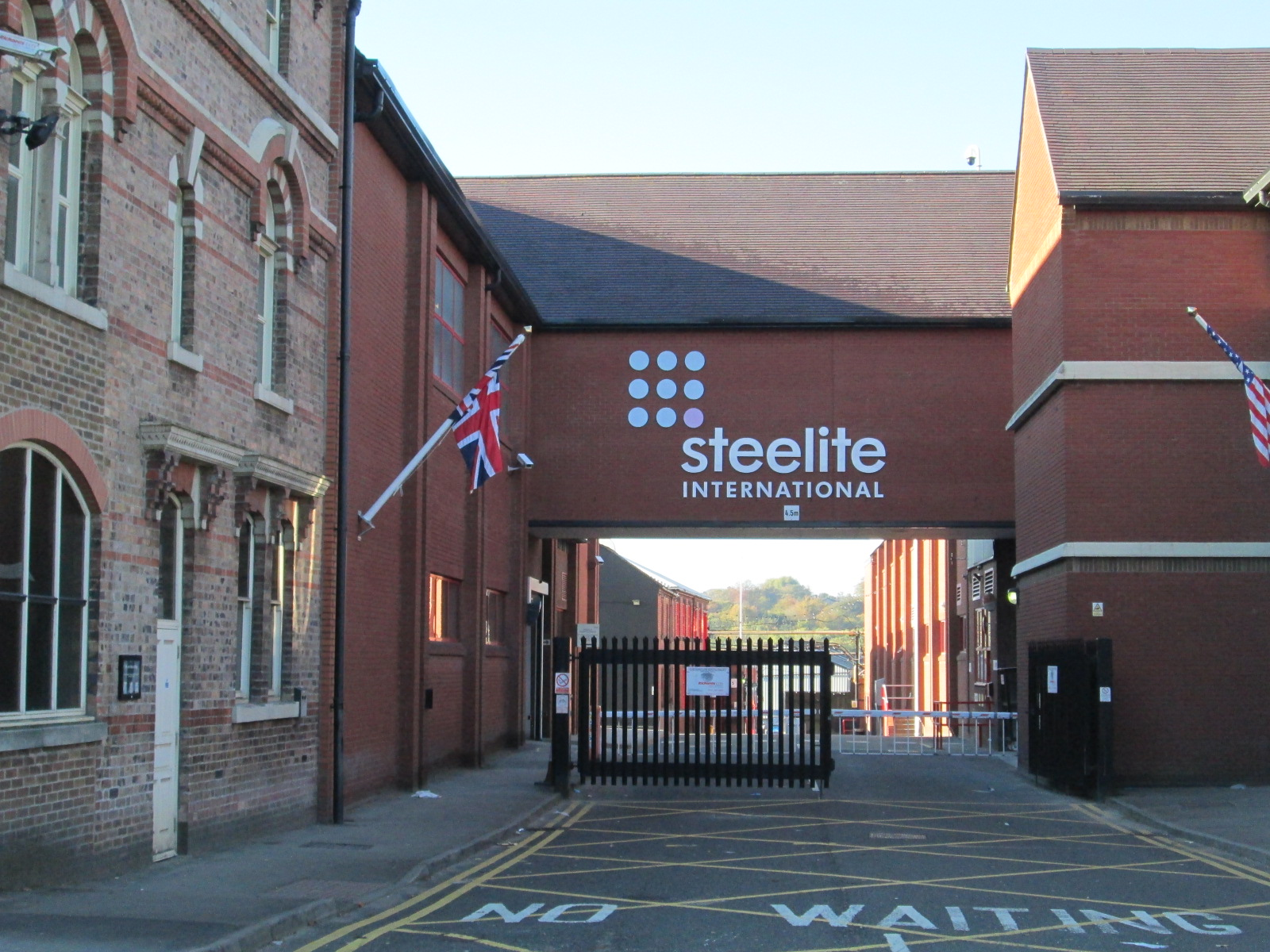
- Steelite factory in Middleport, Staffordshire
- Company type: Private, Subsidiary
- Industry: Ceramics
- Founded: 1983; 43 years ago
- Founders: David Edward Dunn Johnson
- Headquarters: Stoke-on-Trent, Staffordshire, England
- Area served: Worldwide
- Website: www.steelite.com

Steelite International is a British ceramics manufacturer headquartered in Stoke-on-Trent, Staffordshire, England. They specialise in alumina-strengthened vitreous tableware for the hospitality industry.

The company had a turnover of £117 million in 2016. In 2017, it supplied tableware to more than 140 countries, and employed more than 1,000 people. Production output was reported to be around 550,000 pieces per week. Steelite International America is headquartered in Youngstown, Ohio.

== History ==
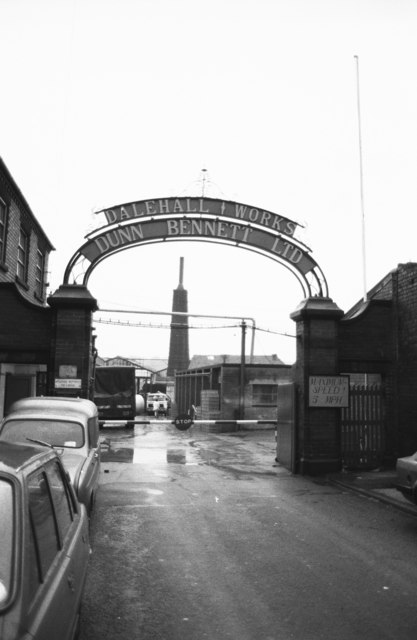
The entrance to Dalehall Works in 1984

Steelite International plc was established in 1983, when David Edward Dunn Johnson bought the hotelware division of Royal Doulton.

The company operates from Dalehall Works and the adjacent Albany Works. Dalehall Works was founded in 1790; from about 1937 to about 1998 it was operated by Dunn Bennett & Co Ltd (a company established in 1876 in Hanley), then by Steelite International.

In March 2020, the food service divisions of the Homer Laughlin China Company and its sister company, the Hall China Company, were acquired by Steelite. The former Homer Laughlin and Hall China manufacturing operations were subsequently renamed The Fiesta Tableware Company. Homer Laughlin's Fiestaware retail line was not part of the sale and will continue to be manufactured at the existing plant in Newell, West Virginia, US.
