= Wayne Six Toll Bridge =

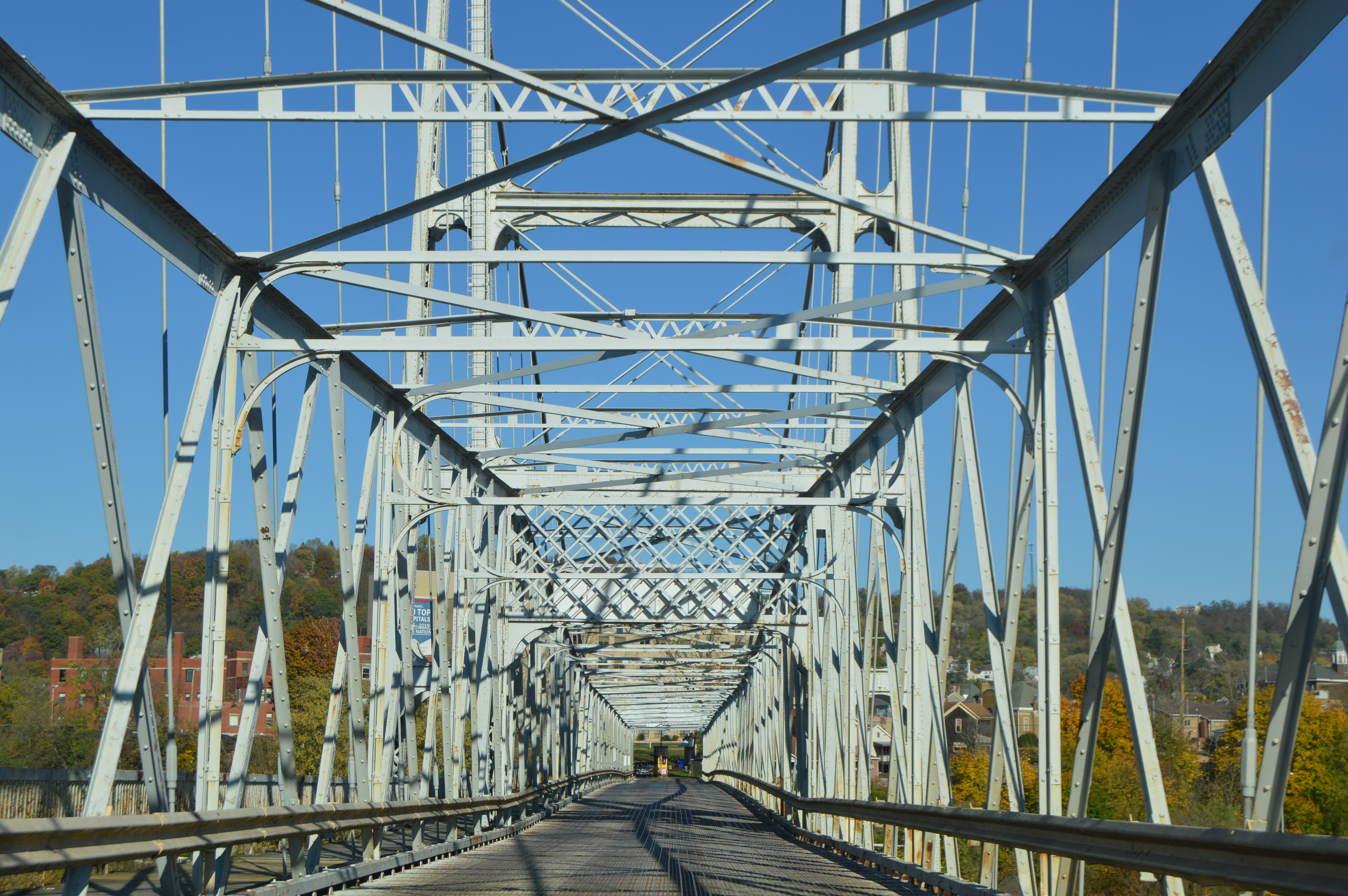
- Crossing toward Ohio
- Coordinates: 40°37′12″N 80°35′20″W
- Carries: 2 lanes of roadway, pedestrians and bicycles
- Crosses: Ohio River
- Locale: East Liverpool, Ohio and Newell, West Virginia
- Other name: Newell Toll Bridge
- Maintained by: Newell Bridge and Railway Company

Characteristics
- Design: Cable suspension bridge
- Clearance below: 13.5 feet (4.1 m)

History
- Opened: 1905

Statistics
- Daily traffic: Open, usually 2,000 cars per day
- Toll: $1.00 (one-way) for cars and pickups

Location
- Interactive map of Wayne Six Toll Bridge

The Wayne Six Toll Bridge, formerly the Newell Toll Bridge, is a privately owned suspension bridge over the Ohio River on the Golding Street Extension between East Liverpool, Ohio and Newell, West Virginia, United States. It carries two lanes of roadway and a pedestrian path along the west side. Tolls are charged for all road users at varying rates depending on the vehicle. The bridge is one of the last suspension bridges on the Ohio River.

In July 2023, the bridge was renamed in honor of its longtime caretaker, Wayne Six, who at the time had been in charge of the bridge's upkeep for 56 years.

== See also ==
- List of crossings of the Ohio River
