= Robert Taggart Hall =

Robert Taggart Hall (1877 – 1920) was owner and sometime-president of The Hall China Company in East Liverpool, Ohio, US.

== Single-fire at Hall China ==
When Robert Taggart Hall took over the running of Hall China in 1904, he was determined to develop a single-fire range. Together with staff chemists and ceramic engineers, he experimented over seven years. Finally, in 1911, Hall and his staff were successful.

== Lead-free ware by accident ==
Inadvertently, Hall China developed a completely lead-free glaze. This was due not to particular health or environmental considerations, but that lead wouldn't survive the high firing temperatures required of their single-fire process.
