= Fiesta Tableware Company =

Ceramics manufacturer in Newell, West Virginia, US

- Formerly: Laughlin Brothers Pottery (1871–1877); Homer Laughlin (1877–1896); Homer Laughlin China Company (1896–2020)
- Company type: Private
- Industry: Ceramics
- Founded: 1871; 155 years ago
- Founders: Homer Laughlin; Shakespeare Laughlin
- Headquarters: Newell, West Virginia, U.S.
- Area served: Worldwide
- Products: Fiesta
- Website: www.fiestatableware.com

The Fiesta Tableware Company, formerly the Homer Laughlin China Company, is a ceramics manufacturer in Newell, West Virginia, United States. Established in 1871, it is widely known for its Art Deco glazed dinnerware line, Fiesta. In 2002, The New York Times called Fiesta "the most collected brand of china in the United States". A visitor center and factory outlet are maintained at its headquarters.

== History ==
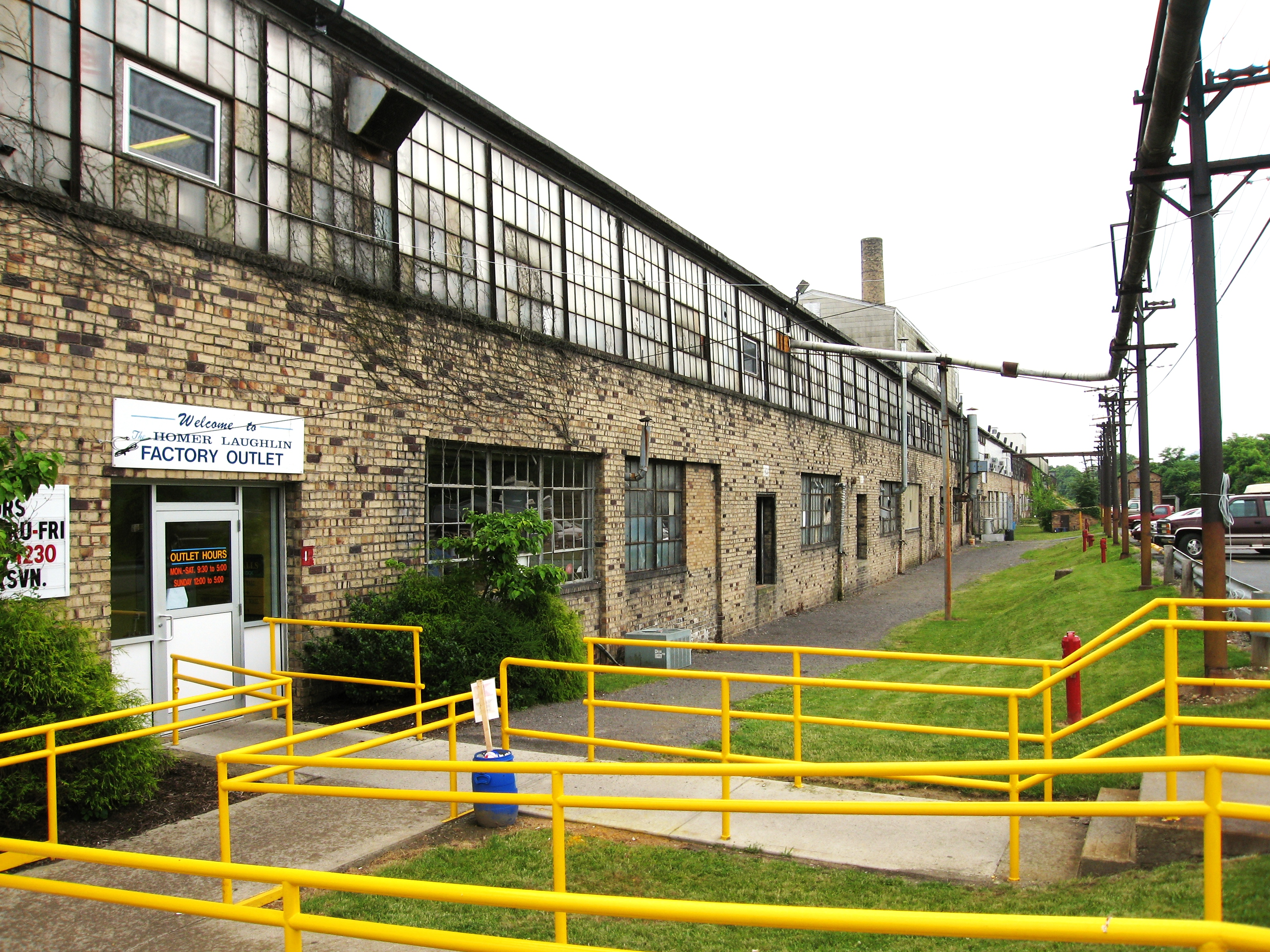
The visitor's entrance at the company's production plant in Newell, West Virginia

The Fiesta Tableware Company originated as Laughlin Brothers Pottery, a two-kiln pottery on the banks of the Ohio River in East Liverpool, Ohio that was established in 1871 by brothers Shakespeare and Homer Laughlin. The company was awarded a prize at the 1876 Centennial Exposition in Philadelphia for the best white ware. Shakespeare left the company in 1879, and the firm was renamed to simply "Homer Laughlin".

William Edwin Wells joined Laughlin in 1889, and seven years later they incorporated as the Homer Laughlin China Company. Laughlin sold his interest to Wells shortly thereafter and moved to California. The firm experienced rapid growth in the early twentieth century, expanding to three factories with 36 kilns in East Liverpool and opening a new 30-kiln plant in nearby Newell, West Virginia in 1903. By 1929, all production was centered at the West Virginia factories.

In 1920, the company hired Albert V. Bleininger, a scientist, author, and educator, who oversaw the conversion of Homer Laughlin China from bottle kilns to more efficient tunnel kilns. In 1927, the company hired English ceramist Frederick Hurten Rhead, who focused on the design of the company's products and experimented with shapes and glazes. In 1935, this work culminated in his designs for the Fiesta line. The company reached its production peak in 1948, manufacturing 10,129,449 items. The original run of Fiesta products was discontinued in 1973, but was revived in 1986.

In 2010, the company acquired The Hall China Company in East Liverpool, including its production facility and product lines. It reorganized as HLC, Inc., with Homer Laughlin and Hall China as subsidiaries and continued manufacturing at both of its United States facilities.

In 2020, HLC, Inc. sold its food service divisions along with the Hall China and Homer Laughlin brands to Steelite International, a British-based international tableware manufacturer. The company rebranded as the Fiesta Tableware Company, retaining its retail division (including the Fiestaware line), manufacturing operations and headquarters in Newell. Homer Laughlin president Elizabeth Wells McIlvain said that the Wells family entered into the sale of the food service division to focus exclusively on Fiesta as its food services division had been unprofitable and was unable to compete with imported tableware.

== Dinnerware lines ==
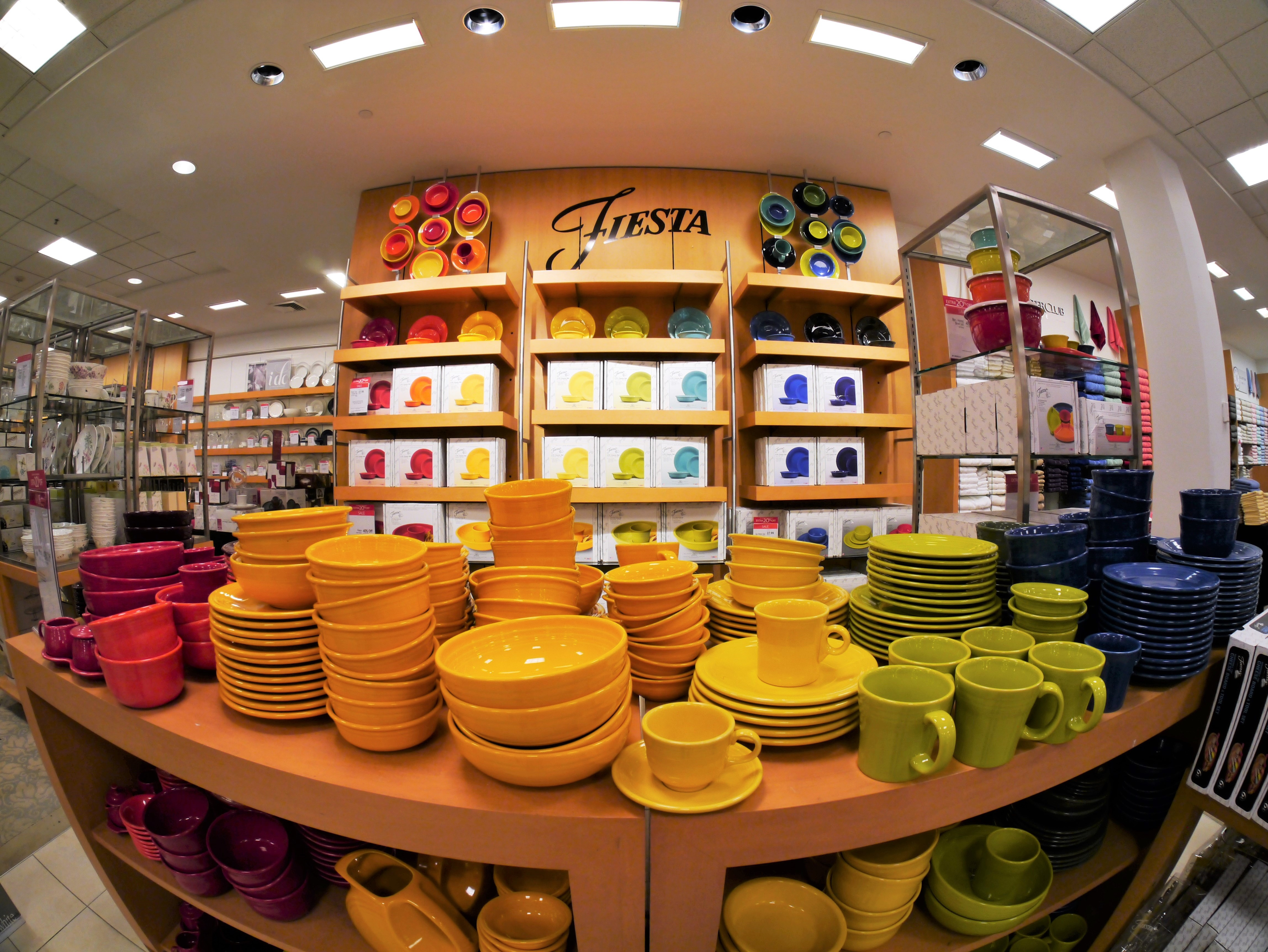
Fiesta products

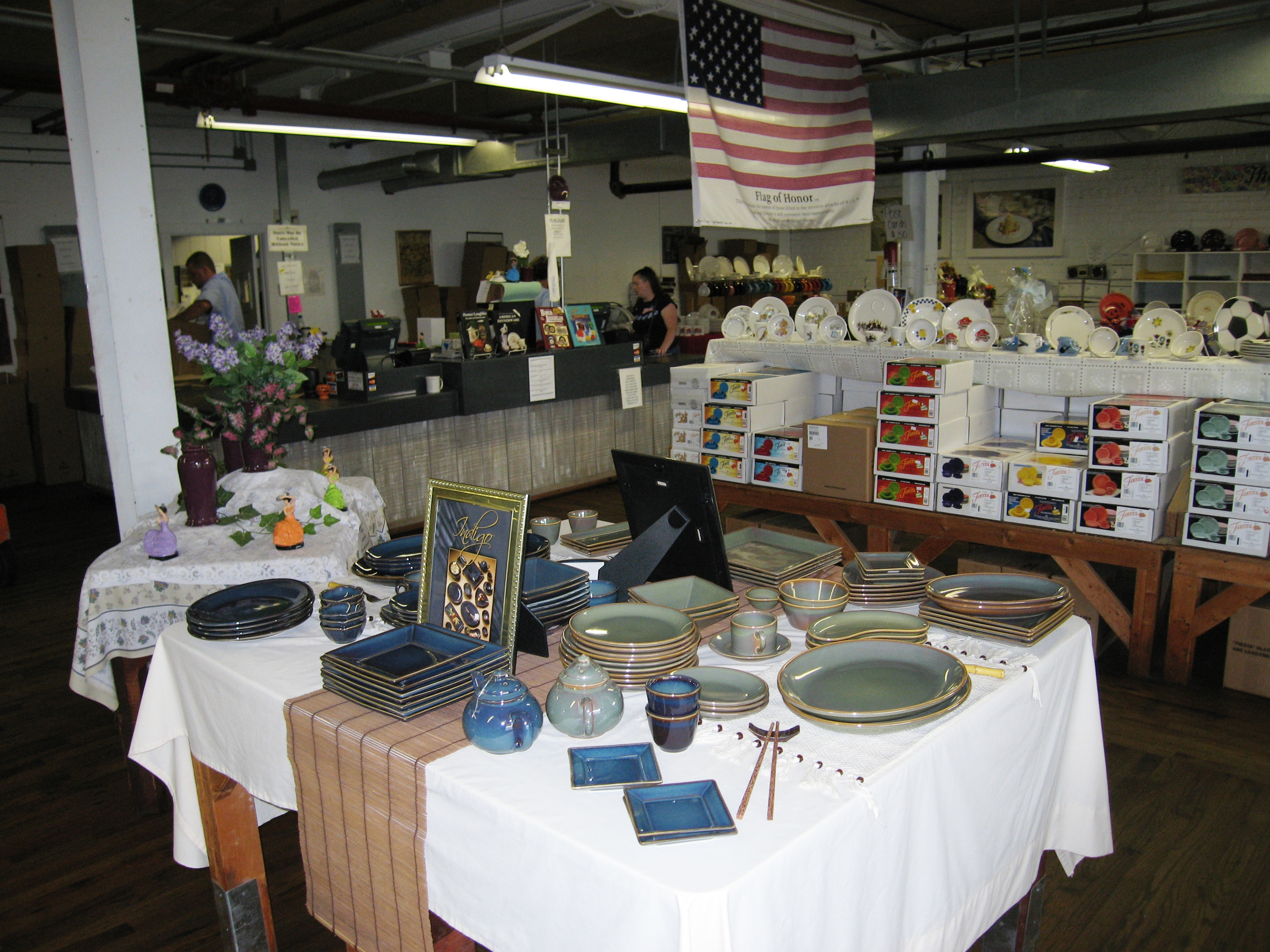
The retailing floor at the company's factory outlet store in 2006

In the 1920s the firm advertised itself as the largest pottery company in the world. Estimates of production range from 25,000 to 35,000 different patterns since production started.

=== Fiesta ===
Homer Laughlin began producing the popular and colorful Fiesta line of dinnerware in 1936. Fiesta dinnerware continued to be produced through the late 1960s, with a number of new colors offered before the entire line was phased out in 1973. Fiesta was re-introduced by the company in 1986 and remains in production. The new Fiesta line contains a number of shapes produced from the original molds, although with the change to a fully vitrified (harder) clay body, some modifications to the molds were required which resulted in slight changes to the shape from the original design. Where no modifications were required, the greater shrinkage of the contemporary clay during firing results in the final object being of slightly smaller size than when directly compared to an example of original vintage production. As well many completely new shapes designed for modern-day use have been created. Like the original line, the current production features an evolving number of glaze colors.

=== Other retail lines ===
In addition to Fiesta, two other lines of colorful dinnerware in bright, solid-colored glazes were introduced in the 1930s. Harlequin was introduced in 1938 as a less expensive alternative to Fiesta and was commissioned by and sold exclusively at Woolworth's stores. The third line of bright solid color ware produced by Homer Laughlin during that era was Riviera dinnerware [1938], which is distinctive for its triple-scalloped corners on a square shape. Riviera was available in red, yellow, light green, mauve blue, ivory [during the war] and occasionally cobalt blue. Production of Riviera ended circa 1948–49. Harlequin was produced until 1964 and was briefly reintroduced in 1979 for the Woolworth company's 100-year anniversary.

Epicure, a line based on popular colors and shapes of the 1950s was introduced in 1955 and was designed by a student of Russel Wright. Wright's own dinnerware lines were made by Homer Laughlin rival, Steubenville Pottery in nearby Steubenville, Ohio. Epicure today is a sought-after collectible, but it was not well received when introduced and was dropped only one year after its debut.

Golden Wheat Line, Homer-Laughlin Company produced the Golden Wheat line between 1949 and 1966. These pieces were added to Duz Detergent boxes as an enticement to buyers. These dishes feature a center picture of wheat bending in the wind, with a trim on the edge in 22k gold.

=== Partnership lines ===
Modern Star, a short dinnerware china set made by the Homer Laughlin China Company in association with the Taylor, Smith and Taylor Pottery Company and Quaker Oats Company. Modern Star is not a shape but a short dinnerware set with an "atomic style" starburst pattern prominent on each piece of the dinnerware. The dinnerware line was produced for the Quaker Oats Company as a way for the company to drive sales of its flagship breakfast product. Back then, companies like Quaker Oats would offer dinnerware and household items by marketing to their customers the ability to collect box tops from their products, which consumers could then send in to Quaker Oats with a reduced price per piece or set of the desired pieces of dinnerware the customer wanted to purchase. Customers could purchase small sets or a complete set of dinnerware for up to 6 people. Modern Star was one of the last dinnerware lines the Homer Laughlin China Company manufactured in partnership with Taylor, Smith & Taylor Pottery Company. The Modern Star Line was discontinued in 1958 and is highly collectible.

=== Government lines ===
HLC maintains contracts with the federal government to supply china and dinnerware for a range of functions. This includes formal dinners to dinnerware for use by US troops at base camps and in the field. A number of these designs are exclusive to the US government.
