= Vitreous china =

Ceramic material used for flush toilets and other plumbing utilities

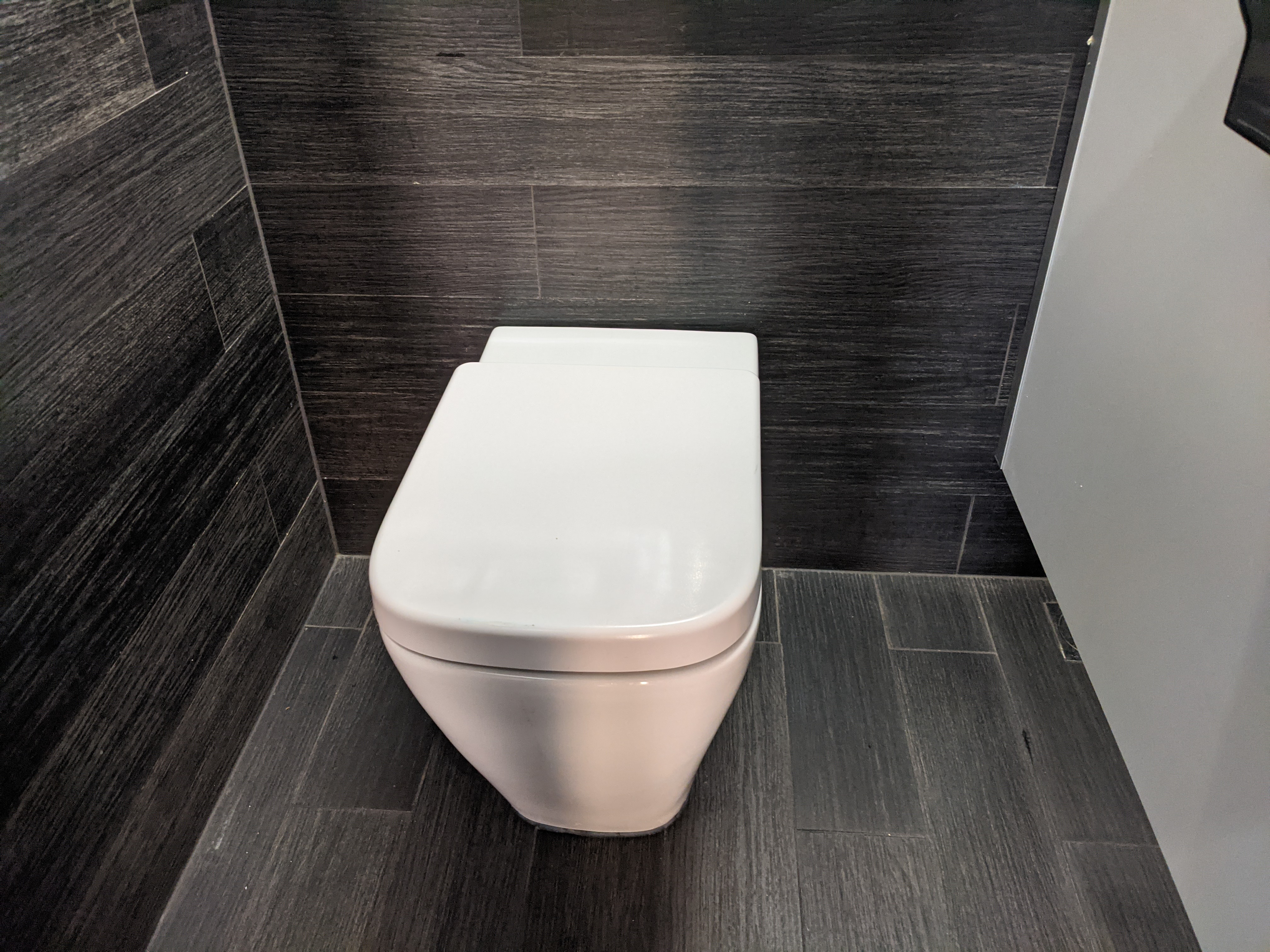
- Toilets are typically made of vitreous china
- Material type: ceramic

Physical properties
- Density (ρ): 1.83-2.48 g/cm^{3}
- Water absorption—over 24 hours: <0.5%

Mechanical properties
- Compressive strength (σ_{c}): 400-800 kgf/cm^{2} (39226.6-78453.2 kPa)
- Poisson's ratio (ν): 0.5

Vitreous china is a dense, nonporous ceramic that is commonly used to make sanitary fixtures like toilets and sinks. It has also been used to make robust crockery and tableware for use in institutions like hospitals, schools, and prisons where sanitation and durability are important. The vitreous china material is typically coated with a porcelain enamel to produce a smooth, durable surface finish.

== Structure ==
Vitreous china is made from clay with a higher than normal amount of feldspar. The latter melts during firing and fills voids in the ceramic, reducing porosity.

After vitrification, vitreous china contains mullite, a crystal which forms as a result of reactions taking place in clay. Not all quartz and feldspar liquify during firing, so some remain as "relict" in the final vitrified product.

== Physical properties ==
The low porosity of vitreous china means its water absorption is less than 0.5%. The porosity of vitreous china can be reduced by increasing its feldspar content.

While vitreous china is in its liquid phase during firing its viscosity depends on its constitutive ratio of glass to other particles—a higher quantity of particles results in higher viscosity. Vitreous china's density post vitrification ranges from 1.83 to 2.48 grams per cubic centimetre. Its Poisson ratio is 0.5. Its flexural strength is 400–800 kgf/cm^{2}.

== Production ==
In most cases, vitreous china consists of a mix of clay, feldspar, flint and quartz sand. This mix is usually fired once at 1200–1300 °C for most applications, and twice fired for use in crockery with a first firing at 900–950 °C and a second firing at 1200–1250 °C. Crockery is fired twice to reduce its porosity. To make the mix more workable, water is usually added. The firing temperature chosen is important, as vitreous and ceramic bodies are less strong and more porous if under or over fired.

Creep is the unwanted distortion a vitreous body undergoes during firing and is influenced by the substance's rheological properties. Such properties depend on the particles in vitreous china's glass mixture, which can vary in type, size (1–50 μm), distribution or shape. The amount of mullite in vitreous china, which is determined by the amount of clay in the starting mixture, is the primary determinant for creep rate during firing.
