= Newell, West Virginia =

- Census-designated place
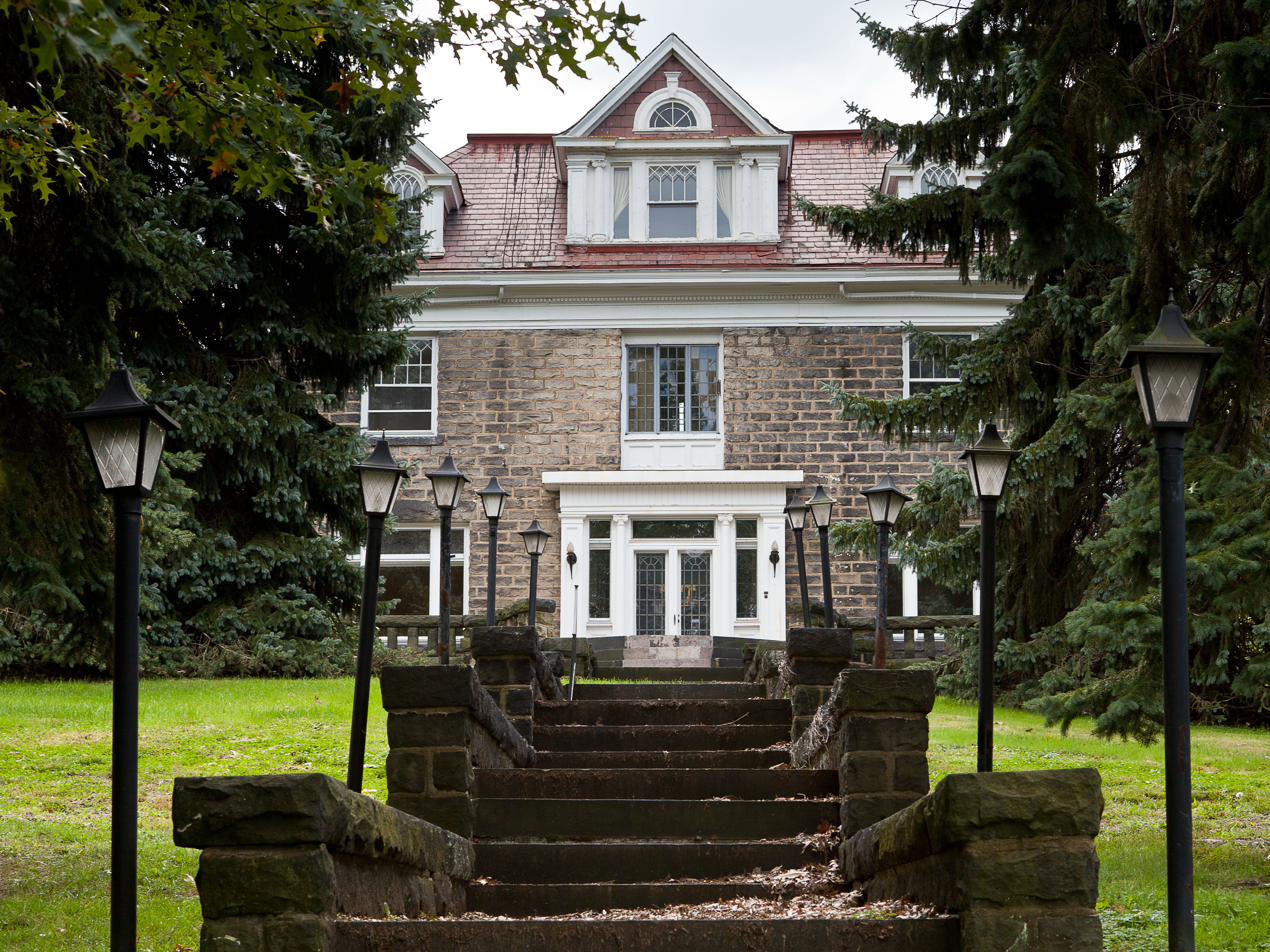
- William E. Wells House
- Motto: Home of Fiestaware
- Location of Newell, West Virginia Newell (the United States)
- Coordinates: 40°37′3″N 80°36′3″W
- Country: United States
- State: West Virginia
- County: Hancock

Area
  - Total: 0.93 sq mi (2.4 km^{2})
  - Land: 0.73 sq mi (1.9 km^{2})
  - Water: 0.19 sq mi (0.5 km^{2})
- Elevation: 750 ft (230 m)

Population (2020)
  - Total: 1,203
  - Density: 1,600/sq mi (630/km^{2})
- Time zone: UTC-5 (Eastern (EST))
  - Summer (DST): UTC-4 (EDT)
- ZIP code: 26050
- Area code: 304
- FIPS code: 54-58420
- GNIS feature ID: 1558378

Newell is an unincorporated community and census-designated place in Hancock County, West Virginia, United States, along the Ohio River. The population was 1,203 at the 2020 census. It is part of the Weirton–Steubenville metropolitan area and is best known as home to the Fiesta Tableware Company.

== History ==
Hamilton, a small town across the Ohio River from Wellsville, Ohio, was laid out by William Hamilton south of the current site of Newell. Hugh Newell, the son of a pioneer from nearby New Manchester (then called Pughtown) became the owner of the site in the 1800s.

In 1891, an entrepreneurial group from Pittsburgh bought out the farms of John Newell and J. Bentley Newell, descendants of Hugh, as well as William McDonald, the Wells family, and the Moore family, with the intentions of surverying the primarily flat banks for the development of a large industrial complex. The town of Newell was laid out by the North American Manufacturing Company in 1902 after they bought the tract from U.S. Steel, who sat on the land in fear of establishing a steel mill after the Panic of 1893.

In 1905, the Homer Laughlin China Company, located across the Ohio River in East Liverpool, Ohio, established what would be the largest pottery factory in the world at the time at a site in Newell, and the Wayne Six Toll Bridge was constructed across the river to connect the towns. Throughout the rest of the decade, the town would grow quickly. A school was established in 1907. Other manufacturers, including potteries, tile producers, and refractories were established in the 1910s and 1920s.

Waterford Park and the William E. Wells House are listed on the National Register of Historic Places.

== Geography ==
Newell is located at 40°37′3″N 80°36′3″W (40.617544, -80.600856). The city of New Cumberland is located towards the south, the city of Chester is located eastward, and the city of East Liverpool, Ohio is north via the Wayne Six Toll Bridge.

According to the United States Census Bureau, the CDP has a total area of 0.9 square miles (2.4 km^{2}), of which 0.8 square mile (1.9 km^{2}) is land and 0.2 square mile (0.5 km^{2}) (21.28%) is water.

== Demographics ==
Historical population
Census	Pop.	Note	%±
1980	2,032		—
1990	1,724		−15.2%
2000	1,602		−7.1%
2010	1,376		−14.1%
2020	1,203		−12.6%
U.S. Decennial Census

As of the census of 2000, there were 1,602 people, 645 households, and 437 families residing in the CDP. The population density was 2,142.0 people per square mile (824.7/km^{2}). There were 709 housing units at an average density of 948.0 per square mile (365.0/km^{2}). The racial makeup of the CDP was 98.63% White, 0.19% African American, 0.06% Native American, 0.12% from other races, and 1.00% from two or more races. Hispanic or Latino of any race were 0.25% of the population.

There were 645 households, out of which 29.0% had children under the age of 18 living with them, 46.7% were married couples living together, 14.7% had a female householder with no husband present, and 32.1% were non-families. 26.5% of all households were made up of individuals, and 10.9% had someone living alone who was 65 years of age or older. The average household size was 2.48 and the average family size was 2.95.

In the CDP the population was spread out, with 24.5% under the age of 18, 10.8% from 18 to 24, 25.8% from 25 to 44, 23.8% from 45 to 64, and 15.1% who were 65 years of age or older. The median age was 37 years. For every 100 females, there were 93.9 males. For every 100 females age 18 and over, there were 89.7 males.

The median income for a household in the CDP was $31,343, and the median income for a family was $35,069. Males had a median income of $29,145 versus $18,086 for females. The per capita income for the CDP was $12,426. About 11.8% of families and 13.7% of the population were below the poverty line, including 21.5% of those under age 18 and 7.3% of those age 65 or over.

== Education ==
Children in Newell are served by the Hancock County Schools. The current schools serving Newell are:

- Allen T. Allison Elementary School – grades K–4
- Oak Glen Middle School – grades 5–8
- Oak Glen High School – grades 9–12

== Transportation ==
The Wayne Six Toll Bridge, formerly Newell Bridge, was built in 1905 and connects West Virginia Route 2 in Newell to East Liverpool, Ohio. It is the only privately owned toll bridge on the Ohio River.

== See also ==
- List of cities and towns along the Ohio River
- Homer Laughlin China Company
