= Chinaman (porcelain) =

Dealer in porcelain and chinaware, especially in 18th-century London

This business card from about 1764 reads, "William Hussey, China and Glass Man, In Coventry Street, Piccadilly, London. Sells all Sorts of China, Glass and Stone Ware; Likewise Japan Dressing Boxes for Ladies Toilets with Variety of India Fans &c. &c. Wholesale and Retail. N.B. The above Goods for Exportation." It is embellished with Chinese motifs such as a figure with a pigtail.

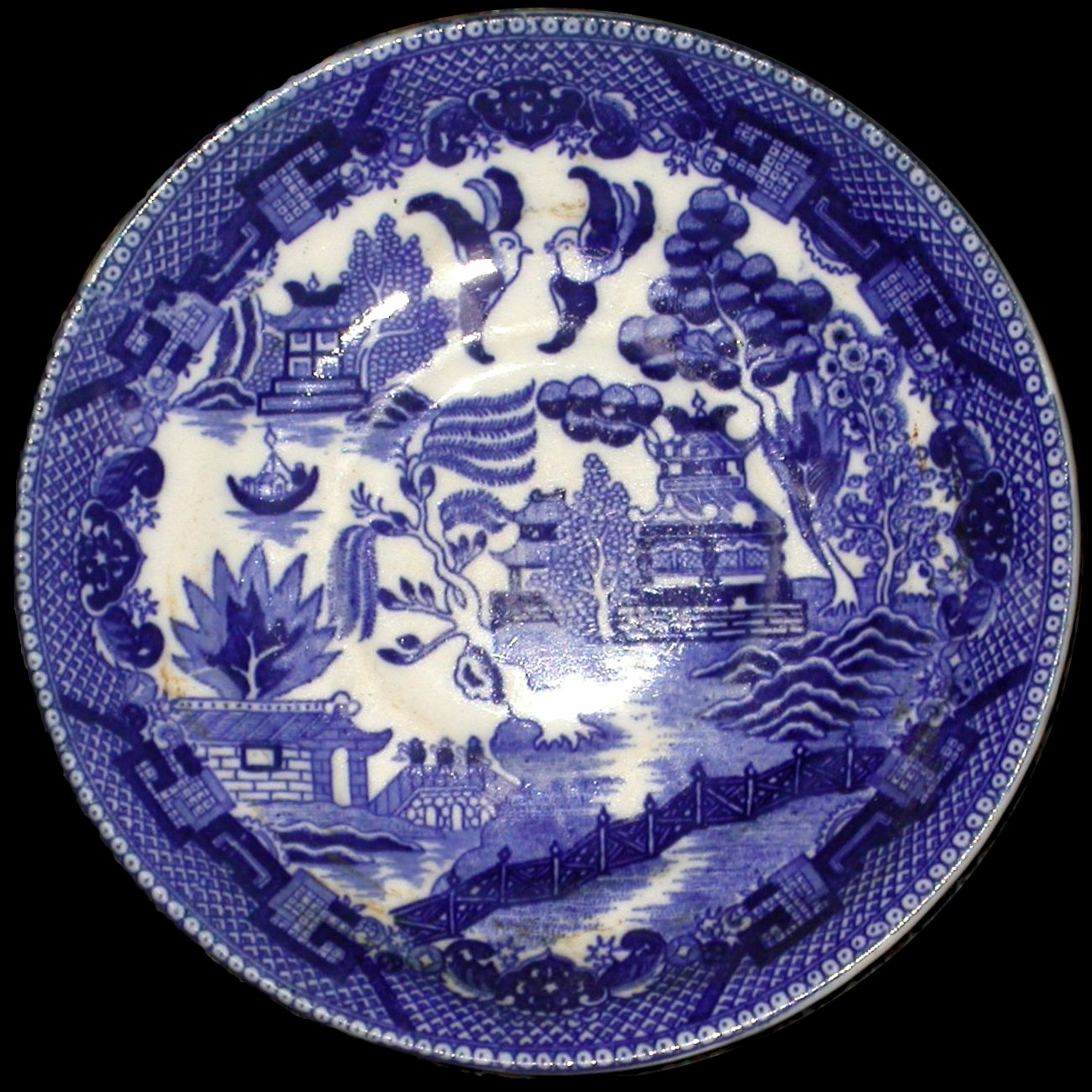
Blue and white porcelain in a Chinese style. The willow pattern was actually invented in England and this piece was produced in Staffordshire.

William BELOE, China-Man,
Market-Place, Norwich

Has just received from the India Company's Sale a large and regular Assortment of useful and ornamental China, Japanned Tea Boards, Waiters, Toilet and Card Boxes, the best India Soy, Fish and Counters, Fans, etc, etc. which will be sold at the present London Prices. He has also a large Parcel of useful China from Commodore JOHNSTONE's Prize Goods taken from the Dutch, which will be sold cheap.

He is lately returned from Staffordshire with a very large and elegant Assortment of that much improved Manufactory, particularly some compleat Table Services, after the Dresden Manner and from their Patterns; and in consequence of his frequent Attendance on that Manufactory, he will be able to supply his Warehouse in Norwich immediately with every new and improved Pattern.

The above Goods, with all Sorts of Glass, Stone, Delft, and Earthen Ware, will be sold Wholesale and Retail upon very low Terms.

N.B. All Wholesale Dealers will meet with very great Encouragement for ready Money.

— Norfolk Chronicle (July 12th 1783) in the British Library

A chinaman is a dealer in porcelain and chinaware, especially in 18th-century London, where this was a recognised trade; a "toyman" dealt additionally in fashionable trifles, such as snuffboxes. Chinamen bought large quantities of Chinese export porcelain and Japanese export porcelain landed by the East India Company, who held auctions twice a year in London. The traders then distributed chinaware throughout England.

Imports from China declined at the end of the 18th century. Domestic production by the English potteries became large and the manufacturers, such as Mason and Wedgwood, became successful and supplied their own retail businesses.

== Chinaware ==
Chinese porcelain was imported into England from the 1680s. London was the main port where between one and two million pieces were landed each year. These were sold at auction by the East India Company and the resulting trade made London the hub for distribution of chinaware throughout the country. London remained the centre of the trade even after large scale production started in the English provinces, especially the Staffordshire Potteries. This was because of the continuing import/export business and the concentration of artistic talent and the cream of society there.

== Trade ==
The occupation of chinaman was documented by A General Description of All Trades in 1747: "This business is altogether shopkeeping, and some of them carry on a very considerable Trade..." The cost of becoming an apprentice was usually £20 to £50 but could be as much as £200. A journeyman was given wages of £20 to £30 a year plus board. The value of the stock in trade would typically be £500 but a prosperous merchant might have stock valued at £2,000 or more.

One prominent chinaman of this well-to-do sort was James Giles who had premises in Soho and a fashionable showroom near Charing Cross. In the 1760s, Josiah Wedgwood was the first of the English potters to open his own showroom in West End of London rather than making bulk sales to the trade (as well as commissions for large services); eventually others followed. The retail side of Wedgwood's operation was run by his partner — the cultivated merchant, Thomas Bentley. Bentley opened a showroom on the corner of St Martin's Lane, then moved to Greek Street in Soho and opened further showrooms in other fashionable places such as Bath.

== Competition ==
In 1785, they formed a trade association called the China Club. Collusion developed at the biannual auctions of the East India Company from about 1779. This auction ring depressed the prices obtained at auction and so the trade became unprofitable. The import duty on tea was reduced from 119% to 12.5% in 1784. This increased the demand for tea and so it became the preferred cargo. In 1791, the Court of Directors ordered that, henceforth, china was only to be carried as ballast on their vessels. This reduced the import trade considerably and so, in 1795, the chinaman Miles Mason of Fenchurch Street, asked whether the company would carry private shipments of china for a carriage fee. They declined and Mason went on to develop a business in Liverpool and then Staffordshire.

Mason wanted to develop a method of making replacement pieces for existing sets of china. His experiments led to the development of a type of pottery which, like Chinese porcelain, was strong and so resisted chipping. This was ironstone china which developed into a substantial business under his son, Charles, who patented the process. Many other potteries in England copied this style and large quantities were exported to other countries such as France and the United States. The original trade in imports from China ceased in 1798 as the East India Company stopped making bulk sales.

== See also ==
- Worshipful Company of Glass Sellers
