= Restaurant ware =

Tableware

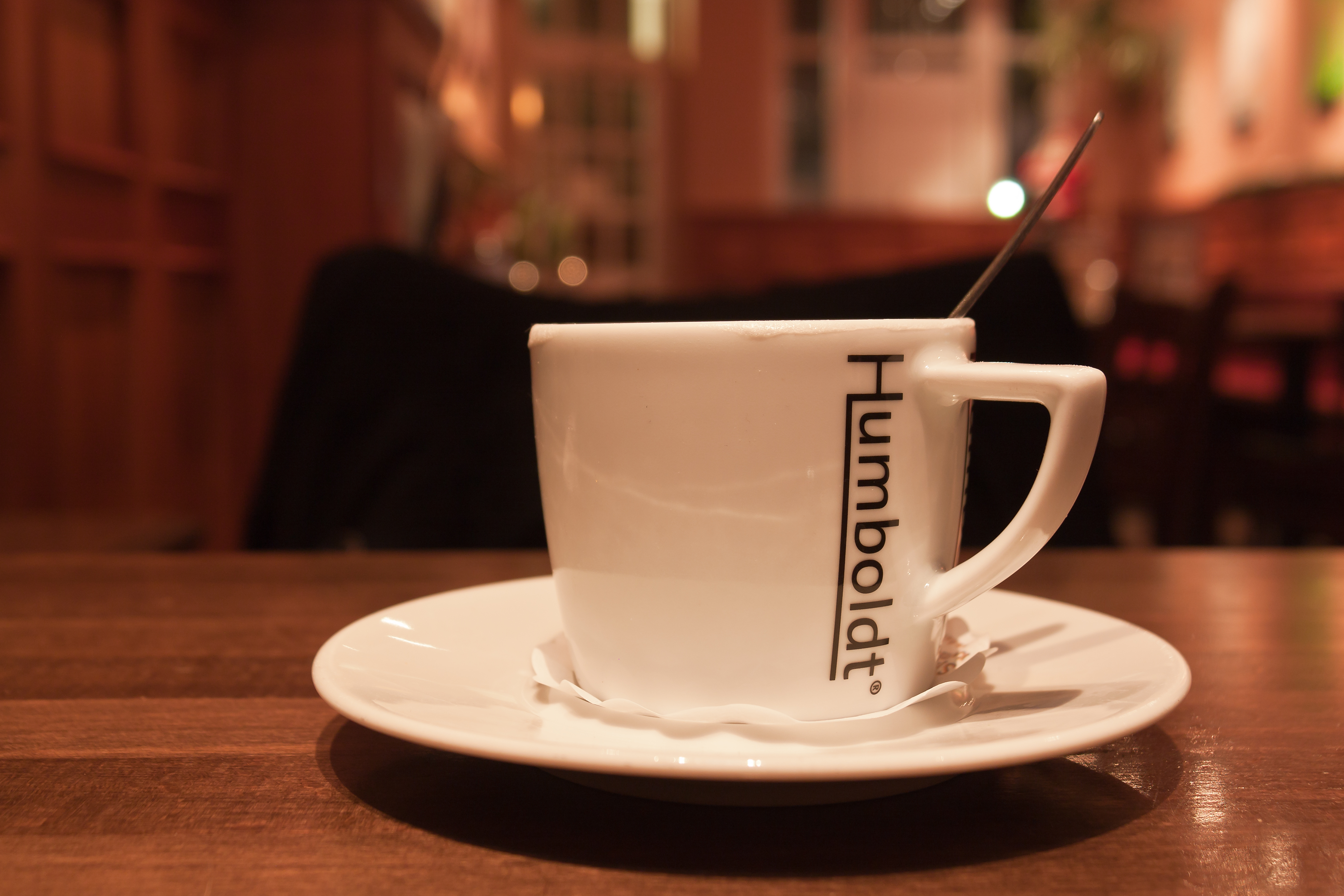
Hotelware coffee mug for the Humboldt restaurant in Rostock, Germany.

Restaurant ware, or most commonly hotelware, is vitrified, ceramic tableware which exhibits high mechanical strength and is produced for use in hotels and restaurants. Tableware used in railway dining cars, passenger ships and airlines are also included in this category.

Collectable hotelware was usually made of stoneware or ironstone china during the early to mid-20th century. Examples from the 19th century are also collectable, but rarer.

== History ==
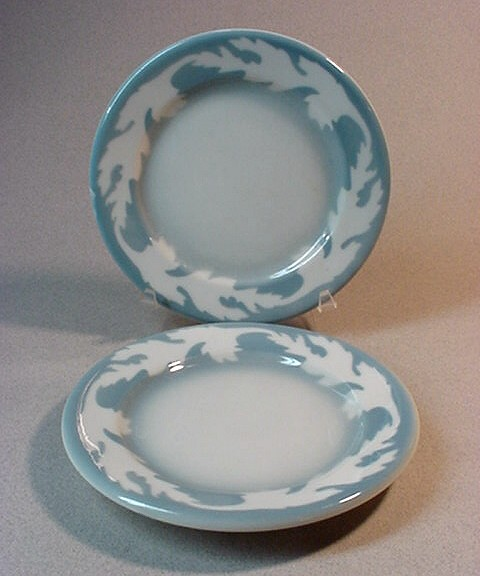
The "Oakleigh" airbrushed stencil design on side plates by Syracuse China.

Hotelware was produced by the same potteries that produced domestic ware. As the middle class grew during the late 19th century, dining out became an affordable option for more people with disposable income. The number of restaurants, and mass transportation such as ships and railways with dining facilities, led to a greater demand for hotelware. Stoneware and ironstone ware were popular choices for restaurants for their ability to withstand heavy use. Transfer designs also enabled some restaurants to set their tables with pieces bearing the business name or emblem. By the early 20th century, hotelware expanded into diners catering to road travellers, and airlines also introduced on board meals served on hotelware.

=== United States ===
Homer Laughlin, the largest pottery in the United States for much of the 20th century, first began producing hotelware in 1959, but by 1970, it ended its production of household porcelain. Homer Laughlin produced hotelware exclusively until the revival of interest in Fiesta Ware led to its reintroduction to its product lines. Although not ceramic and not generally considered hotelware, from 1950 to 1956 Anchor Hocking produced Fire King Jadeite ware that was aimed at catering establishments .

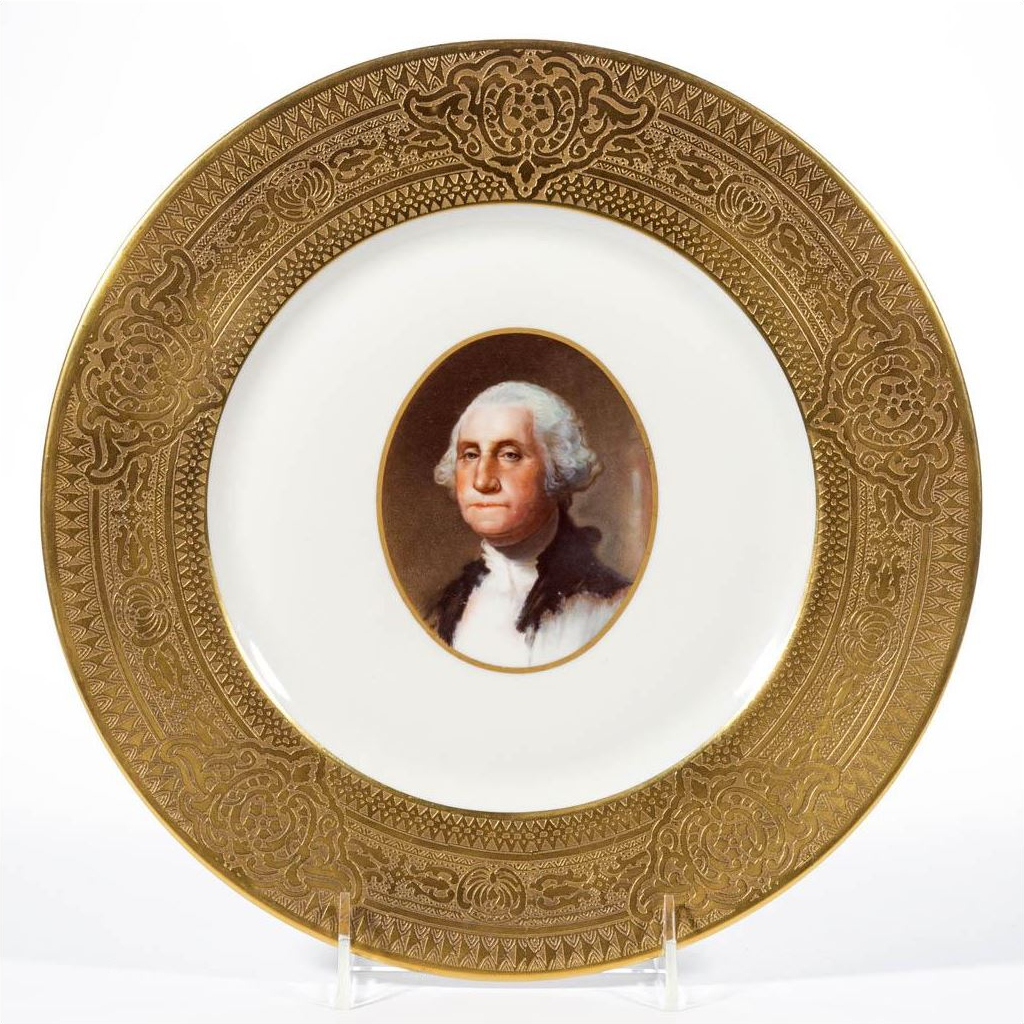
Buffalo Pottery plate made for Chesapeake & Ohio Railway c.1932

Buffalo Pottery was founded in Buffalo, New York in 1901. For most of the 20th century, Buffalo Pottery manufactured custom institutional, restaurant, railroad, steamship, and hotel ware. The company produced ware for such entities as the Chesapeake & Ohio Railway (George Washington and Chessie Cat services), the Greenbrier, the Ahwahnee Hotel at Yosemite, the Roycroft Inn, the 1939 New York World's Fair, and the U.S. Navy. Changing its name to Buffalo China, Inc. in 1956, the company was one of the largest manufacturers of commercial chinaware in the United States. Buffalo China was sold to Oneida Limited in 1983, and went out of operation in 2004.

The hotelware industry in the United States faced many challenges beginning in the late 1980s. Following the economic downturn of 1987 and the 1990s, restaurants were hit hard by a decline in consumer spending and demand for hotelware declined by 20%. At the same time, Americans consumed fast-food in disposable containers at an increasing rate, putting more pressure on the US hotelware industry. By the early 21st century, Syracuse China, which had for decades been a major producer of hotelware, ended manufacture in the US and outsourced production overseas.

== Production ==
Since hotelware is subject to heavy use, it is made to resist chipping and cracking rather than emphasizing aesthetic qualities over utility. Whereas bone china is fired at near its melting point when it is produced, hotelware is not.

== Manufacturers ==
Lithograph on a plate produced by Iroquois China Company from 1930s or 1940s

- Colombia - Corona
- Czech Republic - Pirken-Hammer
- Germany - Eschenbach, Hutschenreuther, Villeroy & Boch
- Indonesia - Royal Doulton
- Japan - Noritake
- Luxembourg - Villeroy & Boch
- Sri Lanka - Noritake
- United Arab Emirates - RAK Porcelain
- United Kingdom - Dudson, Royal DoultonSteelite & Wedgwood.
- United States - Syracuse China, Buffalo China, Iroquois China Company, Homer Laughlin & Anchor Hocking.

== Related collectables ==
Vintage fast food ware, such as "beehive" glass condiment containers, is also collectable, and several United States manufacturers and vintage dealers also market reproductions of vintage styles.

== See also ==
- Retro style
- Ironstone china
