= George Hemming Mason =

English painter (1818–1872)

George Hemming Mason ARA
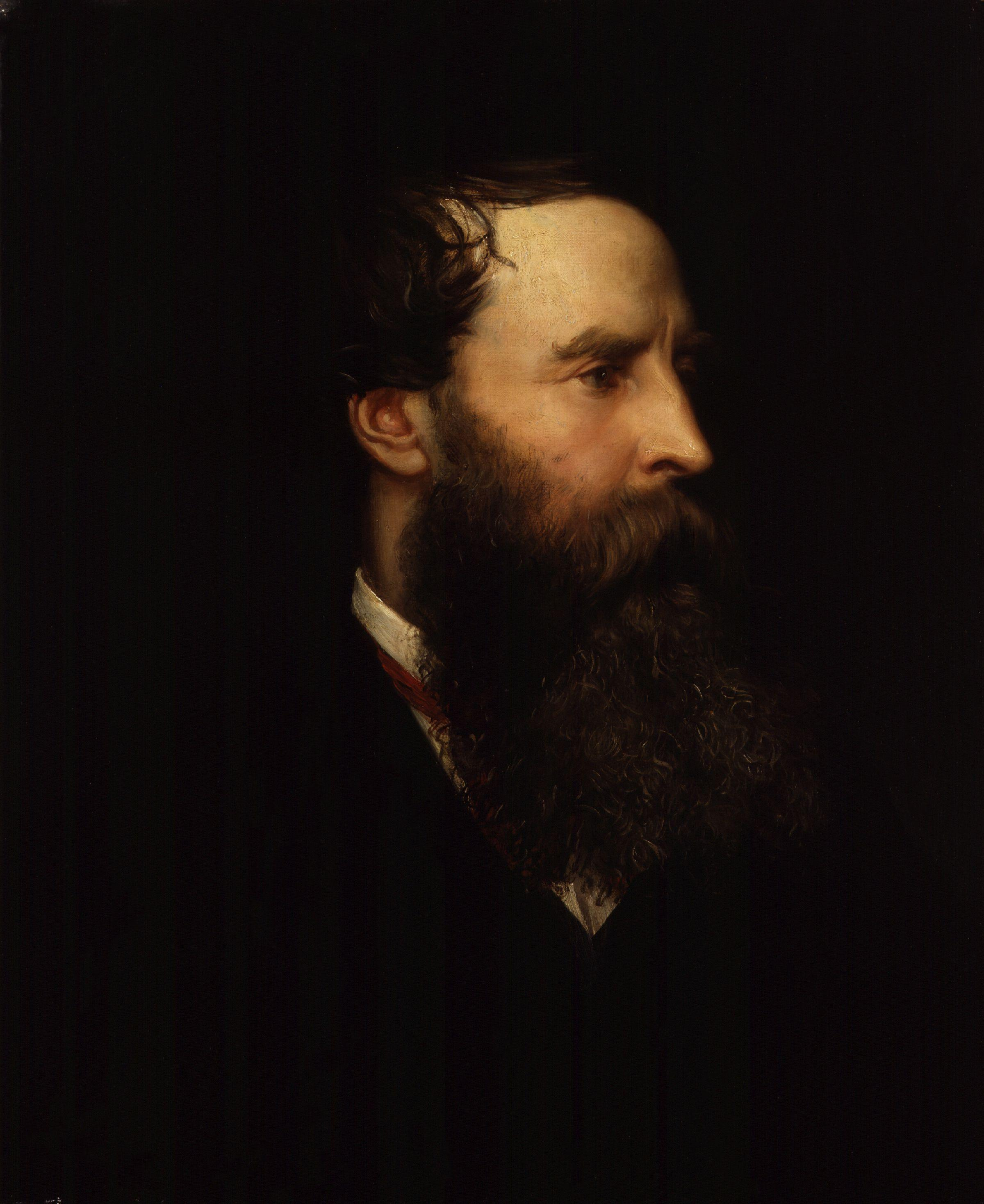
- Portrait by Prinsep
- Born: 11 March 1818; Stoke-on-Trent, England
- Died: 22 October 1872 (aged 54); London, England
- Relatives: Miles Mason (grandfather)

George Heming Mason ARA (11 March 1818 – 22 October 1872) was a British landscape painter of rural scenes, initially in Italy, then England itself. He was also known as "George Mason" or "George Hemming Mason".

== Life ==
=== Early years ===
Mason was born at Fenton Park in the parish of Stoke-upon-Trent, Staffordshire, the eldest son of George Miles Mason (1789–1859) and Eliza Heming (daughter of Major Heming of Mapleton, Derbyshire). His grandfather, Miles Mason, was a potter, and the pottery was afterwards carried on by his father and uncle (Charles James Mason) who invented Mason's iron-stone china. His father, who graduated from Brasenose College, Oxford, was a cultivated man, who retiring from his business in 1829, became a country gentleman, devoting himself to literature and painting. In 1832 the family moved to Wetley Abbey, a mansion situated in the midst of a park, near Wetley Rocks in Staffordshire, five miles from the Potteries.

Mason was educated at King Edward's School, Birmingham, and from 1834 trained to be a doctor under William Royden Watts, a surgeon, of Birmingham, but abandoned medicine in 1844 in order to pursue a career as an artist. As a youth he was passionately fond of literature and athletics, and he inherited his father's taste for painting. An early oil sketch of his exists entitled "Dummy's Turn to Play" in which he tried to embody a ghastly incident of the time of the plague. He was also art critic to a local newspaper.

=== Life in Italy ===
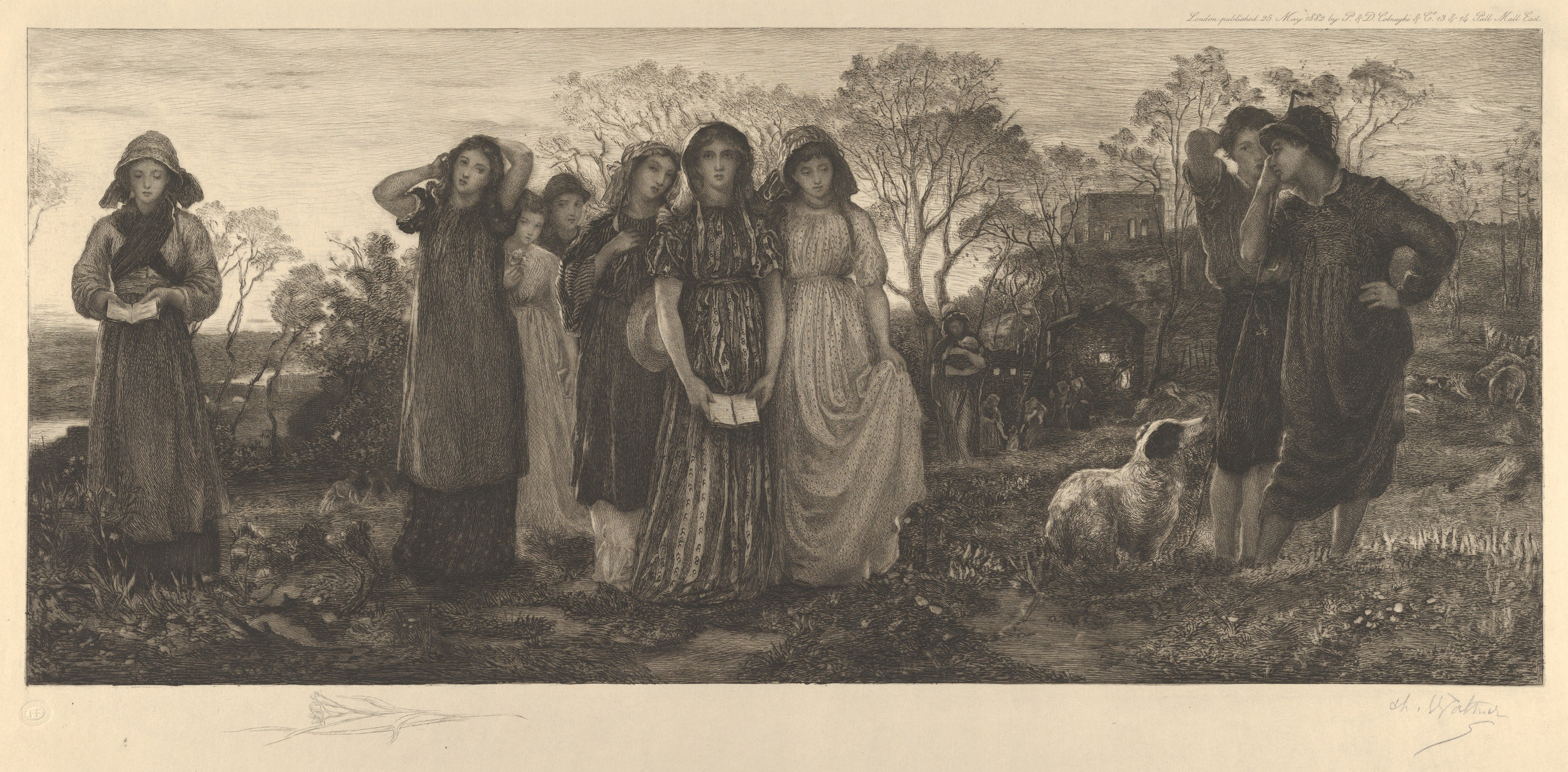
"The Evening Hymn"

In the autumn of 1843, Mason left England with his brother Miles on a trip through France, Switzerland, and Italy - the journey was mainly done on foot. They reached Rome in the autumn of 1845, and George took a studio there. Financial difficulties at home soon compelled him and his brother to fend for themselves, and he made a living painting portraits of the English in Rome, and more particularly of their horses and dogs, for which he had a natural talent.

Despite a serious illness and severe poverty, Mason's spirits never sank, and when the Italian war broke out in 1848, he helped to tend the wounded. His brother Miles entered Garibaldi's army as a volunteer, and eventually became a captain. During the 1849 Siege of Rome, Mason and two fellow-artists, George Thomas (1824–1868), an accomplished illustrator who worked for the Illustrated London News, and Murray (sic), were arrested as suspected spies, and narrowly escaped death.

In 1851, Mason made a tour of the Sabine and Ciociara regions and subsequently spent much time painting cattle as the guest of a gentleman grazier of the Campagna. Mason delighted in the Campagna, and produced a number of pictures there including "Ploughing in the Campagna", "In the Salt Marshes" (1856), and "A Fountain with Figures". When thinking out a composition, which often originated in some literary subject, he usually strolled the neighbouring country in search of particular forms and colours for the accessories. Sometimes a new subject would be thus suggested, as in the case of his "Ploughing in the Campagna" for which he deserted another work already begun.

Mason had many associates amongst the painters and architects who visited Rome, and when Frederic Leighton made the city his winter headquarters, he and Mason became firm friends. Giovanni Costa was for many years Mason's constant companion in Italy. Costa, who in the early days of their intimacy thought Mason's execution childish, recognised from the first the beauty of the sentiment which characterised all his work. They adopted together a system, which they christened "the Etruscan", of preparing their pictures in monochrome before laying on their final colours.

Mason visited the Paris exhibition in 1855, and although he greatly admired the work of Decamps and Hébert, his confidence that he could excel most contemporary painters was confirmed. In 1857 he is said to have made an income of 600 guineas.

=== Return to England ===
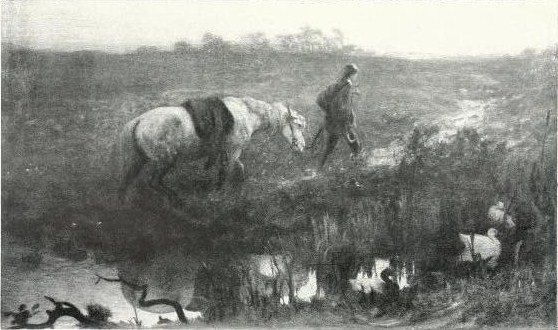
The Cast Shoe (B/W reproduction)

In 1858, Mason returned to England and married Mary Emma Wood (daughter of Edward Gittens Wood of Bayston House, Shropshire) on 5 August. They settled back at the old family mansion Wetley Abbey, and went on to have two sons and five daughters.

The exchange of the blue skies of Italy for the grey and misty atmosphere of England at first depressed Mason. His friend Sir Frederick Leighton stimulated him, however, to exertion, and Mason's produced his first painting in England - "Wind on the Wold". Thenceforward he found inspiration in the exquisite though subdued colours of the Staffordshire country, and there followed from his brush a series of idylls which stamp him as the greatest of the idyllic painters of England.

In 1863 Costa visited him at Wetley while Mason was painting "The End of the Day" and "Wetley Rocks". Afterwards they visited Paris together, and in 1864 Mason shifted his quarters to Westbourne House, Shaftesbury Road, Hammersmith (London), so as to enjoy the society of his fellow artists, but he still passed much of his time at Wetley. At Shaftesbury Road he painted "The Gander", "The Geese", "The Cast Shoe", "Yarrow", "The Young Anglers", "The Unwilling Playmate" and "The Evening Hymn".

A fastidiousness, which increased with his years, was always characteristic of him. He altered the composition of "The Evening Hymn" after it was finished, and the exhibition of it was thus delayed for a year. "The Blackberry Gatherers" was twice repainted - first it was winter, with a hag gathering enchanted herbs, and a fiery-eyed raven on a bare branch overhead, and then he painted it as summer, before completing it as it now stands. A little landscape in Staffordshire was begun as an effect of early spring, then altered to summer, and eventually finished as a late autumn effect, when only the last few leaves were clinging to the trees.

=== Final years ===
In 1869 Mason was elected an Associate of the Royal Academy (ARA) and moved to 7 Theresa Terrace, Hammersmith, where he painted "Only a Shower", "Girls Dancing", "Blackberry Gathering", "The Milk Maid", and "The Harvest Moon". During his last years his health grew feeble, and visits to Lord Leconfield at Petworth House, or to a country house placed at his disposal by the Duke of Westminster, failed to restore it.

Mason died, at his home, of a heart attack on 22 October 1872, aged 54, just after completing his largest, and in some respects his finest, picture, "The Harvest Moon". He was buried on 28 October at Brompton cemetery, London.

== Works ==
- Mason's three largest English compositions were: "The Evening Hymn", "Girls Dancing" and "The Harvest Moon". In the latter, the scythes cutting against the sky form a magnificent composition, but it is doubtful if any exceed in poetic sentiment "Yarrow", "The Cast Shoe", "Home from Milking", "The Young Anglers" and "A Landscape, Derbyshire".
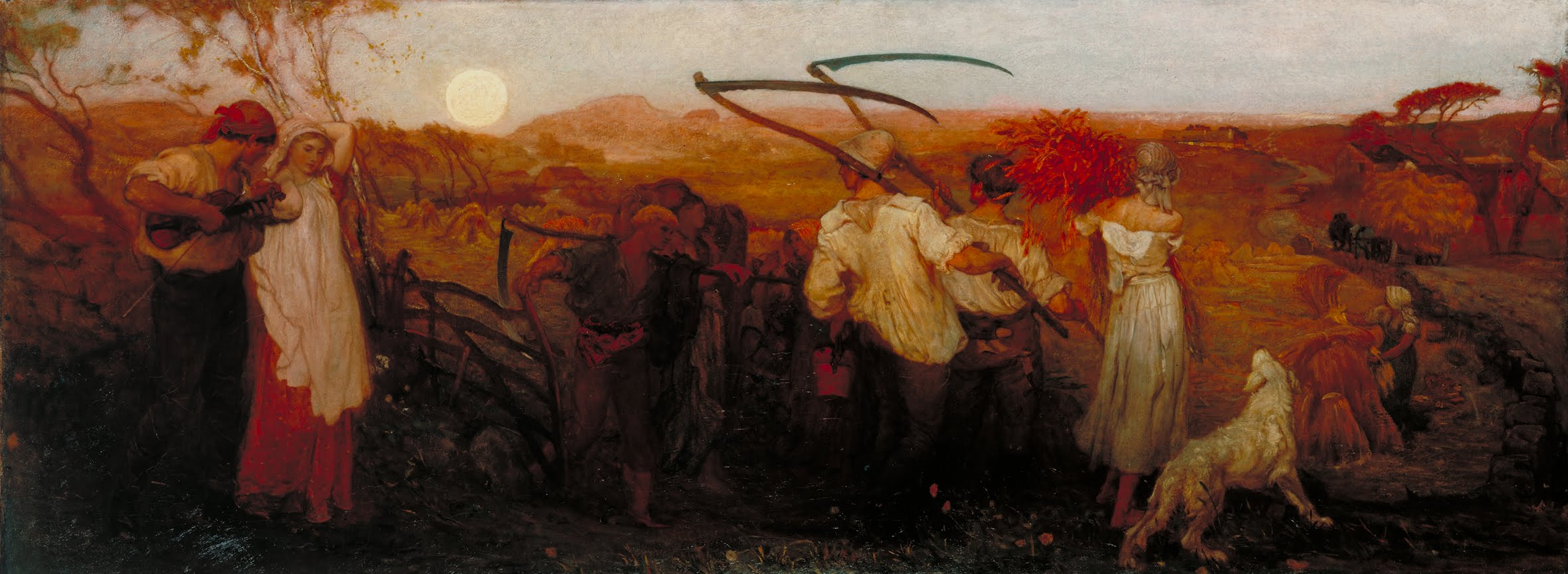
The Harvest Moon, 1872.

The following pictures were exhibited at the Royal Academy:

- "Ploughing in the Campagna" (1857)
- "In the Salt Marshes" and "Campagna di Roma" (1859)
- "Landscape (1861)
- "Mist on the Moors" (1862)
- "Catch" (1863)
- "Returning from Ploughing" (1864)
- "The Gander", "The Geese" and "The Cast Shoe" (1865; Tate, London)
- "Yarrow", "Landscape, North Staffordshire" and "The Young Anglers" (1866)
- "Evening, Matlock", and "The Unwilling Playmate" (1867)
- "The Evening Hymn" and "Netley [a misprint for 'Wetley'] Moor" (1868)
- "Only a Shower", "Three Studies from Nature" and "Girls Dancing" (1869)
- "Landscape, Derbyshire" (1870)
- "Blackberry Gathering" and "The Milk Maid" (1871)
- "The Harvest Moon (1872)
- At the Dudley Gallery was exhibited: "Sketch from Nature, Angmering, Sussex", "The Clothes Line" and "Landscape, Staffordshire, near Southport".
- "Crossing the Moor" was in an exhibition held at the Cosmopolitan Club.
- In 1873 an exhibition of his works was held at the Burlington Fine Arts Club - featuring many of his most charming pictures and compositions which had not been exhibited before: "The Return from Milking", "Wetley Rocks", "Wind in the Wolds", "Ploughing in the Campagna", "La Trita", "Love" and "Home from Work".
- Some of Mason's work was translated into prints by various artists including Harvest Moon by R W Macbeth.
