= Ironstone china =

Vitreous pottery

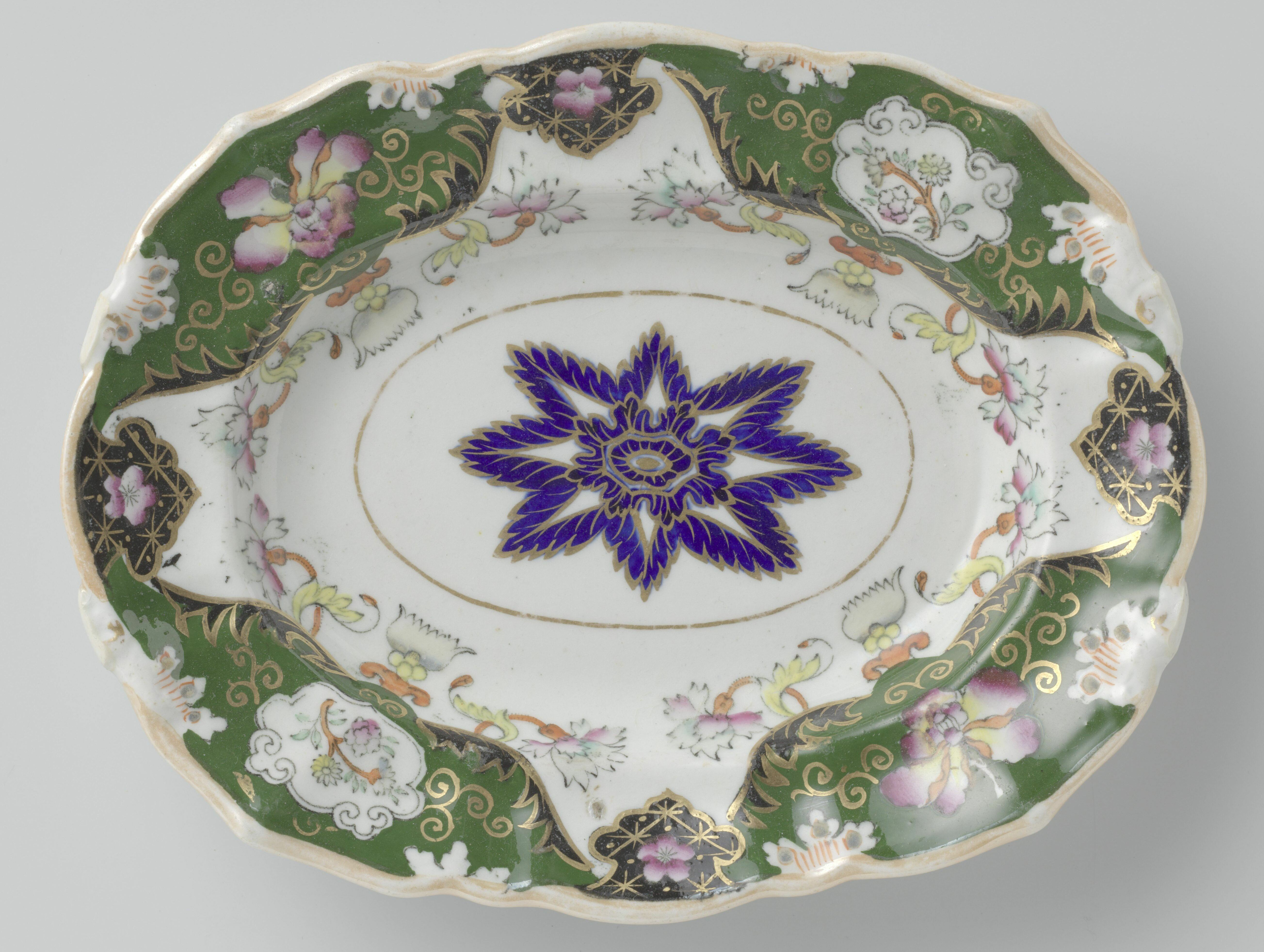
A Mason's ironstone plate, 1840 - 1860

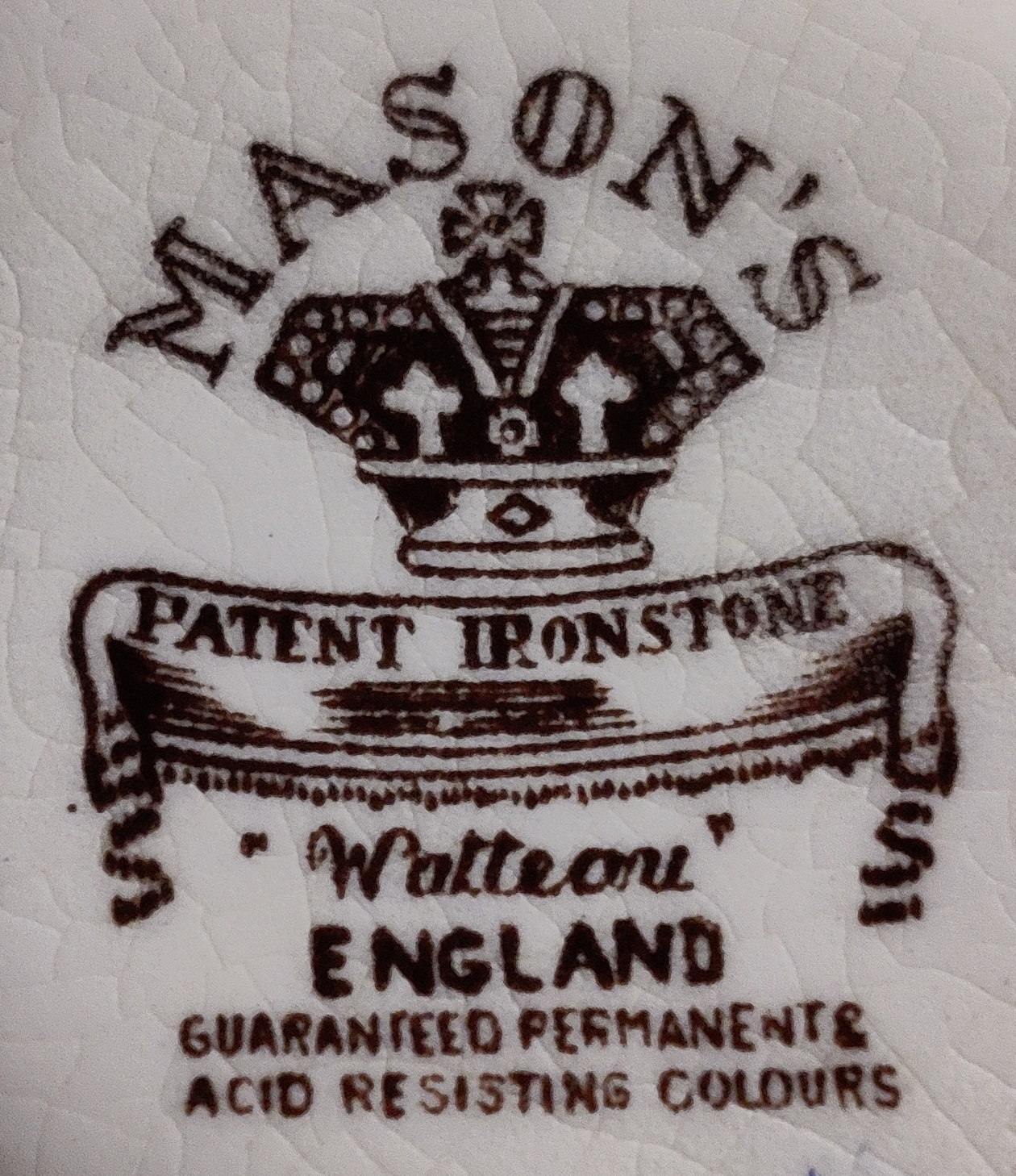
Maker's mark from the base of a 1920s Mason's 'Watteau' ironstone bowl (full piece pictured below). Note the "orange peel" texture, a defect, in the surface.

Ironstone china, ironstone ware or most commonly just ironstone, is a type of vitreous pottery first made in the United Kingdom in the early 19th century. It is often classed as earthenware although in appearance and properties it is similar to fine stoneware. It was developed in the 19th century by potters in Staffordshire, England, as a cheaper, mass-produced alternative for porcelain.

The formulation quoted in the original patent (Brit. Pat. 3724, 1813) by Charles James Mason, is four parts china clay, four parts china stone, four parts calcined flint, three parts prepared ironstone and a trace of cobalt oxide. However, it has long been known that no ironstone was used; its mention, and the name of the product, was used to suggest high strength.

Ironstone in Britain's Staffordshire potteries was closely associated with the company founded by Mason following his patent of 1813, with the name subsequently becoming generic. The strength of Mason's ironstone body enabled the company to produce ornamental objects of considerable size including vestibule vases 1.5 metres high and mantelpieces assembled from several large sections.

Antique ironstone wares are collectable, and in particular items made by Mason's.

== History ==
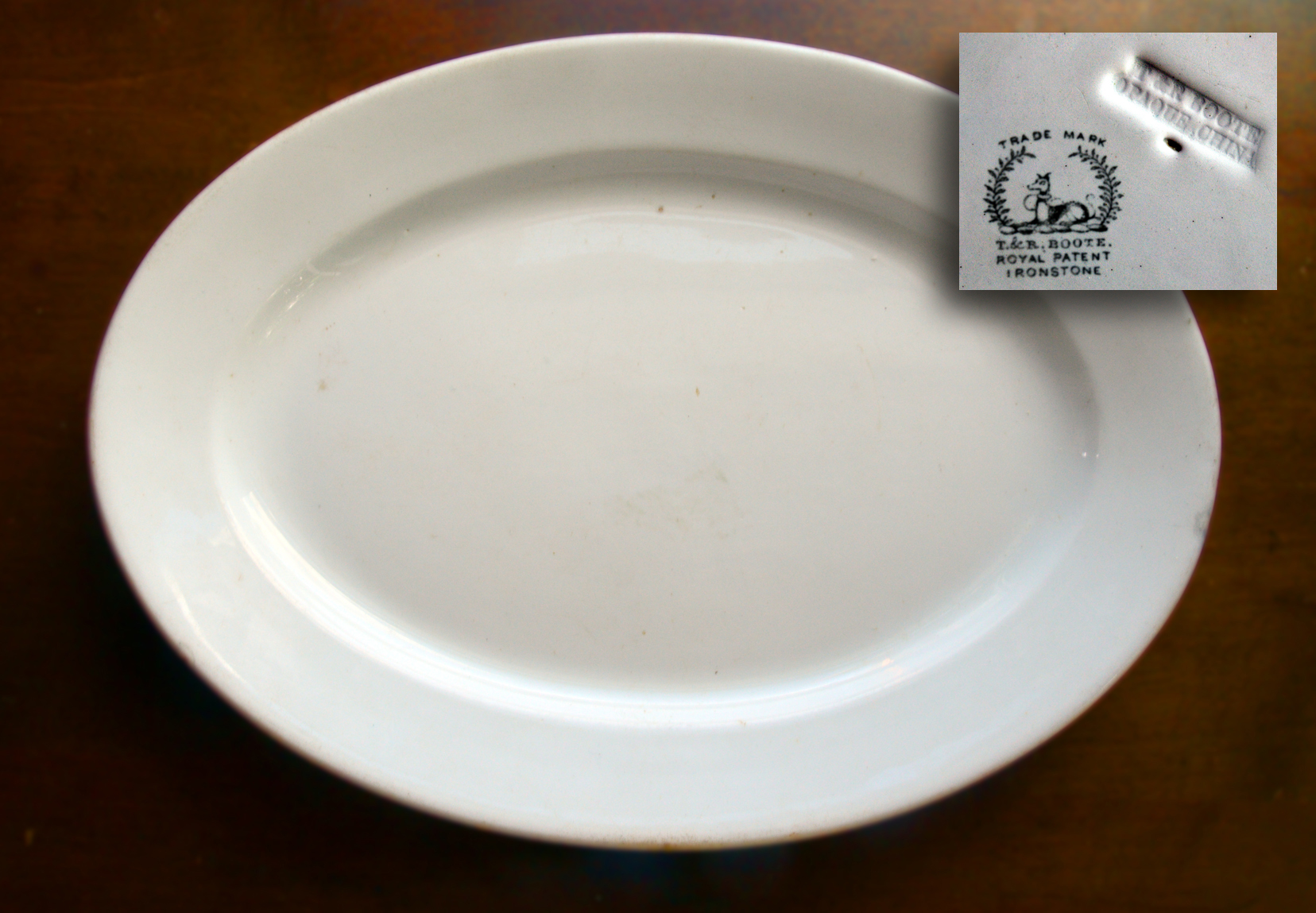
10"x13" ironstone serving platter made by T. & R. BOOTE, Burslem, c1870

Ironstone was patented by the British potter Mason in 1813. His father, Miles Mason (1752–1822) married the daughter of Richard Farrar, who had a business selling imported Oriental porcelain in London. Subsequently, Mason continued this business, but after the East India Company ceased the bulk importation of Oriental porcelain in 1791 he began to manufacture his own wares. His first manufacturing venture was a partnership with Thomas Wolfe and John Lucock in Liverpool, and he later formed a partnership with George Wolfe to manufacture pottery in Staffordshire.

Subsequently other manufacturers produced ironstone, with James Edwards (1805–1867) of the Dalehall Pottery in Staffordshire also credited as its pioneer. Other sources also attribute the invention of ironstone to William Turner of Longton, and Josiah Spode who is known to have been producing ironstone ware by 1805, "which he exported in immense quantities to France and other countries". The popularity of Spode's ironstone surpassed the traditional faience pottery in France.

A variety of ironstone types was being produced by the mid-19th century. "Derbyshire ironstone" became a particularly popular variety in the 19th century, as well as "yellow ironstone". Patterns with raised edges became popular in the mid-19th century, including "cane-coloured" Derbyshire ironstone. Some of the most well-known and collectable British ironstone manufacturers of the 19th century include:

- Church Gresley Pottery
- Edge, Malkin, Burslem, Staffordshire
- Hartshorne Pottery (founded by James Onions around 1790)
- Hartshorne Potteries (founded in 1818 by Joseph Thompson)
- Hill Top Works
- Old Midway Pottery
- Rawdon Pottery
- Sharpe Brothers
- Spode
- Spode and Copeland
- Swadlincote Potteries
- T&R BOOTE
- Waterloo Pottery
- Wooden Box Pottery
- Woodville Pottery (founded in 1833 by Thomas Hall and William Davenport)
- Woodville Potteries (founded in 1810 by Mr Watts)
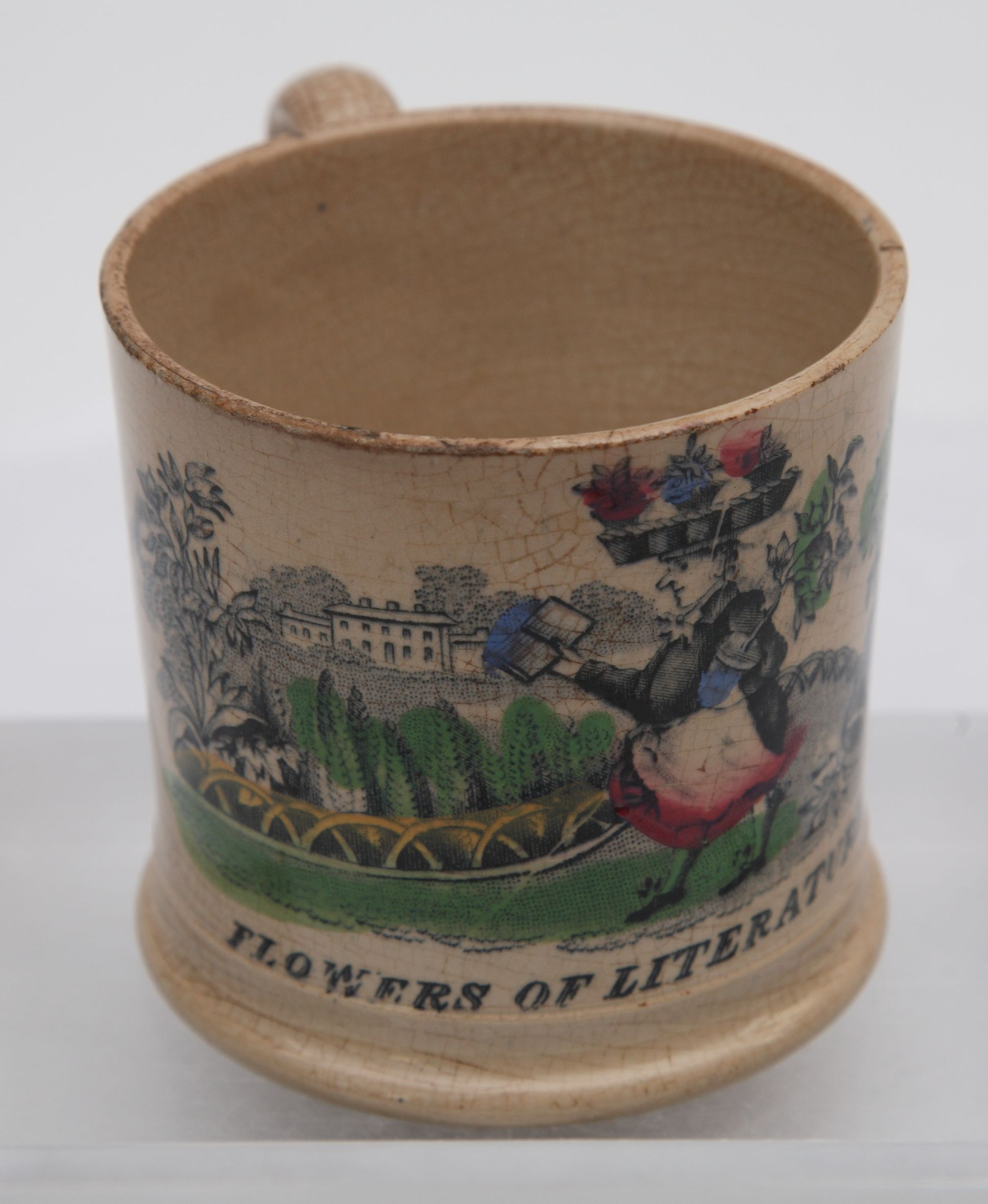
  Ironstone cup titled "Flowers of Literature"

=== United States ===
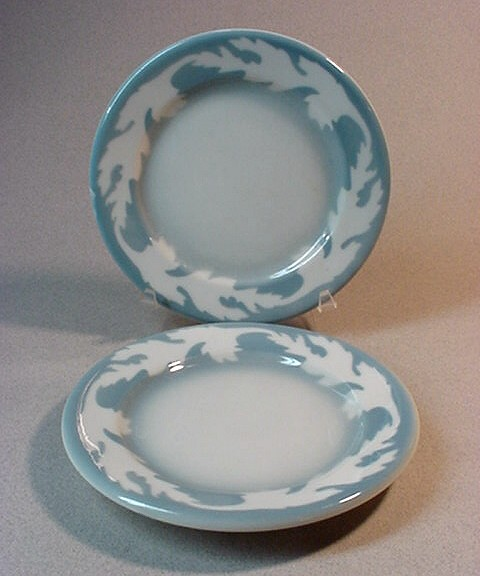
A Syracuse China example of mid-20th-century restaurant ware made of ironstone china.

In the United States, ironstone ware was being manufactured from the 1850s onward. The earliest American ironstone potters were in operation around Trenton, New Jersey. Before this, white ironstone ware was imported to the United States from England, beginning in the 1840s. Undecorated tableware was most popular in the United States, and British potteries produced white ironstone ware, known as "White Ironstone" or "White Granite" ware, for the American market. During the mid-19th century it was the largest export market for Staffordshire's potteries. In the 1860s, British manufacturers began adding agricultural motifs, such as wheat, to their products to appeal to the American market. These patterns became known as "farmers' china" or "threshers' china". Plain white ironstone ware was widely marketed in the United States until the end of the 19th century.

Notable 19th-century ironstone manufacturers in the United States include:

- Empire Pottery
- Onondaga Pottery, Syracuse China
- Walter Scott Lenox
- Homer Laughlin

== Types of ironstone ware ==
=== Transferware ===
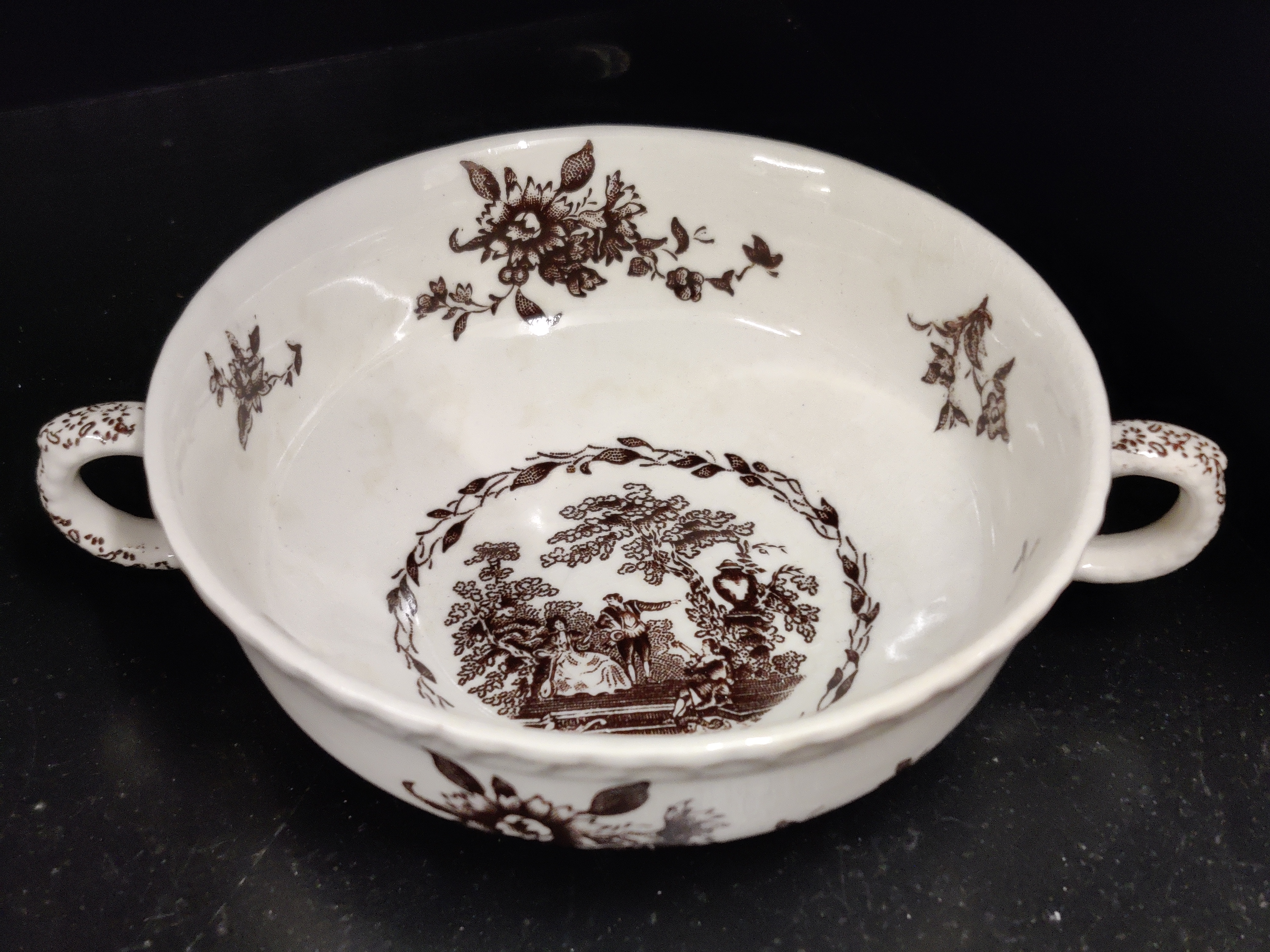
1920s Mason 'Watteau' ironstone bowl, with transfer printing (see above for maker's mark from this piece)

Transfer-printed designs were applied to ironstone by Mason's in an attempt to copy Chinese porcelain cheaply. Transferware is most often in one colour against a white background, such as blue, red, green or brown. Some patterns included detail colours that were added on top of the main transfer after the glaze had been applied.

Transferware designs range from dense patterns that cover the piece, to small motifs applied sparingly to give a delicate appearance, as with floral motifs.

== See also ==
- Chinoiserie
