= James Giles (porcelain decorator) =

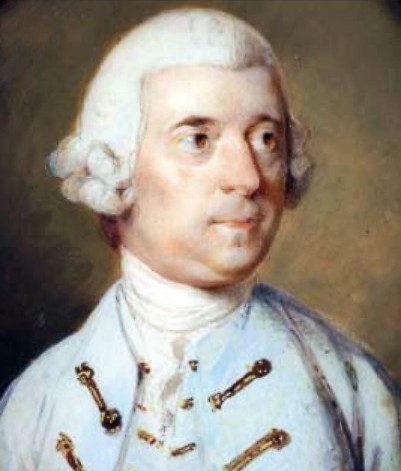
James Giles

James Giles (1718–1780) was a decorator of Worcester, Derby, Bow and Chelsea porcelain and also glass, who created gilt and enamelled objects such as decanters, drinking-glasses, perfume bottles and rosewater sprinklers, for a rococo and neoclassical market.

Producing work similar to the enameling done by the later Ralph and William Beilby of Newcastle-upon-Tyne, he maintained a showroom in fashionable Cockspur Street in London, enjoying the patronage of royalty and affluent clients including Clive of India, the Duke of Northumberland, Princess Amelia (the second daughter of George II), Thomas Pitt, the Duke of Marlborough, the painter George Stubbs and Horace Walpole.

== Family history ==
His father, also James Giles, was of a Huguenot family named 'Gilles', from Nîmes. James senior was recorded in 1729 as being a 'China Painter' and living in London. His son, Abraham, was recorded in the same year as being apprenticed to Philip Margas, of the Glass Sellers' Company, whereas James junior was indentured in 1733 to John Arthur, a jeweller at St Martin-in-the-Fields.

== Career ==
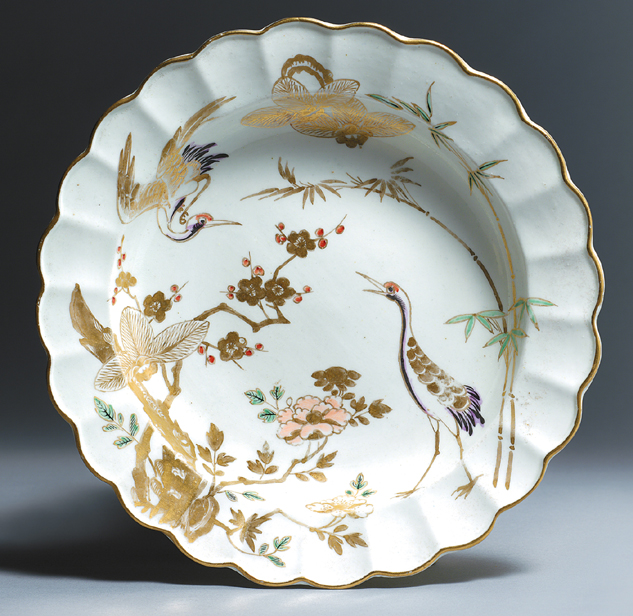
Dr. Wall Worcester porcelain dessert plate in the Japanese Arita ware style

About 1756 he rented a workshop with a kiln in Kentish Town and by 1763 had moved on to Berwick Street. A few years later he started a showroom in the Arts Museum in Cockspur Street, opposite the Haymarket, seemingly with the support of the Worcester porcelain factory. When his collaboration with Worcester ended in 1771, he moved to an address in the same street at the north-west corner of Trafalgar Square.

Giles bought his undecorated porcelain and glass from a large number of sources, resulting in glassware of great variety in shape, size and colour, in turn leading to an enormous diversity of bijouterie for the luxury trade. He advertised widely, strangely failing to mention his glassware in the many notices that were placed in "The Public Advertiser" between 1767 and 1776. His first advertisement, in "Mortimer's Universal Director" of 1763, stated that 'This ingenious Artist copies the Pattern of any China with the utmost exactness, both with respect to the Design and the Colours, either in the European or Chinese taste ... [and that] ... He has also brought the Enamel Colours to great perfection'.

The business ledgers for 1771–76 still exist. They record orders for some 50 000 Worcester pieces between 1771 and 1774, and glass bought for £234 from William Parker's Glass Warehouse in Fleet Street - a figure amounting to fifteen per cent of Giles's annual budget. William Parker was a leading glass merchant as was another of Giles's suppliers, the Falcon glasshouse, near Southwark Bridge. The business was covered by Sun Insurance policies that valued his stock at £2 000 in November 1771, substantially more than the stock valuation of £680 for the Worcester factory at that time.

== Financial problems ==
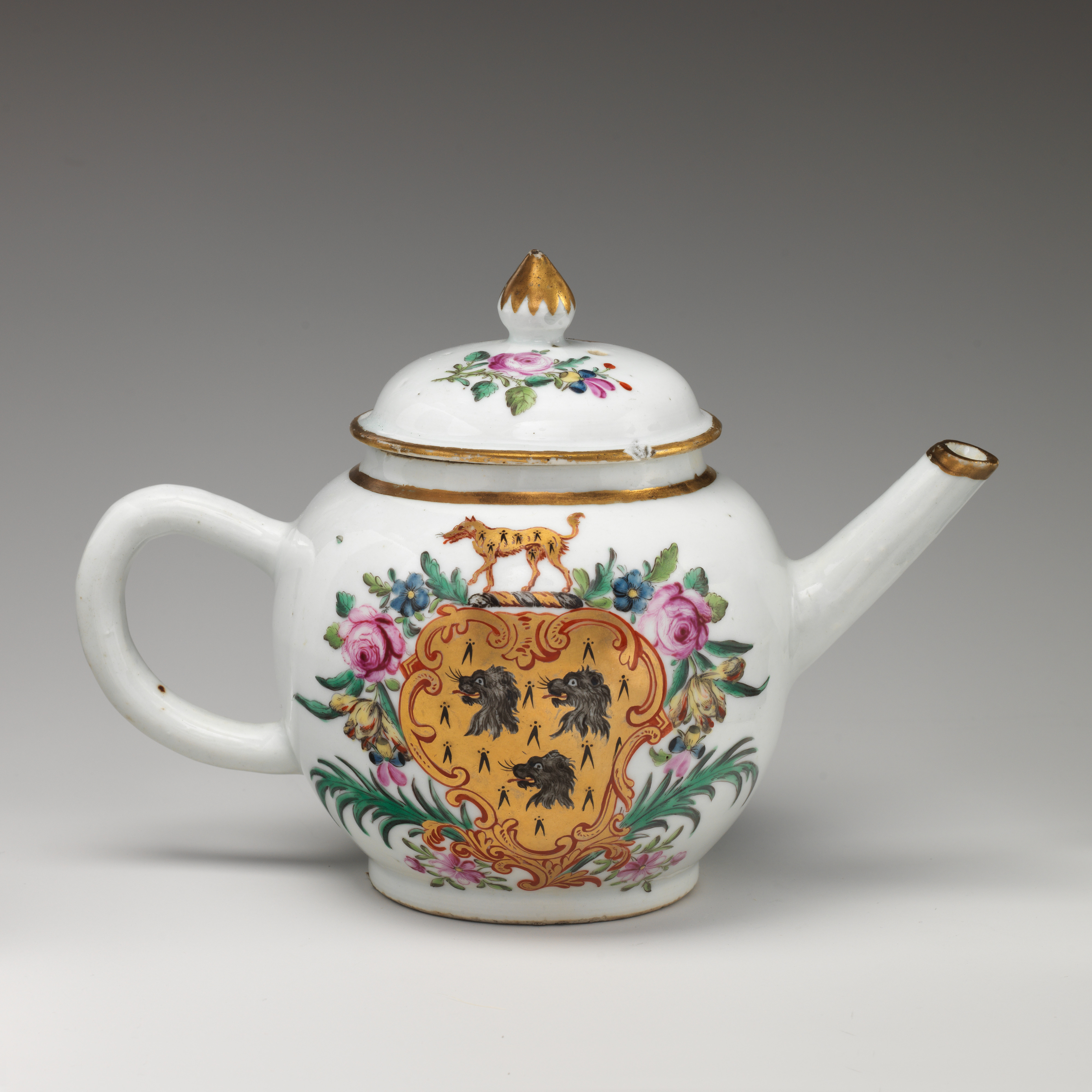
Chinese export porcelain painted by Giles

Although he created outstanding works of art, Giles was financially incompetent. Dealing with the aristocracy and the affluent led to lengthy delays in their settling of accounts - delays of a few years were commonplace. Richard Brinsley Sheridan, for instance, settled his account three years after taking delivery. Worthies such as Lord Palmerston, Lord Melbourne, Lady Jersey and the Duchess of Leinster only paid their accounts after Giles's death and under pressure from the creditors.

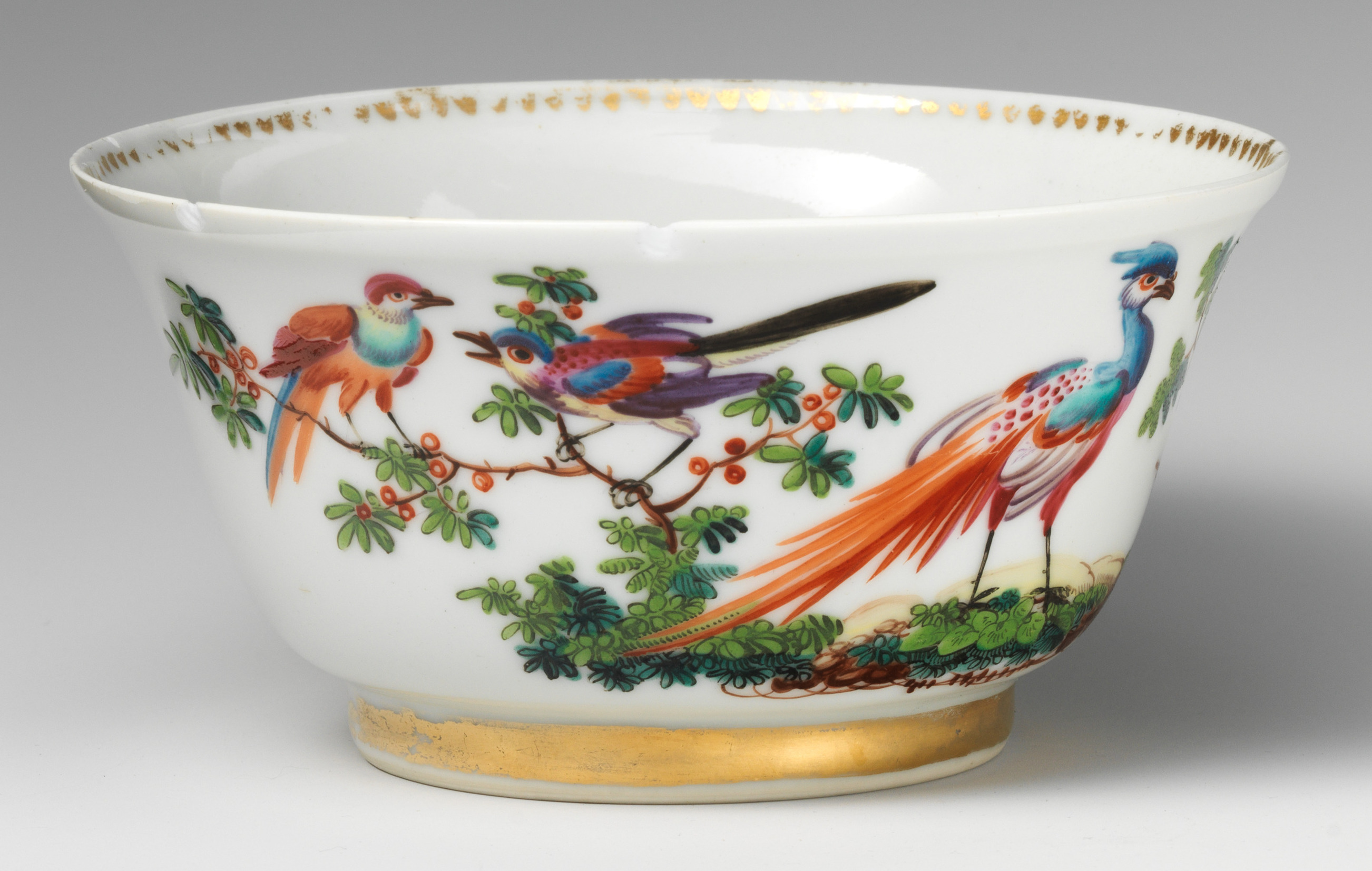
Bowl with birds

His declaration of bankruptcy in 1774 was brought about by his rivals in porcelain decorating, notably Worcester porcelain, in order to eliminate him from the trade. His many bankruptcies and their documentary trail have provided a rich source of information for modern scholars. On the other hand, he showed great skill in dealing with his staff, enabling his workshop to turn out a prodigious number of pieces of the highest quality. His staff would have included his daughters, Mary (1741–1806) and Sarah Teresa (1742–1800). Others employed were Lewis Barbar, a Swedish miniaturist and 'China Painter', and a Frenchman, Fidelle Duvivier.

== Aesthetic qualities ==
The identification of Giles's work is bedevilled by an absence of signatures or marks. Two Christie's auctions over this period help to clear up uncertainty by the complete catalogue descriptions of some 1,400 lots. His porcelain styles of decoration, despite their quality, are sometimes rightly criticised for being stylistically derivative, causing problems to all but the most knowledgeable of experts. His work in the style of Sèvres and Meissen is particularly difficult to attribute. The same observation cannot be made of his quite distinctive glasswork which in most respects was original. Some of his work was exported to America - notes from his ledger record sales between 1772 and 1775 of seven 'Parcels of China & Glass' to Sir Egerton Leigh, 1st Baronet, Attorney General of South Carolina for the princely sum of £380.
