= Bert E. Salisbury =

American businessman (1870–1946)

Bert Eugene Salisbury
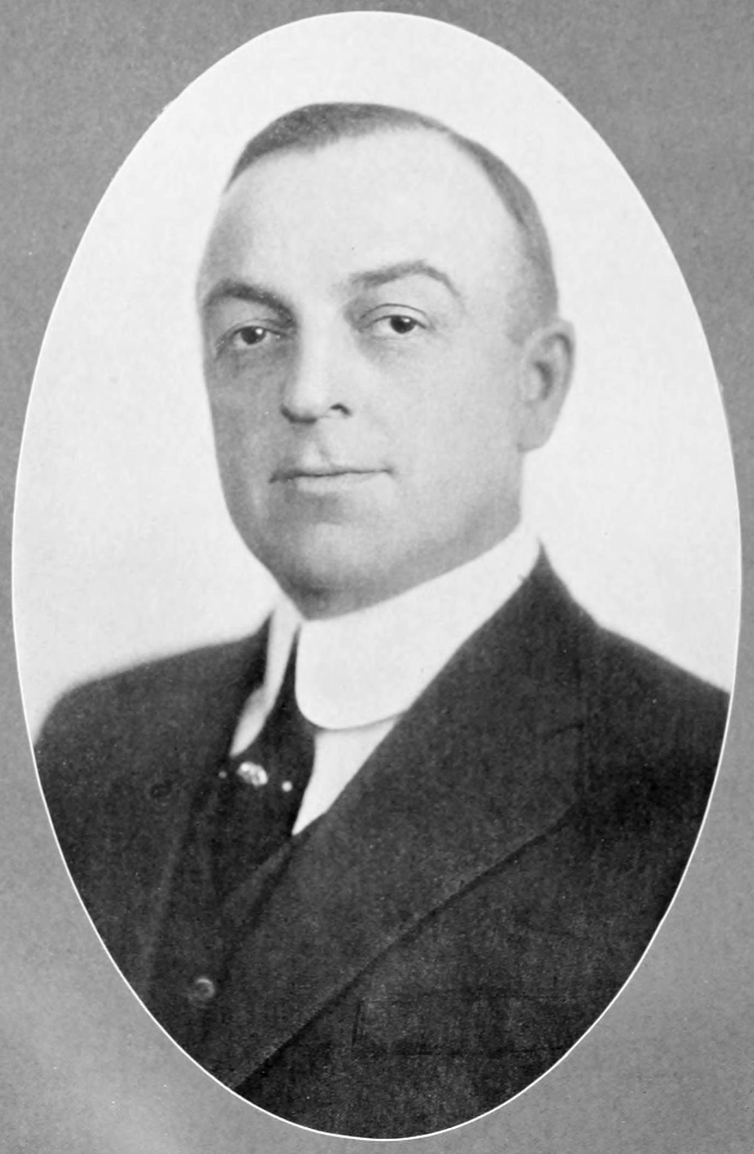
- Born: May 28, 1870; Geddes, New York, United States
- Died: October 20, 1946 (aged 76); Syracuse, New York, United States
- Occupations: Manufacturer, inventor, financier
- Spouse: Mary Patterson Pharis (m. 1895)
- Parent(s): Henry Oscar Salisbury (died 1891) and Celia Seamans Salisbury

Signature
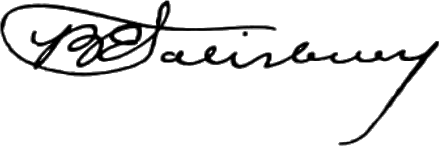

Bert Eugene Salisbury (May 28, 1870 – October 20, 1946), was appointed president of Onondaga Pottery Company (O.P.Co.), later renamed to Syracuse China in 1913, and president and general manager of Pass & Seymour, Inc. in Solvay, a suburb of Syracuse, New York, in 1914. He ran both companies for many years.

== History ==
Bert E. Salisbury was born in the town of Geddes, New York, May 28, 1870. He was the son of Henry Oscar Salisbury (1839–1891), of Columbus, New York, and Celia Seamans Salisbury (1841–1926), of Connecticut. His father was a well-known builder and contractor and had worked as a foreman in the local salt industry. The family home stood across the Erie Canal in sight of the Onondaga Pottery Company.

Salisbury pursued his early education in the Geddes Union Free School, later called Porter School. He graduated from Syracuse High School in 1890. There were 43 students in his class including Edward S. Van Duyn, (1872–1955) who later was a prominent surgeon in Syracuse. Salisbury attended Cazenovia Seminary (now Cazenovia College to prepare for the ministry until illness forced him to leave.

=== Early career ===
For a short period after 1890, while he was still attending college, Bert Salisbury was also employed by the Solvay Process Company in Solvay, New York on the southern edge of Syracuse. He also worked for his father for a brief time.

=== Pass & Seymour company ===
In February 1891, Salisbury was hired by Pass & Seymour, Inc. in Syracuse. He was promoted to superintendent in 1898. By 1900, the company outgrew its site on the canal and moved to a new factory in Solvay, New York. By 1901, at age 30, he was named secretary and general manager and secretary of its board of directors.

The company made ceramic insulators, lamp sockets, switches and fuse blocks, nearly all of which contained ceramic parts. By January, 1914 he was appointed president and general manager.

At the time Salisbury was president of Pass & Seymour, Inc., the company employed 400 workmen.

=== Onondaga Pottery ===
In 1910, Salisbury was director of the Onondaga Pottery Company (O.P.Co.), later renamed to Syracuse China. Three years later, in 1913, he was elected president and treasurer, succeeding James Pass.

Salisbury performed the duties of president of both Pass & Seymour Company and Syracuse China until 1928. At that time, James Pass was named president of Pass & Seymour Company.

=== Affiliations ===
Salisbury was director of the First National Bank of Syracuse and Morris Plan Bank, Syracuse. He was also a member of the board of governors of Associated Manufacturers of Electrical Supplies and a member of the Chamber of Commerce.

Some of his other duties included, president of the Billy Sunday Business Men's Club of Syracuse; trustee of Syracuse University and Cazenovia Seminary. He was a member of the Central New York Methodist Episcopal Conference and trustee of Myrtle Hill Cemetery. He was vice-president of YMCA, and a member of the Efficiency Society of New York, the American Ceramic Society, the Electrical Manufacturers' Club, the Engineer's Club of New York, the Jovian Order, the Technology Club, the Citizen's Club, the Onondaga Golf and Country Club, Bellevue Country Club and the Mystic Crewe.

In January 1941, while still president of Onondaga Pottery Company, he was elected to the Board of Directors of First Trust & Deposit Company. Also on the board were Huntington B. Crouse, president of Crouse-Hinds Company and John C. Marcellus, president of Marcellus Casket Company.

Salisbury also held membership in and was a trustee of the West Genesee Methodist Episcopal Church.

=== Cazenovia College ===
In his youth, Salisbury attended Cazenovia Seminary which was established in 1824. By February 1941, he was a member of the Board of Trustees and was former board president. The institution was chartered as a junior college in 1934 and renamed to Cazenovia College. The school was recognized as a bachelor's degree granting institution in 1988.

=== Personal life ===
On December 3, 1895, Bert Salisbury was married to Mary Patterson Pharis of Syracuse who was born on June 24, 1871, in Geddes. She was the daughter of Mills Patterson Pharis and Eliza Anne Webb (born in January, 1834), of 600 Lowell Avenue. Mary was an 1894 fine arts graduate of Syracuse University, a music teacher and a member of Alpha Phi fraternity.

The couple had four children:.

- Katherine Pharis Salisbury (born February 13, 1905 – November 19, 2003) married Harold Locke Hazen (August 1, 1901 – February 21, 1980) on September 5, 1928 in her parents' home at 1810 West Genesee Street.
- Robert Mills Salisbury (born December 25, 1906 - May 14, 1989)
- Henry Webb Salisbury (born October 5, 1908 - May 16, 1938)
- William Root Salisbury (June 20, 1911 - April 6, 1990)

The family lived at 1810 West Genesee Street in Syracuse and their summer home was located on Fourth Lake in the Adirondack Mountains. By 1940, the family had moved to 315 Berkeley Drive which was designed by prominent Syracuse architect, Dwight James Baum. They lived briefly at 412 Berkeley Drive while this house was being built.

Salisbury died at home, of a cerebral hemorrhage, on October 20, 1946. He and his wife are buried in the family plot in Oakwood Cemetery, Syracuse.

==== Robert Salisbury, eldest son ====
His son, Robert Salisbury, was born on December 25, 1906, in Syracuse. He was married on September 20, 1930, to Dorothy MacMillan, daughter of E. J. McMillan, well known in Canton, New York in South Presbyterian Church in Syracuse. She was the granddaughter of Henry Bullis. He and his wife are buried in the family plot in Oakwood Cemetery. They had a daughter and two sons.

==== Henry Webb Salisbury ====
Son, Henry Webb Salisbury, was a pilot for Northwest Airlines, residing in Minneapolis, Minn. He and his entire family were killed in an airplane crash. They are buried in the family plot in Oakwood Cemetery, Syracuse.

==== William Root Salisbury, youngest son ====
His son, William Root Salisbury, was born on June 20, 1911, in Syracuse. He was married to Ethel Gardner, who was born on July 11, 1911. Salisbury had homes in both Central New York at 35 Lyndon Road in Fayetteville and Vero Beach, Florida, where he died on April 6, 1990. His wife, Ethel, died on April 4, 2004, while residing in Marblehead, Massachusetts, where their daughter, Judith, lived.

The couple had three children:

- Marilyn Salisbury
- Judith Salisbury
- William Lawrence Salisbury

=== Recognition and memorials ===
Salisbury Road in Westvale, New York, a suburb on the west side of Syracuse was named after him.
