= Harold Locke Hazen =

American electrical engineer

Harold Locke Hazen (August 1, 1901 – February 21, 1980) was an American electrical engineer. He contributed to the theory of servomechanisms and feedback control systems. In 1924 under the lead of Vannevar Bush, Hazen and his fellow undergraduate Hugh H. Spencer built a prototype AC network analyzer, a special-purpose analog computer for solving problems in interconnected AC power systems. Hazen also worked with Bush over twenty years on such projects as the mechanical differential analyzer. This early work, and the binary algebra used, would be foundational to the emergence of electromechanical and digital computers in later decades.

== Education and career ==
Hazen was born at Philo, Illinois in 1901. Several years later, his parents moved to Three Rivers, Michigan, where he graduated from high school. He went to Massachusetts Institute of Technology (MIT) as an undergraduate student in 1920. When he graduated from MIT in 1924, he briefly worked for General Electric. In 1925 he returned to MIT as research assistant and instructor in 1926. he obtained his master's degree in 1929 and his Doctor of Science degree in 1931.

In 1934 Hazen published two papers on the theory and design of servomechanisms which provided clear descriptions of the operation of servos and a design methodology.

After 1937 Hazen became increasingly involved in teaching and administrative work, becoming Head of department in 1938 and serving for fourteen years. From December 1942 until 1946 he was head of Division 7, "Fire Control", of the NDRC (National Defence Research Committee). In 1952 he became Dean of the MIT Graduate School until his retirement in 1967.

In 1928 he was married to Katherine Pharis Salisbury (1905-2003), eldest child of Bert E. Salisbury and Mary Patterson Pharis. They had two sons and two daughters.

In his later life Dr. Hazen promoted engineering education programs both in the United States and internationally. Harold Hazen died in Belmont, Massachusetts, in February 1980.

Dr. Hazen and his wife resided in Belmont, Massachusetts, except for living in Columbus, Ohio during the 1934–1935 academic year when he was named the first exchange professor between MIT and Ohio State University.
