= Iroquois China Company =

American pottery company

- Type: China and Pottery Manufacturing
- Industry: Pottery
- Genre: Restaurant dinnerware
- Founded: 1905
- Founder: J. Brewster Gere and Lemont Stillwell
- Defunct: 1969
- Headquarters: Syracuse, New York, United States
- Area served: United States
- Products: Vitreous China tableware

Iroquois China Company was founded in 1905 in Solvay, New York, located on the western border of Syracuse near the southern shores of Onondaga Lake. It operated in Syracuse until closing. Although some references indicate that the company closed in 1969, certain designs (e.g., "Informal", "Museum White") were advertised and sold until the early-mid 1970s.

Russel Wright and Ben Seibel were among the main mid-century modernist designers at Iroquois. Wright introduced Casual around 1950, and Seibel designed a line called Impromptu that stayed in the line for the rest of the company's history.

Among the firm's designs were Bridal White, Frolic, Vision, Jardinieres, Pins and Beads, and in 1956, new geometric patterns like Parasols and Pyramids. Other abstract patterns included Aztec, Fjord, Tiara, Pompon, Tiara, Pompon Garland and El Camino. Grapes and Beige Rose were other later additions to the company's lines. Like nearby competitor Syracuse China, Iroquois phased out production for residential use in the late 1960s.

== Back stamps ==
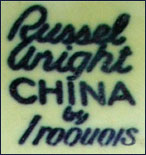
Iroquois China Company back stamp - Russel Wright - Syracuse, New York - c. 1950

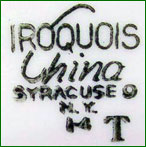
Iroquois China Company back stamp - Syracuse, New York - c.1955

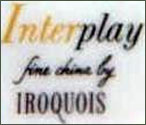
Iroquois China Company back stamp Interplay by Russell Wright - Syracuse, New York - c.1955

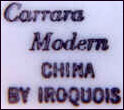
Iroquois China Company back stamp Carrara Modern White - Syracuse, New York - c.1955

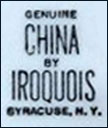
Iroquois China Company back stamp - Syracuse, New York - c.1965

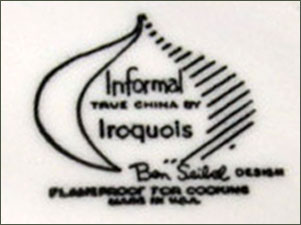
Iroquois China Company back stamp - Informal designed by Ben Seibel and manufactured between 1969 and 1973 - "Informal / True China / Iroquois / Ben Seibel Design / Flameproof for Cooking / Made in USA."

== Advertisements ==
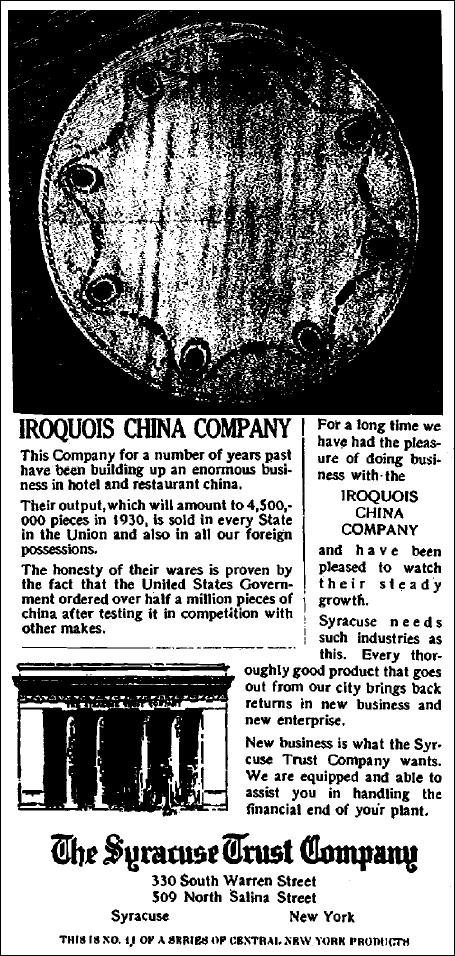
Iroquois China Company business customer of the Syracuse Trust Company - Syracuse Post-Standard, 1919
