= Worshipful Company of Glass Sellers =

Livery company of the City of London

Worshipful Company of Glass Sellers coat of arms

The Worshipful Company of Glass Sellers (Glass Sellers' Company) is one of the livery companies of the City of London. The company received its royal charter from King Charles II in 1664. Its role was to regulate the glass selling and pot-making industries within the City of London, and to ensure quality and fair trade. Aspiring traders in glass were apprenticed to a master who was a member of the Glass Sellers Company. He in turn was accountable to the court and officers of the livery and ultimately to the master of the company.

Today the role of the company is to stimulate interest in the many and varied aspects of glass and carry out charitable works, with special emphasis on education.

Representatives of almost all the sectors of the modern glass industry are members of the livery. These include the manufacture and sale of container glass, medical glass, art glass and the telecommunications, media and technology sector.

== History ==
The Worshipful Company of Glass Sellers of London ranks 71st in precedence among the City of London's livery companies and received its incorporated royal charter in 1664. This, together with an earlier charter dated 1635 which was not incorporated by the Court of Aldermen, for reasons which are now obscure, are both still held by the company. The 1630s were troubled times and problems in the glass trade periodically collided with a background of political unrest.

Within the City of London there already were livery companies controlling the manufacture and quality of glazing for windows and spectacle manufacture; and the new Glass Sellers Company was therefore established to cover all other parts of the glass trade. It was to be responsible not only for the production of drinking vessels and tableware, but also for the manufacture of looking-glasses and glass vials – such as those then used in the making of hour glasses.

The main task of the new company, all of whose members were previously members of other London companies, was dominated by retailers – often those working with china, which was then imported from China in large-scale lots for sale to retailers at auction.

== Charitable activities ==
The Worshipful Company of Glass Sellers Charity Fund supports the wider glass industry through its awards, provides scholarships and bursaries for education, and supports the City and its specific appeals and the less privileged in and around the City of London.

=== The Glass Sellers' Art & Craft Award ===
Working under the patronage of the Worshipful Company of Glass Sellers, George Ravenscroft made his famous discovery of lead crystal. Its manufacture subsequently began in 1674 at his workshop which is on the site now occupied by the Savoy Hotel in the Strand. Since then the Glass Sellers Company has continued, in various ways to support the art of glassmaking, consolidating this in the main, in two awards for glass art. The Glass Sellers Prize used to be an annual award but since 2008, it has been linked to the British Glass Biennale and is awarded biennially.

== See also ==
- chinaman (porcelain) – the trade in imported chinaware
