= Miles Mason =

British businessman (1752–1822)

Miles Mason (1752–1822) was a chinaman in Fenchurch Street who sold imported porcelain from China. When these imports ceased, he developed a successful replacement – ironstone china – which was then exported to other countries.
