= Syracuse China =

Defunct company in New York state

- Company type: China and Pottery Manufacturing
- Industry: Pottery
- Genre: Restaurant dinnerware
- Founded: 1871
- Defunct: 2009
- Fate: Bought out by Libbey Inc. of Toledo, Ohio - all production moved from North America
- Headquarters: Syracuse, New York, United States
- Area served: United States
- Key people: Lyman W. Clark, Richard H. Pass, James Pass, Bert E. Salisbury
- Products: Vitreous China tableware, earthenware & bone china
- Subsidiaries: Country Ware Corp. (1975)

Syracuse China, located in Lyncourt, New York (a suburb of Syracuse), was a manufacturer of fine china. Founded in 1871 as Onondaga Pottery Company (O.P. Co.) in the town of Geddes, the company initially produced earthenware; in the late 19th century, O.P.Co., began producing fine china, for which it found a strong market particularly in hotels, restaurants, and railroad dining cars. Later changing their name to match their product line, the company closed in 2009.

== History ==
In 1841, W. H. Farrar started a small pottery business in the town of Geddes, New York. Seventeen years later he moved the business to the location of what would become the Onondaga Pottery Company and eventually Syracuse China. Farrar produced whiskey jugs, butter crocks, and mixing bowls in stoneware. A few years later the Empire Pottery company was organized to take over the Farrar Pottery. A line of "whiteware" for table use was added. Like most pottery of the time, it was susceptible to "crazing" - small cracks in the glazed surface. The company struggled along until 1871 at which time Onondaga Pottery Company was organized and took over.

Popular taste demanded a finer ceramic tableware than the heavy pottery made by these companies. Onondaga Pottery started producing a heavy earthenware called "Ironstone" but struggle to succeed. In 1873, they began manufacturing a "white graniteware" and then in 1885 a semi-vitreous ware. A year later they replaced this with high fired china and a guarantee that the glaze would not crackle or craze - the first time American-made tableware carried such a warranty. It was at this point, 45 years after the start of pottery production in Syracuse that the pottery business showed a stable and profitable prospect.

Under President James Pass, O.P.Co. developed a new china body and won the medal for translucent china at the World's Columbian Exposition in Chicago in 1893. Around 1888, Pass developed the a vitreous, translucent, and non-absorbent clay body. It was released to the public after 1890 as Imperial Geddo, and made the company the industry leader. The company also manufactured electrical porcelain circuit breakers and insulators.

In 1897, production turned to the vitreous china body. Its first colored china body, "Old Ivory," appeared in 1926. The company thrived with its hotel and railroad sales. The narrow-bodied "Econo-Rim" was tailored for the cramped table space of dining cars. Highly sought after collectible patterns sell regularly on eBay and at estate sales.

Onondaga officially changed their name to Syracuse China in 1966 after their most popular line of products. The company was renowned for its fine china designs until 1970 when it limited its production to mostly restaurant dinnerware.

== Syracuse China of Canada ==
In 1959, the Syracuse China Corp. acquired a controlling interest in Vandesca Pottery, Ltd. of Joliette, Quebec. Their factory, opened in 1947, was Canada's sole manufacturer of vitrified commercial china. After the merger they would be known as Vandesca-Syracuse Ltd. and the size of the factory would be more than doubled with 100 employees by the late 1960s. The plant would close in 1994 and the site has been divided into smaller industrial and commercial tenants.

== End of production ==
On April 9, 2009, after 138 years of production, the Syracuse China factory was shut down by Libbey, Inc. and all production of Syracuse China moved from North America. At that time, the plant had 275 employees.

On the last day of production, each employee was given a commemorative plate with a montage of images from throughout the company's history and eight of the company logos used over the course of the company's history. The face of the plate states, "Though the world may change around us, our history remains the same."

The back of each plate was stamped "38-A," the last date stamp to appear on a Syracuse China product made in Syracuse. The "38" is code for the year it was made (1971, the company's centennial year, plus 38 years). The "A" stands for the first quarter of the year. The back of each plate also has text indicating it was one of the last "pieces to be made in Syracuse, N.Y."

The archives and china collections were donated to the Onondaga Historical Association.

In June 2020, Libbey announced plans to file for Chapter 11 bankruptcy protection as the result of negative financial effects caused by the COVID-19 pandemic. Despite the closure of the company eleven years before the bankruptcy, Syracuse China was still listed as an asset in the bankruptcy. In October 2020, Libbey emerged from Chapter 11. In December 2020, Libbey closed its Shreveport plant putting 450 employees out of work.

== The "Turner-Over Club" ==
Syracuse China sponsored the Turner-Over Club (later the Turn-Over Club) as a promotion for decades. The company gave out membership cards, with the idea that wherever members traveled, they would "turn over" their dinnerware to see if it was Syracuse China; witnesses to this curious behavior would then be treated to the story of the club and thus introduced to the brand name.
