= 2008 Cardiff and District National Eisteddfod =

2008 eisteddfod in Cardiff, Wales

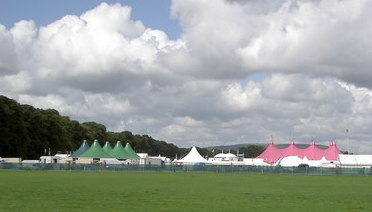
- 2008 Eisteddfod in Pontcanna Fields
- Native name: Eisteddfod Genedlaethol Cymru Caerdydd a'r Cylch 2008
- Date: 2–9 August 2008
- Duration: 8 days
- Location: Pontcanna Fields, Cardiff, Wales; 51.492°N 3.198°W
- Theme: Welsh language and culture

The 2008 Cardiff and District National Eisteddfod (Welsh: Eisteddfod Genedlaethol Cymru Caerdydd a'r Cylch 2008) was held in Pontcanna Fields, Cardiff, Wales, from 2 to 9 August 2008. This was the first time the National Eisteddfod of Wales had been held in Cardiff for 30 years.

== Background ==
The National Eisteddfod of Wales had been held every year since 1861, with the exception of 1914 because of World War I. It is hosted by a different region of Wales each year, alternating between north and south Wales. The main competition events are the Crowning of the Bard and the Chairing of the Bard.

The National Eisteddfod had first been held in Cardiff in 1883, but most recently had been held in the city in 1978.

== Proclamation ==
The proclamation of the Cardiff Eisteddfod took place in the city on 16 June 2007. A procession led by the Gorsedd of Bards had been due to take place along St Mary Street, culminating at Coopers Field. However, because of bad weather the proclamation event was relocated to the campus of the University of Wales Institute, Cardiff, in Cyncoed. Former international rugby player Robin McBryde carried the Gorsedd sword for the first time, taking over from fellow rugby player, Ray Gravell.

== Preparations ==
A working committee, involving the emergency services and other key organisations, was set up in 2003 to make plans for the Eisteddfod, in advance of Cardiff being formally confirmed as the 2008 venue.

The sports pitches of Pontcanna Fields were covered with gravel in preparation for the Eisteddfod event, with Cardiff Council budgetting £390,000 to clean up and restore the field afterwards. The local authority said they would use the arrival of the Eisteddfod as a reason to improve the parkland, though local sports clubs accused the council of "putting the Eisteddfod first".

== 2008 location and facilities ==
The Eisteddfod Maes was located on Pontcanna Fields, approximately 20 minutes walk from Cardiff's main railway stations. There were park and ride facilities located in the Cardiff Bay area for people arriving by car.

The focus of the Maes was the main (pink) pavilion. An adult day ticket to the Maes cost £12.

== Notable awards and events ==
=== Crowning of the Bard ===
25-year-old Aberystwyth student, Hywel Griffiths, won the 2008 crown for his collection of free-verse poetry about his experiences of the city of Cardiff. He was the youngest winner since 1978. He won the crown, made by Anglesey's Karen Williams, and £750. Griffiths had been inducted into the Gorsedd of Bards on Sunday, the day before winning the crown, because he had won the Urdd Eisteddfod chair in 2004 and 2007.

=== Chairing of the Bard ===
In 2008 this was a particularly keenly anticipated event because the chair had not been awarded in Cardiff since 1938. At the National Eisteddfods in Cardiff in 1978 and 1960 there was no-one deemed worthy of winning it. The 2008 chair was designed by a designer from Cardiff, Bethan Gray, and made by Alex McDonald from Pembrokeshire. Hilma Lloyd Edwards, of Bontnewydd, near Caernarfon, won the prize of the chair and £750. Her cynghanedd poem was on the theme of Tir Newydd (New Land).

== Aftermath ==
The Cardiff Eisteddfod made an overall surplus of £38,000.

The bad waterlogging and damage of Pontcanna Fields, as a result of the Cardiff Eisteddfod, led to Cardiff Council spending £400,000 on under-soil drains to the football pitches. Refurbishment was still underway two years later.

Following the 2008 event, the Eisteddfod organisers asked Cardiff Council if they could use Pontcanna Fields on a regular basis. The request was turned down by the then Liberal Democrat council leader, Rodney Berman, because of the damage caused in 2008. The next visit of the National Eisteddfod to Cardiff in 2018 saw the event held, without a fence, in Cardiff Bay.
