= 2025 Margam Park Urdd National Eisteddfod =

2025 Welsh-language youth festival

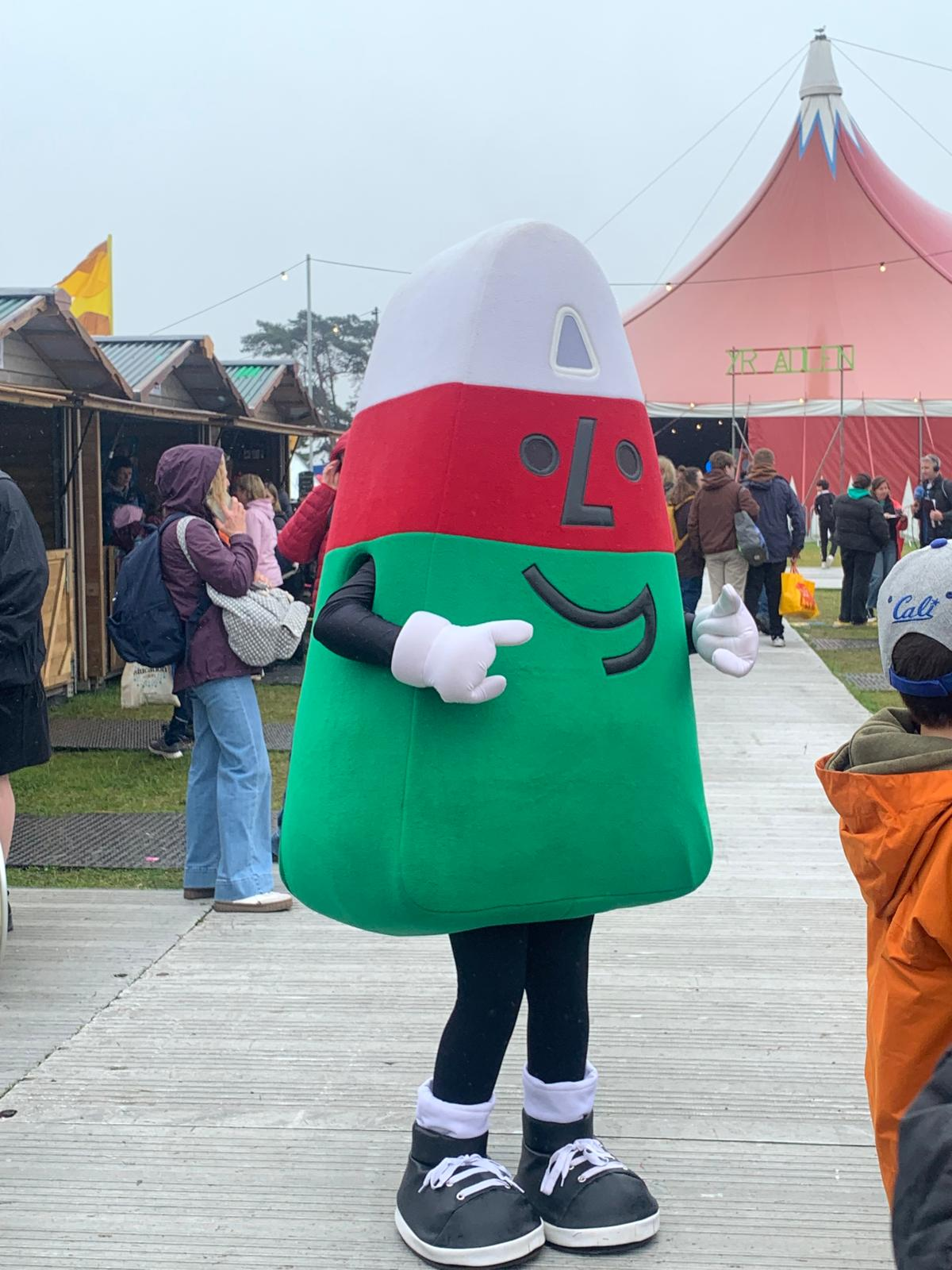
- Mistar Urdd in Margam Park
- Native name: Eisteddfod Genedlaethol yr Urdd Dur a Môr Margam a'r Fro 2025
- Date: 26–31 May 2025
- Duration: 6 days
- Location: Margam Park, Neath Port Talbot, Wales; 51.561°N 3.724°W
- Theme: Welsh language youth culture

The 2025 Margam Park Urdd National Eisteddfod (Welsh: Eisteddfod Genedlaethol yr Urdd Dur a Môr Margam a'r Fro 2025) was held in Margam Country Park, Neath Port Talbot, Wales, from 26 May to 31 May 2025.

Organisers, the Urdd Gobaith Cymru, announced a record 119,593 competitor registrations in 2025.

== Background ==
The Urdd National Eisteddfod of Wales is the largest youth festival in Europe and had been held every year since 1929 (except 1941–45), organised by the Urdd Gobaith Cymru. The festival gives an opportunity for school children and young people to compete in a variety of events, celebrating Welsh culture and the Welsh language, covering all aspects of the school curriculum. Modern day competitions include literature, music and the performing arts. The Urdd Eisteddfod normally takes place to coincide with the half term school holiday, around the beginning of June.

The Urdd Eisteddfod had previously been held at Margam Park in 2003. On 24 April 2023, representatives met at The Orangery in Margam Park and decided the 2025 Urdd National Eisteddfod would be held again in the park.

With thousands of job losses announced in the nearby steelworks in 2024, it was hoped the Urdd Eisteddfod would bring some positive news to the area and "pull everyone together". The 2025 Chair prize was made from the last piece of iron ore from the local Tata steelworks, while the 2025 Crown prize incorporated local steel, together with tin and blue velvet.

In an ongoing commitment to make free tickets available to low-income families, the Welsh Government invested £200,000 in 2025.

== 2025 location and facilities ==
The main Eisteddfod events took place on the Maes located near Margam Castle in Margam Country Park. The location was close to the M4 motorway for access by car. A free shuttle bus was available for visiors coming by train to Port Talbot Parkway.

Tickets cost £23 for adults and £15 for children (or £12 for competitors).

An open-air youth show called Dal dy Ddur was performed on the opening evening in front of Margam Orangery.

There were three main pavilions where ceremonies and competitions took place, in the colours of Mistar Urdd: white, green and red. In addition there were multiple tents and areas for events and activities, such as the Gwyddonle ('Science place' science and technology tent); Yr Adlen ('The Awning') for learning circus skills; Art, Design and Technology tent; Cwiar Na nOg tent, for LGBTQ+ events.

== Notable awards and competitions ==
There were 119,593 competitor registrations in 2025 and 400 competitions took place during the week.

- The Chair prize was awarded to the best poet of no more than 100 lines of strict metre or free verse on the subject of 'Sand'. The 2025 winner was Elain Roberts, who worked for Plaid Cymru in London. She had won the Drama Medal in 2023, so was the first person to win both. Her win also meant that, for the first time, female poets had won the Chair for three consecutive years. Tesni Peers from Wrexham came second and Celt John from Aberystwyth came third, with all three being offered a writing course at Tŷ Newydd Writing Centre in Llanystumdwy.
- 17 entries were received for the 2025 Crown competition, whose task was to write a piece of prose over 2,500 words on the subject of Toddi / Ymdoddi ('to melt'). The winner of the Crown was 24-year-old Mali Elwy, a graduate in Welsh and Creative Writing from Bangor University. In second place was Catrin Morris from Llanberis. Elain Roberts (the winner of the eisteddfod’s Chair) came third.
- The Drama Medal was won by Elin Undeg Williams of Betws Gwerful Goch, Denbighshire. The 19-year-old was a law student at Aberystwyth University and had previously won the Urdd Chair prize.
- Rafik Harrington from Cardiff won the Main Composer Prize.
- Six new awards were introduced in 2025 by the Royal Welsh College of Music & Drama, namely The Sir Bryn Terfel Award (singing), The Amy Dowden Award (dance), The Callum Scott Howells Award (musical theatre), The Matthew Rhys Award (acting and reciting), The Rakhi Singh Award (instrumental) and The Sarah Hemsley-Cole Award (backstage).

== See also ==
- 2022 Denbighshire Urdd National Eisteddfod
- 2025 Wrexham National Eisteddfod
