= 2022 Denbighshire Urdd National Eisteddfod =

2022 Welsh-language youth festival

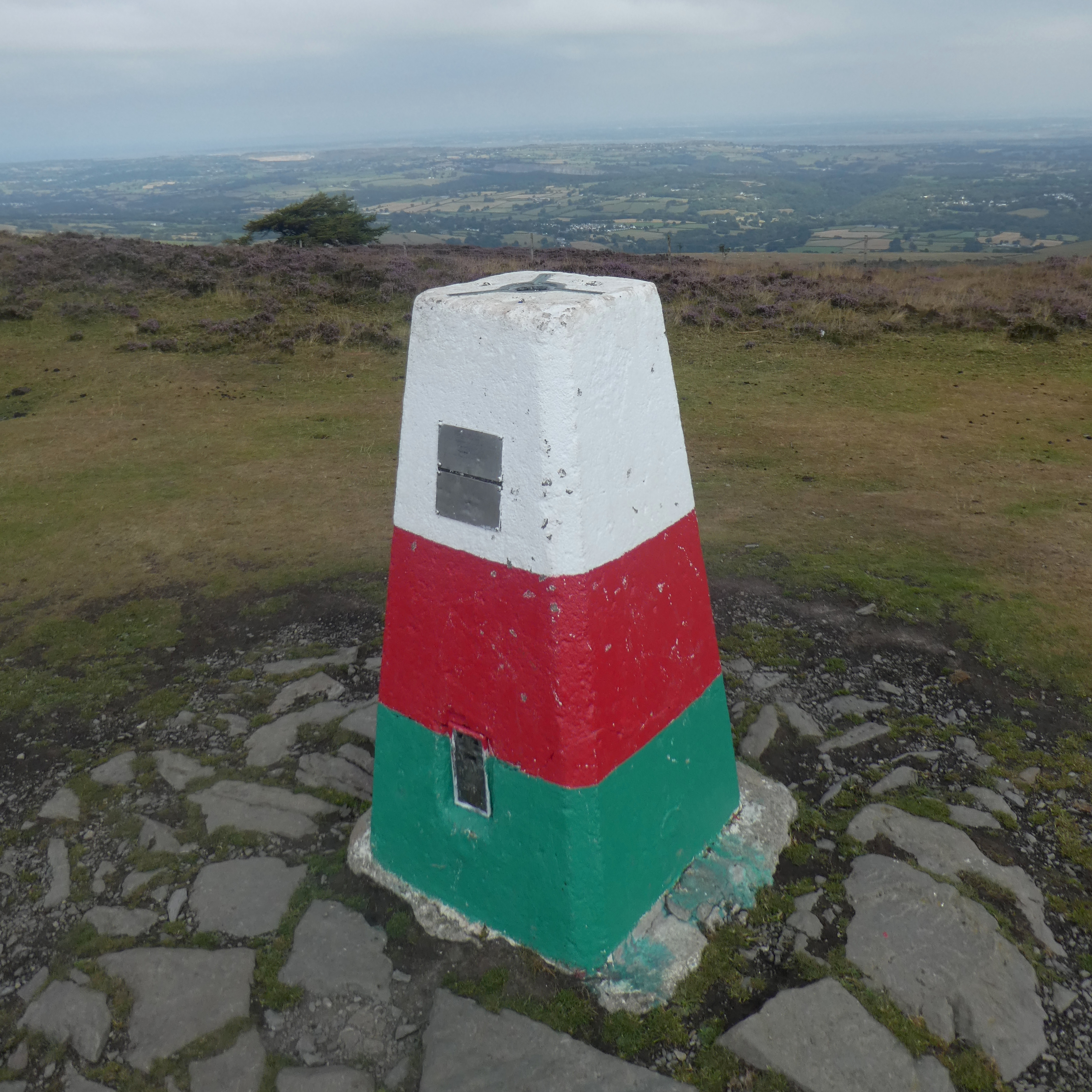
- Trig point in Urdd colours on Moel Famau, Denbighshire
- Native name: Eisteddfod Genedlaethol yr Urdd, Sir Ddinbych 2022
- Date: 30 May – 4 June 2022
- Duration: 6 days
- Location: Kilford Farm, Denbigh, Wales; 53°11′07″N 3°22′50″W
- Theme: Welsh language youth culture

The 2022 Denbighshire Urdd National Eisteddfod (Welsh: Eisteddfod Genedlaethol yr Urdd, Sir Ddinbych 2022) was held near Denbigh, Denbighshire, Wales, from 30 May to 4 June 2022. This was the second time the Urdd National Eisteddfod of Wales had been held with free entry.

Because of the COVID-19 pandemic it was the first time an Urdd Eisteddfod had been held since the Cardiff and Vale Urdd National Eisteddfod in 2019.

118,000 visitors attended the event during the week.

== Background ==
The Urdd National Eisteddfod of Wales is the largest youth festival in Europe and had been held every year since 1929 (except 1941–45), organised by the Urdd Gobaith Cymru. The festival gives an opportunity for school children and young people to compete in a variety of events, celebrating Welsh culture and the Welsh language, covering all aspects of the school curriculum. Modern day competitions include literature, poetry, dancing and all forms of music. The Urdd Eisteddfod normally takes place to coincide with the half term school holiday, around the beginning of June.

This would be the fifth time the Urdd Eisteddfod had visited the Vale of Clwyd and the first time it had been to Denbighshire since 2006. An initial meeting took place in June 2020 to discuss inviting the Urdd Eisteddfod back to the county. Originally scheduled to take place in May 2020, the Denbighshire Urdd Eisteddfod was postponed because of the COVID-19 pandemic restrictions. An online 'Eisteddfod T' was held in its place during the Urdd Eisteddfod week and again in 2021.

With the 2022 Urdd Eisteddfod celebrating 100 years of the Urdd organisation, the Welsh Government gave £527,000 to ensure admission to the festival would be free to everyone.

== Proclamation ==
The proclamation of the Denbighshire Urdd Eisteddfod took place in Prestatyn on 5 October 2019 with the expectation the eisteddfod would take place the following year. A parade took place from Prestatyn High School, led by the Cambria Band along the High Street and ending in Bastion Gardens, where 2,000 people enjoyed a day of music and dance performances.

== 2022 location and facilities ==
The main Eisteddfod events took place on the Maes located on fields of Kilford Farm on Whitchurch Road near Denbigh. With the nearest railway station being at Rhyl, access to the site was by car or public transport bus service, or the free shuttle bus from Denbigh financed by Denbighshire County Council.

In a complete change to previous Urdd Eisteddfods, at the 2022 event there were three pavilions and a number of stages allowing every competitor to perform to an audience, rather than potentially being eliminated in preliminary rounds behind closed doors. The green pavilion staged group competitions, the white pavilion staged instrumentalists and the red pavilion staged solo competitors. Nation.Cymru described the Cornel Canlyniadau (Results Corner) podium, where winners were announced in front of the crowds and TV cameras, as "practically the Hunger Games, but with harps instead of crossbows".

== Notable awards and competitions ==
There were 70,530 competitors registered for the 2022 Urdd Eisteddfod.

The Urdd Eisteddfod Crown and Chair were revealed at an event in Denbigh Library on 16 May. The Crown had been designed by jeweller Ann Catrin Evans, who had redesigned it because of the two year postponement of the festival, so that it marked the centenary. The Chair had been made by Rhodri Owen, including 100 marks around the chair and a bottom panel in the form of the local hills.

- 12-year-old Shuchen Xie, from Cardiff, won the Composer prize for her composition for string quartet called Rhapsody in G minor. She was the Urdd Eisteddfod's youngest ever winner for a main prize. She was presented with the Grace Williams Memorial Medal on the first day of the eisteddfod.
- The 2022 Urdd Eisteddfod chair was won by Ciarán Eynon, who had been a school student in Penrhyn Bay before graduating with an MA at Cardiff University. He won the prize for his free verse poetry on the theme of 'Thank you', where Eynon explored his sexuality and his view that the Welsh language has an inability to express it.
- The 2022 Urdd Eisteddfod crown, for the chief prose writer out of a total of 7 entries, was won by Twm Ebbsworth from Ceredigion. He was a postgraduate student in Aberystwyth. Submitting under the pen name of Pysgodyn Aur (Goldfish) he won for his piece of prose over 2,500 words on the theme Llen/Llenni (Cover/Covers).

== See also ==
- 2022 Ceredigion National Eisteddfod
- 2025 Margam Park Urdd National Eisteddfod
