= Tegwen Bruce-Deans =

Welsh writer

- Born: 2000 (age 25–26); London, England
- Education: Bangor University
- Occupation: Writer
- Writing career
- Period: 2023–present
- Notable awards: Urdd Eisteddfod Chair (2023) and Crown (2024)

Tegwen Bruce-Deans (born 2000) is a Welsh writer writing primarily in the Welsh language. She is one of only two people to have won both the Urdd Eisteddfod Crown and Chair.

== Early life and education ==
Bruce-Deans was born in London, England and moved with her family to the Welsh town of Llandrindod Wells when she was two years old. Born into an English-speaking family who lived in the Lewisham area of London, she learnt Welsh after moving to Wales and being enrolled in Welsh-medium education by her parents. Bruce-Deans attended Cylch Meithin Llandrindod, Ysgol Trefonnen and Builth Wells High School, and graduated from Bangor University in 2022. Her dissertation at Bangor focused on the Welsh literary canon's underrepresentation of women writers.

== Career ==
In 2023, Bruce-Deans published Gwawrio, a collection of poems that explore themes such as feminism, self-love and modern life in Wales. The collection was her first solo publication, and was released as part of publisher Cyhoeddiaday Barddas' Tonfedd Heddiw series celebrating new voices in Welsh poetry.

Under the pen name 'Gwawr', Bruce-Deans won the Chair (awarded for poetry) at the Urdd Eisteddfod held in Llandovery, Carmarthenshire, in 2023. Her winning poetry sequence was titled 'Rhwng Dau Le' ('Between Two Places'), and was on the theme of 'river'. The following year, she was awarded the Crown (for prose) at the Urdd Eisteddfod held in Meifod, Powys. Her crowning in 2024 made her only the second ever person to achieve the 'double win' of Crown and Chair at an Urdd Eisteddfod (the first being Iestyn Tyne for his wins in 2016 and 2019).

Bruce-Deans cites writers Mererid Hopwood and Ocean Vuong as inspirations for her work. In 2024, she was one of five poets chosen to take part in the inaugural Pencerdd programme, which offers an opportunity to develop work in the ancient tradition of cynganeddu.

== Personal life ==
Alongside her writing, Bruce-Deans works as a researcher at BBC Radio Cymru. She currently lives in Bangor.

== Bibliography ==
- Gwawrio (2023)
