= Gwenno Mair Davies =

Gwenno Mair Davies (born c. 1983) is a Welsh writer, translator and teacher who won the Crown at the Urdd National Eisteddfod on two occasions.

== Early life ==
Davies is from Llansannan, north Wales. She went to school at Ysgol Bro Aled and Ysgol y Creuddyn in Penrhyn Bay. She graduated in Welsh and Drama from Aberystwyth University in 2004.

== Writing ==
Davies first won the Urdd Crown following the 2005 Cardiff Urdd National Eisteddfod. The prize had been initially presented to Llinos Dafydd on 3 June, but a complaint about plagiarism was made a few days later. Dafydd handed back the Crown and, instead, it was presented to the second-placed Davies at a ceremony in Caernarfon on 17 June. In a revised adjudication the judges said "She held our attention with her imagination and originality. She is without doubt worthy of this year's crown."

Davies followed this up by winning the Crown again at the 2006 Urdd National Eisteddfod, held in Ruthin. Submitting under the pen name of Rhywun Arall ('Someone Else'), her work was on the subject Perthyn ('Belonging'). The work was about a victim of domestic violence, inspired after a period working in social services.

Davies was chosen to write the play, Talaith y Gogledd, one of three talaith ('province') plays to be performed by the Urdd's national youth theatre company across Wales in 2008 and 2009.

She was one of the three writers of the children's book series, Cyfres Halibalŵ, which was funded by the Welsh Government and launched in November 2018.

== Teaching ==
Initially a drama and media studies teacher at Ysgol Gyfun Ystalyfera in Swansea, Davies later worked at Ysgol y Creuddyn (where she had attended as a pupil) in north Wales before becoming deputy head teacher in 2020, subsequently becoming head teacher.
