= Crown of the Urdd National Eisteddfod =

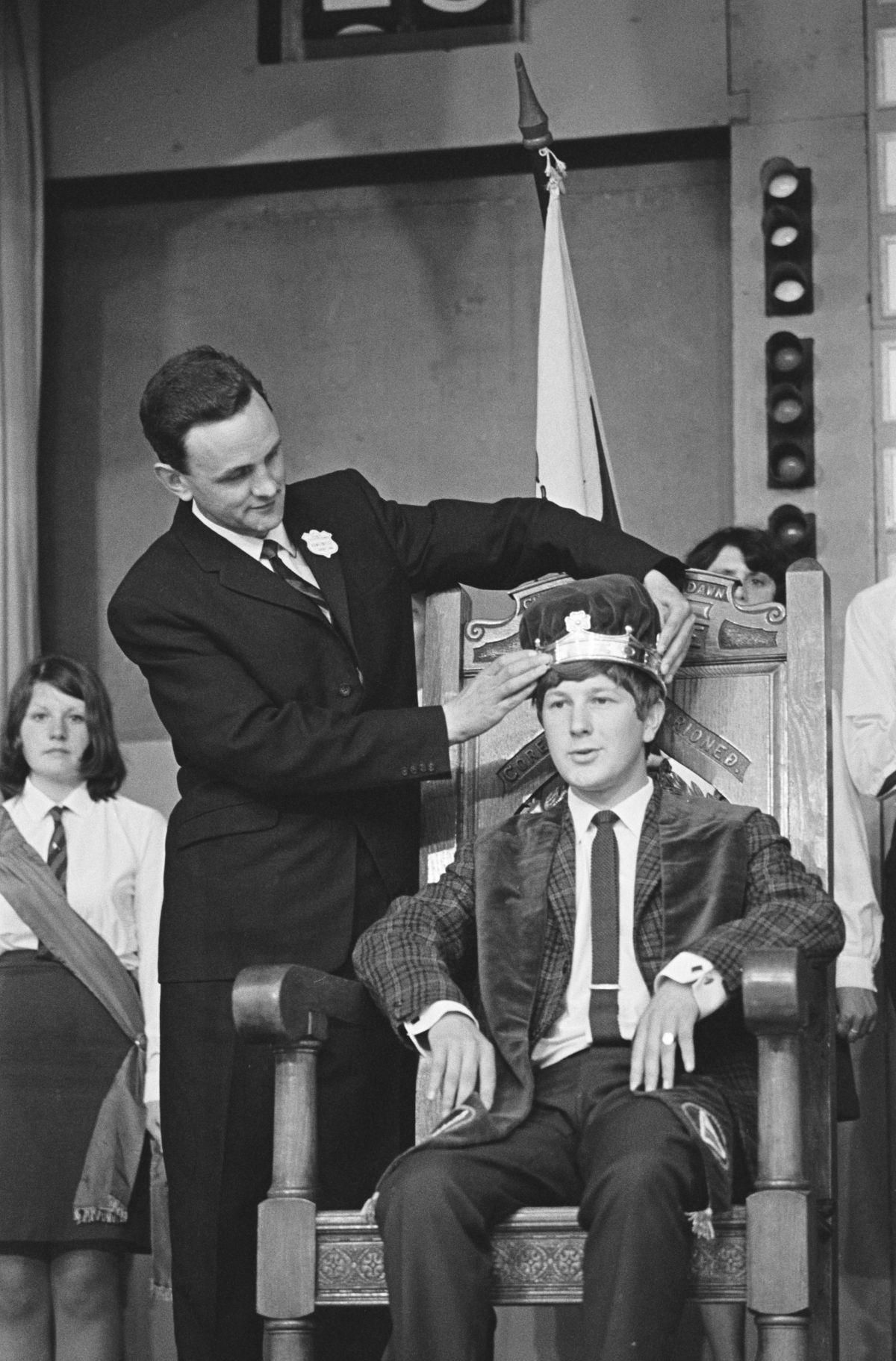
Crowning ceremony at the 1968 Urdd National Eisteddfod

The Crown (Welsh: Coron Eisteddfod Genedlaethol yr Urdd) is one of the main awards presented at the Urdd National Eisteddfod, the annual Welsh-language youth festival and counterpart to the National Eisteddfod of Wales.

The Crown is generally awarded for the best submitted piece or pieces of prose literature of more than 4,000 words or sometimes 2,500 words.

A unique crown is designed and created each year, normally reflecting aspects of the location of the Urdd Eisteddfod in its design, symbolism or materials. Winners had generally been allowed to keep a small replica of the Urdd Crown but, since 2011, have been allowed to permanently keep the original.

The first Urdd Eisteddfod Crown was awarded in 1931, won by Rhiannon Collins from Tumble, near Llanelli, Carmarthenshire. The 1931 crown was discovered, still with its velvet presentation box, for sale in a second-hand shop in Swansea in 2007. It was restored and given to the Llanelli Welsh-medium secondary school, Ysgol Gyfun y Strade, who suggested they would use it to wear at their school eisteddfods. The 1931 Crown was on the stage for the crowning ceremony at the 2007 Urdd National Eisteddfod in Carmarthen.

At the 2005 Urdd Eisteddfod in Cardiff the Crown was initially awarded to trainee journalist, Llinos Dafydd, for a controversial work that included dialogue with a paedophile and a prostitute, and a section about bribing the Eisteddfod judges. However, a complaint was made a few days later that she had used an extract from someone else's work without acknowledgment. Dafydd pointed out two other instances in her work, saying she had been "negligent and careless". She relinquished the prize in favour of the writer who had been placed second. Gwenno Mair Davies, a drama and media studies teacher, was presented with the Crown at a ceremony in Caernarfon later that month.

In 2018 the winner, 20-year-old Sioned Erin Hughes was too ill to attend the crowning ceremony because of a rare medical condition. The crown was placed on the chair in her absence and her college lecturer accepted the award on her behalf.

In 2026 19-year-old Elin Undeg Williams won the Crown, marking an unprecedented run of three female winners in a row.

== Recent winners of the Urdd Crown ==
Year	Location	Winner	Pen-name	Subject	No. of entrants
2026	Anglesey	Elin Undeg Williams		Lloches (Shelter)	14
2025	Margam Park	Mali Elwy		Toddi / Ymdoddi (Melting)	17
2024	Meifod	Tegwen Bruce-Deans		Gwawrio (Dawning)	19
2023	Llandovery	Owain Williams		Hadau (Seeds)	
2022	Denbigh	Twm Ebbsworth	Pysgodyn Aur	Llen/Llenni (Cover/Covers)	7
2021	Virtually (Eisteddfod T)	Megan Angharad Hunter	Lina	Mwgwd/Mygydau (Mask/Masks)	
2020	Postponed due to COVID-19	–	–	–	
2019	Cardiff Bay	Brennig Davies	Fleur De Taf		
2018	Builth Wells	Sioned Erin Hughes		Terfysgaeth (Terrorism)	
2017	Pencoed (Bridgend)	Elen Gwenllian Hughes		Rhyddid (Freedom)	17
2016	Flint	Iestyn Tyne		Gorwelion (Horizons)	14
2015	Caerphilly	Dylan Edwards	Didion 1967	Bradychiad (Betrayal)	
2014	Bala (Merionydd)	Llio Elain Maddocks	Llongau Bach	Pellter (Distance)	17
2013	Boncath (Pembrokeshire)	Guto Dafydd	Yelizaveta	Dwylo (Hands)	15
2012	Glynllifon	Anni Llyn		Egin (To sprout/bud)	
2011	Swansea	Llŷr Titus	Gwern	Ffiniau (Boundaries)	
2010	Llanerchaeron	Catrin Haf Jones			
2009	Cardiff Bay	Lleucu Hughes			
2008	Conwy	Dewi Huw Owen		Gwerth (Value)	
2007	Carmarthen	Rhiannon Marks		Dod yn ôl (Coming back)	10
2006	Ruthin (Denbighshire)	Gwenno Mair Davies	Rhywun Arall	Perthyn (Belonging)	17
2005	Cardiff Bay	Gwenno Mair Davies (Note: Initially awarded to Llinos Dafydd, who later gave up the prize)		Adnabod (Recognize)	

== See also ==
- Chair of the Urdd National Eisteddfod
- Crowning of the Bard
