= 2019 Cardiff and Vale Urdd National Eisteddfod =

2019 Welsh-language youth festival

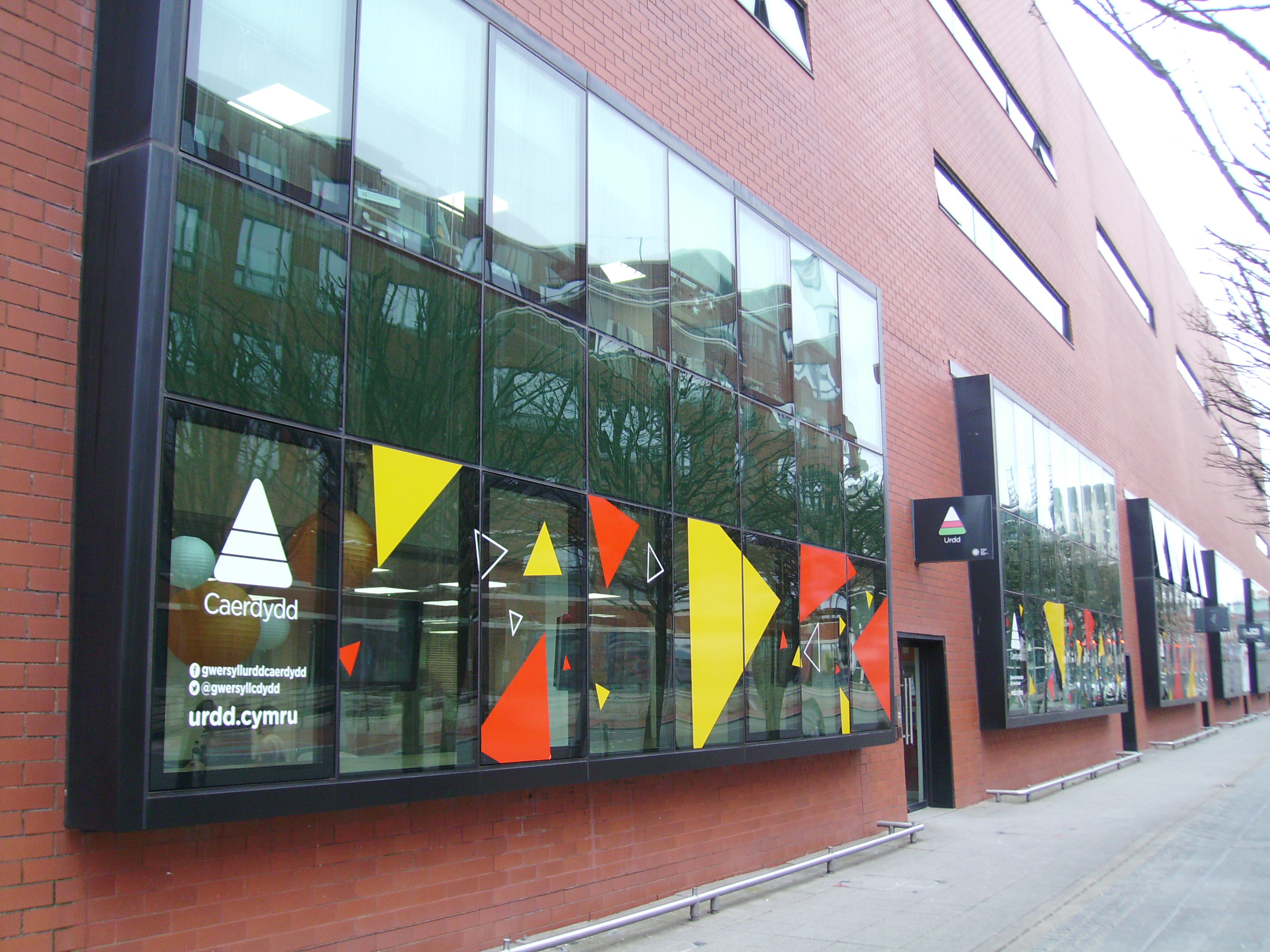
- Urdd residential centre at the Wales Millennium Centre, Cardiff
- Native name: Eisteddfod Genedlaethol yr Urdd, Caerdydd a'r Fro 2019
- Date: 27 May – 1 June 2019
- Duration: 6 days
- Location: Cardiff Bay, Cardiff, Wales; 51°27′50″N 3°9′51″W
- Theme: Welsh language youth culture

The 2019 Cardiff and Vale Urdd National Eisteddfod (Welsh: Eisteddfod Genedlaethol yr Urdd, Caerdydd a'r Fro 2019) was held in Cardiff Bay, Cardiff, Wales, from 27 May to 1 June 2019. This was the first time the Urdd National Eisteddfod of Wales had been held with free entry and without fences.

70,530 competitors registered for events at the 2019 Urdd National Eisteddfod.

Because of the COVID-19 pandemic the next Urdd Eisteddfod did not take place until 2022.

== Background ==
The Urdd National Eisteddfod of Wales is the largest youth festival in Europe and had been held every year (except 1941-45) since 1929, organised by the Urdd Gobaith Cymru. The festival gives an opportunity for school children and young people to compete in a variety of events, celebrating Welsh culture and the Welsh language, covering all aspects of the school curriculum. Modern day competitions include singing and dancing, as well as art, cooking and hairdressing. The Urdd Eisteddfod normally takes place to coincide with the half term school holiday, around the beginning of June.

Similarly to the senior National Eisteddfod of Wales, two of the showpiece events of the Urdd National Eisteddfod are the presentations of the Crown and the Chair.

The Urdd Gobaith Cymru announced the location of the 2019 Urdd National Eisteddfod in June 2016. It meant the Urdd Eisteddfod would be held in South Wales fore three years in a row, in 2017, 2018 and 2019. The event had previously been held in Cardiff Bay in 2005 and 2009. The Urdd had an option to hold the event every four years in Cardiff Bay, but said they had not been back for ten years because there were far more landowners and stakeholders to negotiate with.

In December 2018 the Urdd announced that admission to the 2019 Eisteddfod would be free, including admission to the main pavilion for all under-18s and competitors.

== Proclamation ==
The proclamation of the Cardiff and Vale Urdd Eisteddfod took place on Barry Island in the Vale of Glamorgan on 6 October 2018. Students from local schools and colleges were invited to take part in a procession along the beach front led by a samba band, culminating in free music and entertainment. Participants were encouraged to wear the Urdd colours of red, white and green.

== 2019 location and facilities ==
The main Eisteddfod events took place on the Maes located around Roald Dahl Plass in Cardiff Bay. The main 'pavilion' competitions took place in the nearby Wales Millennium Centre (WMC). Other fixtures on the Maes included over 80 stalls promoting organisations or selling products, a climbing wall and live music. Entry to the Maes was free, though non-competitors or over-18s had to buy a day ticket for £13 to enter the WMC.

The Senedd building was used for the Art, Design and Technology exhibitions, with an opening ceremony on 27 May. The recently created Welsh Youth Parliament were also based in the Senedd building, publicising themselves, gathering opinions and taking part in an event with the Children's Commissioner for Wales.

The GwyddonLe (Science Pavilion) in the Bay area was sponsored by Swansea University who also launched their new research ship, RV Mary Anning, on the first day of the festival. It was moored in Cardiff Bay and open for visits.

The Pierhead Building became the Welsh Learners' Pavilion.

== Notable competitions and awards ==
- The 2019 Chair, awarded for a piece of poetry in strict metre or free verse, was made by Iolo Puw using a wind-fallen oak tree from near the Urdd Centre at Llanuwchllyn. The chair was won by 21-year-old Iestyn Tyne from Caernarfon, chosen out of 15 competitors for his seven pieces of cynghanedd poetry about shame.
- The 2019 Crown, awarded for a piece of literature over 4,000 words, was created by Iolo Edger using solid sterling silver. It was won by Brennig Davies, a first-year student at Oxford University and former pupil of Ysgol Gymraeg Bro Morgannwg in the Vale of Glamorgan.
- The first major prize of the eisteddfod was the composer's medal, awarded on Monday 27 May. It went to 20-year-old Siriol Jenkins from Wiseman's Bridge in Pembrokeshire, though she couldn't collect the award because she was sitting her final exams at Oxford University. Another of her compositions won second prize.
- The art medal was awarded on 27 May to A-Level student, Seren Wyn Jenkins, from Aberystwyth. She had created a table on the theme of Wales, using materials from Wales such as wood from Aberystwyth and copper from Anglesey. Ffion Pritchard from Bangor won the £2000 art scholarship.

== See also ==
- 2018 Cardiff National Eisteddfod
