= Gruffudd Antur =

Gruffudd Antur (born c. 1992) is a Welsh poet, academic and author, who won the Chair at the Urdd National Eisteddfod twice, in 2012 and 2014.

== Early life ==
Antur comes from Llanuwchllyn, Gwynedd. He graduated in Physics at Aberystwyth University but then switched to Welsh, gaining an MA and PhD in Welsh Literature at Bangor University.

== Poetry ==
Antur learnt to write cynghanedd verse in year seven at school, taking lessons from Huw Dylan Jones and Elwyn Edwards. He entered eisteddfod competitions as a teenager, winning the Chair at the Inter-collegiate eisteddfods in 2011 and 2012. He was also a chaired poet at the Llanuwchlyn Eisteddfod in 2011.

He entered the poetry competition at the 2010 Urdd National Eisteddfod, coming second. At the 2012 Urdd National Eisteddfod he won the Bardic Chair for a piece of cynghanedd poetry inspired by a Saunders Lewis speech and describing the Welsh-speaking student community in Aberystwyth.

At the 2014 Urdd Eisteddfod at Llanuwchllyn, Antur won the Chair for a second time, though admitted he was encouraged to enter again because he only lived six miles away. There were 14 candidates and the aim was to write a poe on the theme of Pelydrau ('Rays'). Antur wrote under the pseudonym of Gwenno. The judges described the standard of his winning entry as "consistently high from the start to finish".

== Career ==
Antur started his academic career as a Research Assistant at the Centre for Advanced Welsh and Celtic Studies in Aberystwyth.

Antur has adapted and translated several of David Walliams' best selling childrens books into Welsh. These included Cyfrinach Nana Crwca (Gangsta Granny), Deintydd Dieflig (Demon Dentist) and Yr Hipo Cyntaf ar y Lleuad (First Hippo on the Moon). In 2017 the audio version of Cyfrinach Nana Crwca won the Bronze Radio Award.
