= Urdd Peace and Goodwill Message =

The Urdd Peace and Goodwill Message has been relayed each year without fail since 28 June 1922. It is a message of peace and goodwill from the young people of Wales that is sent to the children and young people of the world on Goodwill Day, which is May 18. The message theme, authorship and broadcast is organised by Urdd Gobaith Cymru (lit. "Wales's League of Hope", commonly translated to the Welsh League of Youth) which is a Welsh language youth organisation also established in 1922.

The message is developed as a response to current events, and over the years numerous responses have been received from other countries. The process of writing and sending the message on behalf of the young people of Wales to young people around the world aims to inspire humanitarian and international activity. In 1955 Urdd Gobaith Cymru assumed responsibility for ensuring the message is written and distributed every year.

In 2019 the message was launched outside of Wales for the first time, taking young people from Wales on a visit to an academy working with young people from disadvantaged backgrounds in London – the Eastside Young Leaders Academy.

In 2020 the message theme was changed from Empowering Girls to Stop the Clock and Start Again "2020 theme change: in order to properly reflect the feelings of the young people of Wales, the Message theme this year has been changed as they try and make sense of the world during the COVID-19 pandemic. It will be a letter to the world, and especially to leaders, calling on us not to return to the old destructive ways of living".

The message is written by young people for young people.

== History ==
The idea of sending a "Message of Goodwill" was first suggested by the Rev. Gwilym Davies MA at the 'Adolescent Conference of the Welsh School of Social Service' which was held in Llandrindod Wells at Whitsun 1922. Davies was an Honorary Director of the League of Nations in Wales and he suggested that the message should be created by school pupils "in all 13 counties of Wales and Monmouthshire" (there was ambiguity at the time whether Monmouthshire was a constitutional part of Wales), it is said that "the suggestions was adopted with enthusiasm". The work of receiving suggestions from schools began and Davies was to organise the broadcast.

The Peace and Goodwill Message is shared on 18 May, the date of the first peace conference at the Hague in 1899. The first Peace and Goodwill Message was sent in Morse Code via the Post Office on June 28, 1922, by the Rev Gwilym Davies, Cwm Rhymni (Rhymney Valley). It has been sent without fail since that date. In 1922, the director of the radio station on the Eiffel Tower in Paris responded by sending it on from the Eiffel Tower in Morse Code. In 1924, a response was received from the Archbishop of Uppsala in Sweden and also from the education minister in Poland. The message was broadcast on the BBC World Service for the first time in 1924, and it is now translated into over 40 languages and is distributed via the web.

=== Early responses ===
The first responses to the Goodwill Message were received in 1924, including one from the Archbishop of Uppsala in Sweden, Poland’s Education Minister, Millaszewski [sic.]. A request was made once again in 1925 for responses to the message to be sent to the Rev. D.M.Davies at the offices of the League of Nations in Wales, 10 Richmond Terr, Park Place, Cardiff. Responses were received from, amongst others Léon Bourgeois (a French leader and a left-leaning thinker), Paul Hymans (a Belgian liberal politician and the second General Secretary for the League of Nations) and Sir Eric Drummond, General Secretary for the League of Nations and the Education Ministers of Czechoslovakia and Finland. Perhaps unexpectedly a response was also received from "Signior Mussolini", the fascist leader of Italy. In 1925 the first response from the USA was received from Public School 6, Manhattan, New York, and an article about the initiative was printed in the December 1925 edition of the children’s American magazine, Everyland. 736 responses to the Peace and Goodwill Message in 1938. 124 came from the United States, and 304 from Romania.

The responsibility for publishing the annual message was transferred to Urdd Gobaith Cymru in the 1950s. Today it is written each year by members of the Urdd’s Bwrdd Syr IfanC and Cymraeg Bob Dydd.

== International messages ==
No response was received to the first message in 1922, despite the Eiffel Tower radio station director sending it on. Within ten years 68 countries had responded to the message. These are records of the concerns of young people in Wales, and a comprehensive collection of the responses are available in the National Library of Wales collection.

Over the decades, posters have been produced alongside the message, which is on a different theme each year. The messages are usually translated into the Celtic languages, the main European languages and a number of other world languages, large and small, including Esperanto. Part of the tradition of the messages is that children from countries around the world respond to the message from Wales, often in the form of letters and drawings. Today responses are received mostly via email or images and videos which have been share on social media.

The latest messages, including a video created for the first time in 2018, can be seen on the Urdd website.

Education packs are created annually for teachers and pupils to use, along with posters featuring the messages in various languages.

Here are some responses from abroad to the messages shared internationally in the past:

- 1946 - Germany: "It is years since we have heard from the Welsh Children. How it grew dark! We should like to hear from you again."
- 1948 - Japan: "We are really happy to know, after so many years of isolation, that you have sent so hearty words of friendship and love."
- 1958 - Argentina: "Hope is placed upon the youth of the world, and we alongside you, want to realise these hopes."
- 1972 – Czech Republic: "We must join together to oppose the power of the larger nations who wish to rid the world of all ‘silly and nonsensically small’ languages, cultures and nations."

== Themes of the messages ==
The first message was sent in 1922 and, according to a copy of the leaflet in 1925 it seems like the same message was sent in 1923, 1924 and 1925.

The Welsh used reads: "Cenadwri Plant Cymru at Blant yr Holl Fyd trwy gyfrwng y Pellebr Diwifr." ("Tywysogaeth Cymru a Mynwy") ("Tidings from Welsh Children to the Children of the whole world by Wireless Telegraph." ("The Principality of Wales and Monmouthshire"). Themes: God’s Blessings, all countries and nations, end all the old arguments, the Treaty of the Union of Nations, a friend to all mothers.

Quote: "Yna ni bydd raid i neb ohonom, pan awn yn hŷn, ddangos ein cariad tuag at wlad ein genedigaeth trwy gashau a lladd y naill y llall." ("So that none of us shall, as we get holder, be required to demonstrate our love towards our Country of birth through hate and killing each other.")

=== Example of themes ===
Some annual messages have had an individual theme, some have been repeats. Some themes reflect the situation and political environment in Wales and the world at that time. For example:

- 2020 - Empowering Girls was the planned theme (announced 2020-02-01), then was changed due to COVID-19 to Stop the Clock and Start Again.
- 2019 - Voice Urdd Gobaith Cymru (2019-05-16), Neges Heddwch ac Ewyllys Da 2019 (Welsh subtitles), – raising our voice to stand with the children and young people of the world who suffer from violence – knife violence, gun violence and violence through war. The message was created in the form of a video and a poster. According to the Urdd's own website the message reached over 5.2 million people around the world through #Heddwch2019 on social media. Videos were received via social media from the Hollywood actor Matthew Rhys, Sadiq Khan (Mayor of London), Eluned Morgan AM and Liz Saville Roberts MP as well as from schools, individuals, groups and organisations. A video response was created by Urdd members in Anglesey, in partnership with Menter Iaith Mon, Multi-Tool Media and Ysgol Uwchradd Bodedern.
- 2018 - Hope Urdd Gobaith Cymru (2018-05-17), Neges Heddwch ac Ewyllys Da 2018, adalwyd 2019-07-11] – created by young people from Mid Glamorgan in the form of a video as well as a poster for the first time ever.
- 2015 – A better Wales by using the metaphor of the Mimosa, the ship which sailed to create a new Wales in Patagonia, Argentina.
- 2011 – theme was Afghanistan due to the war there, which involved British troops.
- 2010 – the threat from climate change to the world and the need to act quickly.
- 1998 – Ethiopian drought.
- 1986 – Wales as a nuclear free country.
- 1970 – A very modernist cover and inside the magazine a list of sponsors who supported the initiative which included Welsh schools and individuals from organisations in Wales and abroad.
- 1969 – the cover featured Dr. Martin Luther King, who was murdered the previous year. The message was, "We can hope for a world where one nation will not have to suffer the tyranny of another nation, and where love for one’s fellow man can be prominent in place of war, love instead of hate, and justice instead of violence." The booklet also includes an overview of the first 45 years of the message.
- 1939 – a repeat of the message in 1938, "The world more in need, today than ever, of what nobody but ourselves can give, which is the confidence and friendship of youth."
- 1933 – the cover featured an image of children from countries and nations around the world, holding hands in their traditional national dress and dancing around the world, with a girl in the Welsh dress placed most prominently.
- 1932 – a 16 page leaflet was produced with the first image on the cover – a photograph of a young boy on the radio and the slogan "it’s working!" and the Peace and Goodwill Message: "The Welsh Youth’s Radio Message to the World." Themes: radio, "the world is now akin to one big village as we have been brought within hearing range of each other", pioneers, "for those who gave words wings to fly from continent to continent. They were the heroes of faith and vision to make our world a community." Inside the Message leaflet that year was outline information about those who developed the technology of radio broadcasting and also a selection of international responses to previous messages including from countries as diverse as "Siska" in Yugoslavia (possibly Šiška which is now part of Ljubljana in Slovenia), Latvia and provinces such as Nova Scotia, Transvaal. A heartbreakingly ironic message is included from Emma Finck, a teacher representing her school in Hamburg, Germany, who says "I am convinced that the Welsh children's World Wireless Message will help us to save the world and to strengthen the confidence between the nations". An abridged version of the message is included in the leaflet in Welsh, English, French, German, Spanish, Italian and Esperanto.
- 1925 – A message of peace following the mission of the League of Nations, it appears that it was the same message used in 1922 up to at least 1927 as it was broadcast on the radio.
