= Iestyn Tyne =

Welsh poet and musician (born 1997)

- Born: 3 July 1997 (age 29); Bardsey Island, Wales
- Education: Aberystwyth University
- Occupation: Writer
- Writing career
- Period: 2016–present
- Notable awards: Urdd Eisteddfod Crown (2016) and Chair (2019)

Iestyn Tyne (born 3 July 1997) is a Welsh poet, writer, musician, editor and translator. He was the first person to win both the Urdd Eisteddfod Crown (2016) and Chair (2019).

== Early life and education ==
Tyne was born on 3 July 1997 on Bardsey Island, where his parents worked as farmers. He was brought up in Boduan on the Llŷn Peninsula, and now lives in Caernarfon with his family. He studied Welsh at Aberystwyth University.

== Career ==
Tyne primarily works in the Welsh language. He is one of the founders and editors of Cyhoeddiadau’r Stamp, an independent publisher focusing on new voices in Welsh-language writing.

In 2016, aged 18 and while in his first year at Aberystwyth University, he won the Crown at the Urdd Eisteddfod for a piece on the theme of ‘horizons’.

Alongside Darren Chetty, Hanan Issa and Grug Muse, Tyne acted as a contributing editor to the essay anthology Welsh (Plural): Essays on the Future of Wales, published by Repeater Books in 2022. In an interview with The Bookseller, he said the intention of the anthology was to create "a space which enabled writers to focus on their dreams and aspirations for Wales."

Tyne is a member of the folk bands Patrobas and Pendevig.

In addition to his own creative output, Tyne also works as a translator. During her tenure as National Poet of Wales, he has worked with Hanan Issa to translate her poetry into Welsh.

== Bibliography ==
=== Poetry ===
- Addunedau (2017)
- Ar adain (2018)
- Cywilydd (2019)

=== As editor ===
- Dweud y Drefn pan nad oes Trefn: Blodeugerdd 2020 (with Grug Muse) (2020)
- Welsh (Plural): Essays on the Future of Wales (with Darren Chetty, Hanan Issa and Grug Muse) (2022)
