= Chairing of the Bard =

Ceremony in the Welsh eisteddfod tradition

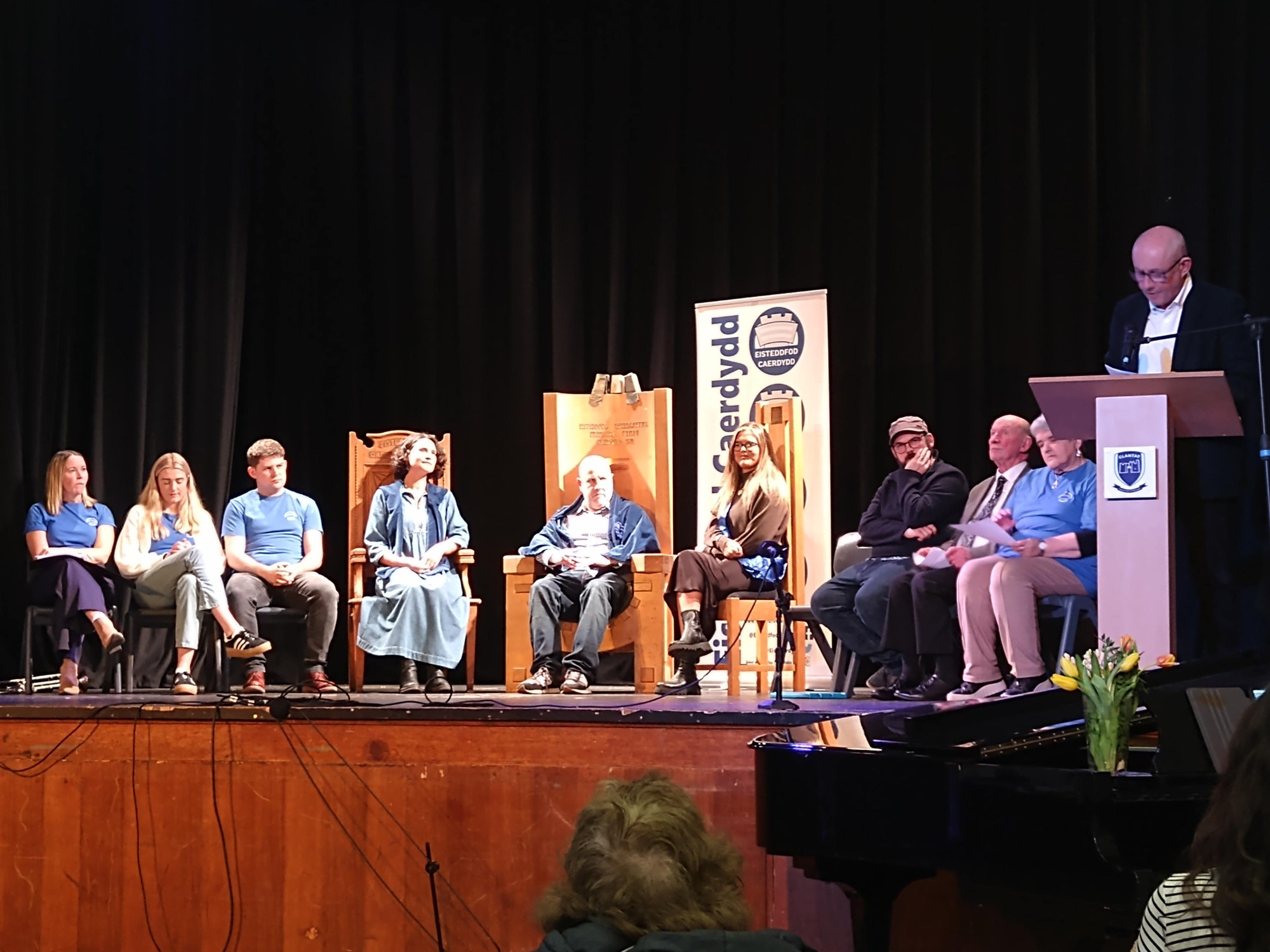
Chairing ceremony at the 2026 Cardiff Eisteddfod

The Chairing of the Bard (Welsh: Cadeirio'r Bardd) is one of the most important events in the Welsh eisteddfod tradition. The word 'eisteddfod' comes from the Welsh word 'eistedd', which means 'to sit'.

At the height of the eisteddfod tradition in the 19th century, up to 450 chairing events took place each year.

== Early chairing tradition ==
At the first recorded 'eisteddfod' in 1176 at Cardigan, Lord Rhys awarded two chairs as prizes, one for the winner of the poetry competition and the other for music. The poetry chair went to a bard from Gwynedd, while the music prize went to the son of Eilon the Crythwr, a member of Rhys's court. Chairs were a valuable asset, normally reserved for people of high status.

In later centuries, at formal eisteddfods or informal 'assemblies of rhymers', chairs continued to be awarded as prizes. The earliest known chair made specifically for an eisteddfod was in 1819 in Carmarthen, with a chair made by prominent Carmarthen craftsman, David Morley.

== National Eisteddfod of Wales ==
The most famous chairing ceremony takes place at the National Eisteddfod of Wales, and is always on the Friday afternoon of Eisteddfod week. Winners are referred to as Y Prifardd (literally "The Chief Bard").

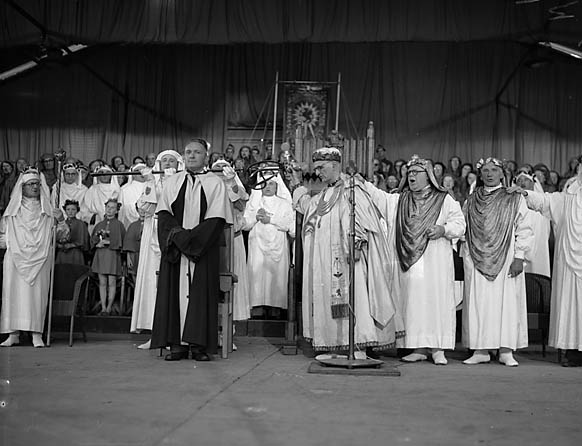
The chairing ceremony of the 1958 National Eisteddfod; the victorious poet was T. Llew Jones

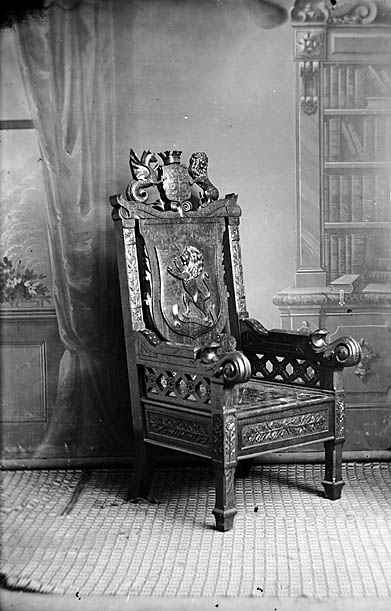
The chair posthumously awarded to Taliesin o Eifion at the Wrexham Eisteddfod in 1876

A new bardic chair is specially designed and made for each eisteddfod and is awarded to the winning entrant in a competition for the "awdl", or for a collection of poems, written in a strict metre form known as cynghanedd. It is possible for the chair to be withheld, if the standard of entries is not considered high enough by the judges.

This was the case in 1889, when a chair made for a minor eisteddfod at Bagillt, in Flintshire, was not awarded. The chair in question made news in 2006, when it was returned to Wales after being acquired by a local Welsh society in Canada. The withholding of the chair happened most recently in 2013 at the Eisteddfod in Denbigh.

Before the Archdruid of the Gorsedd reveals the identity of the winning poet, the Corn Gwlad (a trumpet) blares to the east, west, north, and south to symbolically call the people together from the four corners of Wales. The Gorsedd Prayer is then recited. Flanked by his fellow members of the Gorsedd in ceremonial Neo-Druidic robes, as well as the Herald, the Recorder, and the Swordbearer, the Archdruid partially withdraws the Great Sword from its sheath three times, and asks, "A oes heddwch?" ('Is there peace?'), to which the assembly replies, "Heddwch" ('Peace').

The Great Sword is then driven fully back into its sheath, and is never drawn again until the next eisteddfod the following year. "Green clad elves come dancing in", escorting a young local married woman, who presents the Horn of Plenty to the Archdruid and urges him to drink of the 'wine of welcome'. A young girl presents him with a basket of 'flowers from the land and soil of Wales' and a floral dance is performed, based on a pattern of flower gathering from the fields.

According to historian Jan Morris, "Harps play. Children sing. The tension mounts, for nobody in that immense audience yet knows who is to be the recipient of all this honour. The winning poet is somewhere among them, but first he must be found."

The Archdruid then asks one of the judges to comment on the winning entry and explain the reasons why it was chosen. After the judge does so, the Archdruid thanks the judge for his or her, "excellent adjudication". The Archdruid then announces that if the poet or writer whose awdl, pryddest, or essay was submitted under a certain pen name is present, then he or she is to stand up.

According to Morris, "the poet has really known for some time that he is the winner, but he pretends a proper astonishment anyway, and is raised faintly resisting to his feet, and out to the aisle, and away up to the platform escorted by Druids. The organ blazes a grand march, the gathering rises to its feet, the cameras whirr, and the bard is throned upon his Bardic throne, attended by elves and trumpeters and druids, in a haze of medallions, oaken wands, gleaming accoutrements and banners talismanically inscribed. Gently he is seated upon the Chair which is itself his prize, and he is proclaimed a champion: not because he won a war or a football game or even an election, but because he is judged by wise men of his nation to have composed a worthy cywydd concerning the nature of clouds."

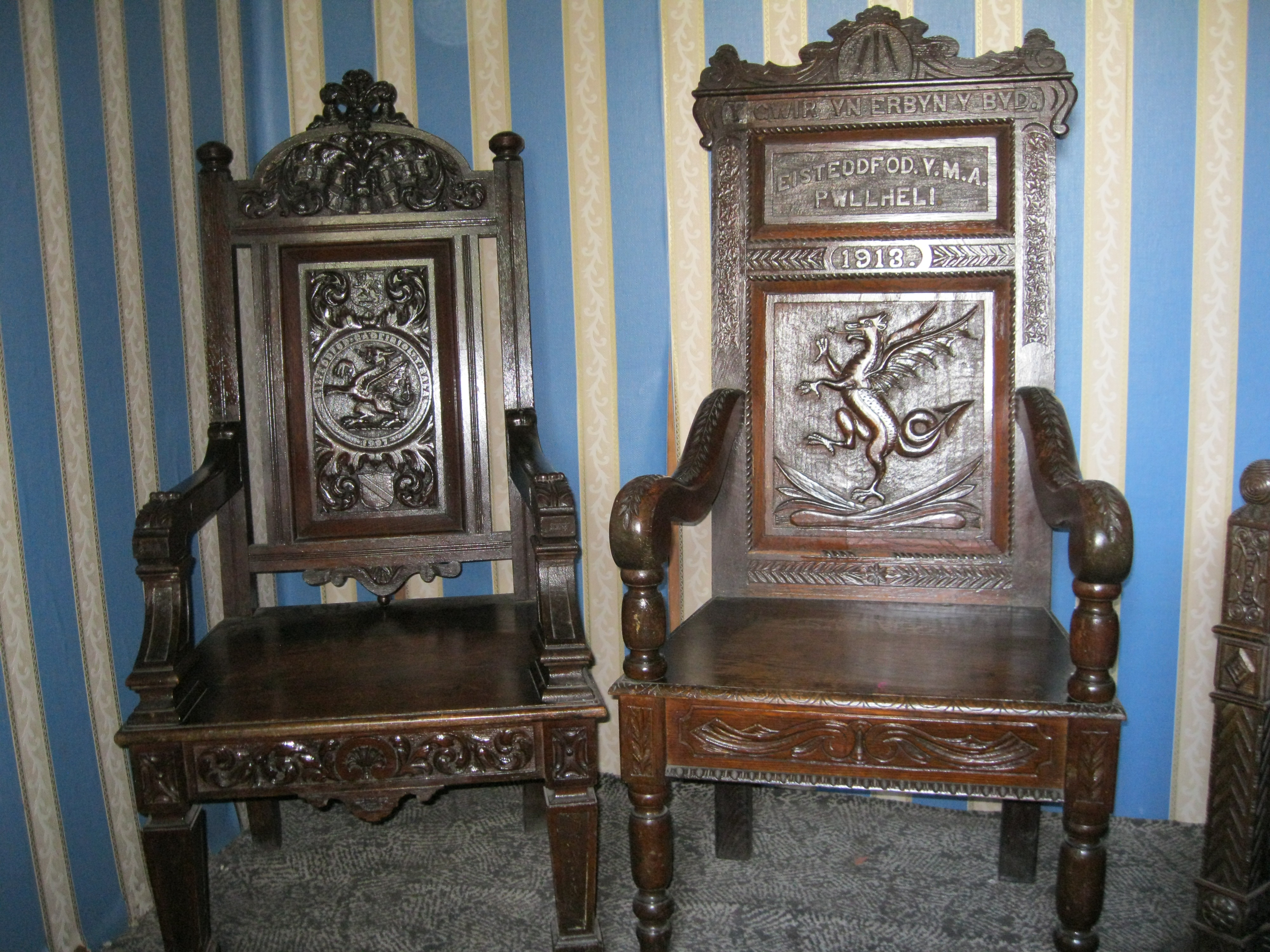
Hedd Wyn's bardic chairs

In 1917, Hedd Wyn (Ellis Humphrey Evans) was awarded the Chair for his ode "Yr Arwr" ("The Hero"). On 6 September 1917, when the ceremony of Chairing of the Bard took place at the National Eisteddfod, held at Birkenhead Park, England, the adjudicators announced that the winning entry had been submitted under the pseudonym Fleur de Lys. After the trumpets had summoned the winner three times to stand forth from the audience, Archdruid Dyfed announced that he had been killed in action six weeks earlier. The winner's chair was then draped in a black sheet, and delivered to Hedd Wyn's parents. That year's eisteddfod is now referred to in the Welsh language as "Eisteddfod y Gadair Ddu" ("The Eisteddfod of the Black Chair").

The chair from that ceremony, which was made by a Belgian carpenter, Eugeen Vanfleteren (1880–1950), who had fled to Britain when Belgium was invaded and had settled in Birkenhead, is on display at Yr Ysgwrn, the poet's former home. Winning the "double" of bardic chair and crown at the same eisteddfod is a feat that has only been performed a handful of times in the history of the eisteddfod. Alan Llwyd and Donald Evans have each performed the double twice. The first woman to win the Chair at the National Eisteddfod was Mererid Hopwood in 2001; she went on to win the crown at a later eisteddfod.

== Urdd National Eisteddfod ==
A junior version of the Chair is awarded at the Urdd National Eisteddfod, for the best poem in strict or free metre. Iestyn Tyne, winner of the Urdd Chair in 2019, became the first person to win both the Chair and the Crown, having won the Urdd Crown in 2016. Elain Roberts won the Chair in 2025, for a poem of 100 lines or less on the subject of 'Sand'. It meant that for the first time the Chair prize had been awarded to female winners for three years in a row. In May 2026, Lois Medi won the Urdd Eisteddfod Chair at the Eisteddfod yr Urdd Ynys Môn (Anglesey), making her the first woman to win the Urdd chair prize twice. She had previously won it in 2024 at the Eisteddfod yr Urdd Maldwyn (Meifod). In 2025 she had also won the Trevelin Eisteddfod Chair at the Porth Madryn Eisteddfod, in Patagonia.

=== Recent winners of the Urdd Chair ===
Year	Location	Winning Poet	Pen name	Poem
2026	Anglesey	Lois Medi		Pont (Bridge)
2025	Margam Park	Elain Roberts		Tywod (Sand)
2024	Meifod	Lois Medi		
2023	Llandovery	Tegwen Bruce-Deans	Gwawr	Rhwng Dau Le (Between Two Places)
2022	Denbigh	Ciarán Eynon		Diolch (Thankyou)
2021	Virtually			
2020	Virtually (Eisteddfod T)			
2019	Cardiff Bay	Iestyn Tyne		Gorwelion (Horizons)
2018	Builth Wells	Osian Owen	Afallon	
2017	Pencoed (Bridgend)	Gwynfor Dafydd		Arwr neu Arwres (Hero or Heroine)
2016	Flint	Gwynfor Dafydd		
2015	Nelson (Caerphilly)	Elis Dafydd		
2014	Merionedd	Gruffudd Antur	Gwenno	Pelydrau (Rays)
2013	Pembrokeshire	Elan Grug Muse		Awelon (Breezes)
2012	Glynllifon	Gruffudd Antur		
2011	Swansea	Llyr Gwyn Lewis		
2010	Llanerchaeron	Llyr Gwyn Lewis		Tonnau (Waves)
2009	Cardiff Bay	No winner		
2008	Conwy district	Iwan Rhys		Colli (Losing)
2007	Carmarthen	Hywel Griffiths		Ffenestr (Window)
2006	Ruthin	Eurig Salisbury (Note: Salisbury also came second in the same competition)		Goleuni (Light)
2005	Cardiff	Aneurin Karadog		Darluniau (Illustrations)
2004	Llangefni	Hywel Griffiths		
2003	Margam Park	Ifan Prys		Dur (Steel)
2002	Cardiff	Ifan Prys		
2001	Gŵyl yr Urdd			
2000	Conwy	Ifan Prys		

== See also ==
- Crowning of the Bard
