= Margam Country Park =

Country park estate in Wales

Margam County Park
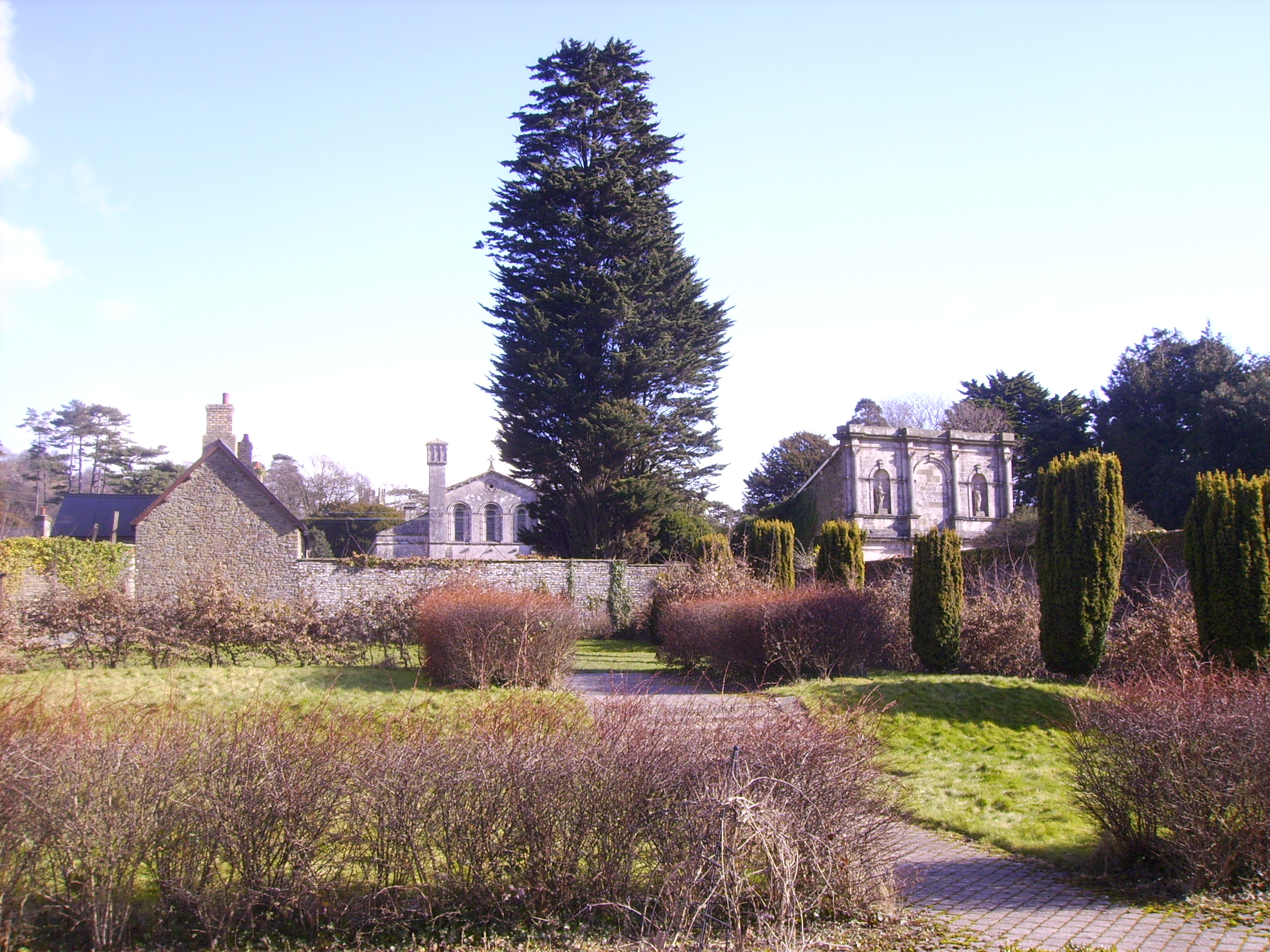
- View from the Orangery Gardens

- Location within Wales
- Interactive map of Margam County Park
- Type: Country park
- Location: Margam, Neath Port Talbot, Wales
- Coordinates: 51°33′46″N 3°43′32″W
- Created: 1977
- Operator: Neath Port Talbot County Borough Council
- Status: Open all year
- Parking: Paid parking
- Website: Official website

Margam Country Park is a country park estate in Wales, of around 850 acres (3.4 km^{2}). It is situated in Margam, about 2 miles (3 km) from Port Talbot in south Wales. It was once owned by the Mansel Talbot family and is now owned and administered by the local council, Neath Port Talbot County Borough Council. Situated within the park are three notable buildings: Margam Abbey, a Cistercian monastery; Margam Castle, a neo-Gothic country house that was once the seat of the Mansel Talbot family; and the 18th-century Orangery. There is also evidence of the largest Roman villa in Wales. The park is designated Grade I on the Cadw/ICOMOS Register of Parks and Gardens of Special Historic Interest in Wales.

== Country park ==
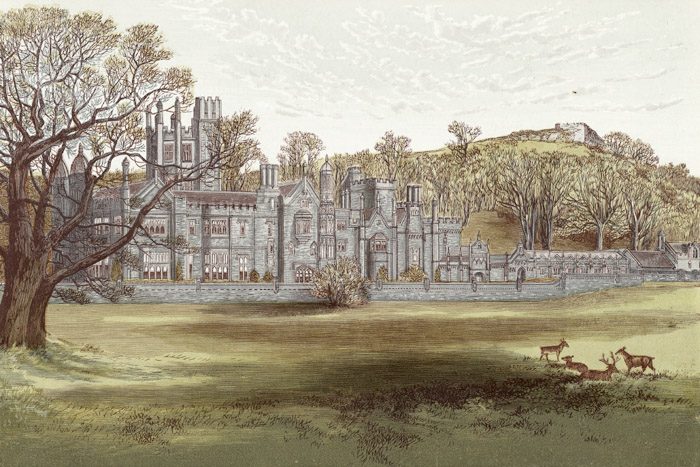
Margam abbey c.1865

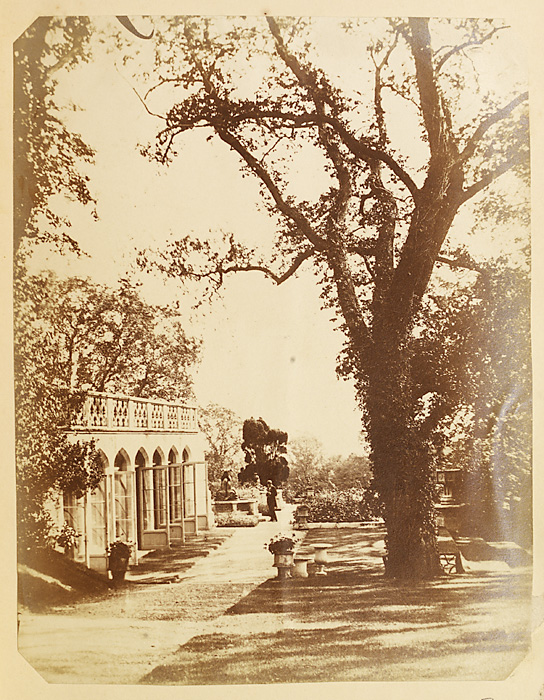
The Orangery, Margam. Photographed in the 1850s

Margam Park owes its location and beginnings to the monastery, which was acquired by Sir Rice Mansel in 1540 after the Dissolution of the Monasteries in 1537. A Tudor mansion was later built on the site of the former monastic ranges by Sir Rice Mansel as a county residence. In 1661, the first mention of a garden is referenced, including walled areas and by 1727 the estate's gardener drew up a catalogue of the plants at the gardens. 1793 saw the completion of the Orangery, the masterpiece of eighteenth-century architect Anthony Keck, and by the late 18th century the gardens were fenced off from the park to keep out the deer, and a main gate was erected. An 1814 estate map shows that a working park had been realised, with a 'Great', 'Little' and 'Upper' Parks, and by 1830 the construction of a new manor house, to become Margam Castle, had begun. Before the end of the decade, plans show the inclusion of several new buildings and features, including the Temple of the Four Seasons, the stone facade and the gardener's cottage.

The Margam Estate was acquired by Glamorgan County Council in July 1973, and the next year, after a Local Government re-organisation, the Park fell under the ownership of West Glamorgan County Council. The park was opened to the public in 1977.

in 1985 a sculpture park was established by the Welsh Sculpture Trust which exhibited work by internationally famous sculptors including Henry Moore, Barbara Hepworth and Elisabeth Frink. The sculpture park has since closed.

The estate is noted for its peacock population. Also on the estate are deer, which have existed on the site since at least Norman times. The majority are fallow deer (numbering around 230); red deer (about 60) and the non-native Père David's deer (about 30) were introduced in the 1990s, the latter as part of a breeding programme. Venison from the management of the deer herd is sold to the public. Aviaries on the estate house a number of rescued birds of prey. The rare breed Glamorgan cattle are raised on the estate.

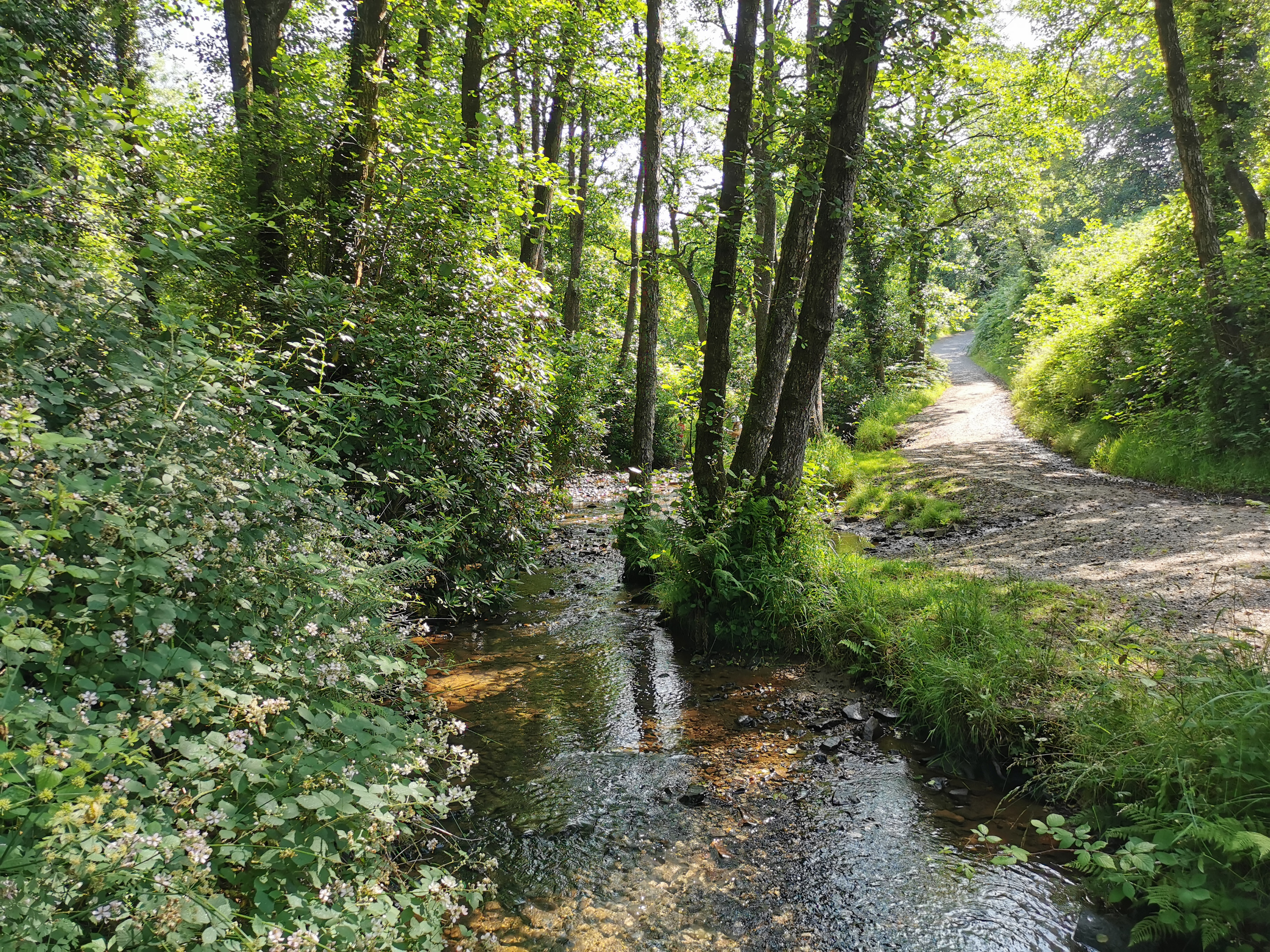
Nant Cwm Philip Stream at the ford crossing in Margam Park

The Coed Morgannwg Way, the Ogwr Ridgeway Walk and the St Illtyd's Walk long-distance paths all begin/finish around Mynydd y Castell within Margam Country Park. An inland section of the Wales Coast Path runs through the park along the escarpment above the motorway, and there are a number of shorter (less than three miles (5 km)) walks waymarked in the park. There are no major rivers in the park, but there are lakes and ponds, and it is possible to fish some of the ponds. Nant Cwm Philip is a 1 2/3 mi (2.7 km) long stream that sits in the Cwm Philip valley and is surrounded by mixed woodland. It feeds into the Margam Park fish pond.

The 2 ft (610 mm) narrow gauge Margam Park Railway conducts visitors around the grounds in the summer. The Orangery has a licence for civil marriages. Events on the estate are held through the summer: ranging from fairs selling particular goods to car rallies. The Margam Country Show is held in August. In 2003, the park was host to the Urdd National Eisteddfod.

In a 2013 the park came first in a national vote to find the public's favourite Green Flag Awarded park from a field of 1,448 qualifying open spaces. The park is designated Grade I on the Cadw/ICOMOS Register of Parks and Gardens of Special Historic Interest in Wales.

Access is free but there is a charge for car parking and for some events. The park has been used for the Wales Rally GB. The park was used as a filming location for two episodes of Doctor Who in 2007 ("The Sontaran Stratagem" and "The Poison Sky"), and in 2023 for the episode "Rogue".

== Scheduled monuments and listed buildings ==
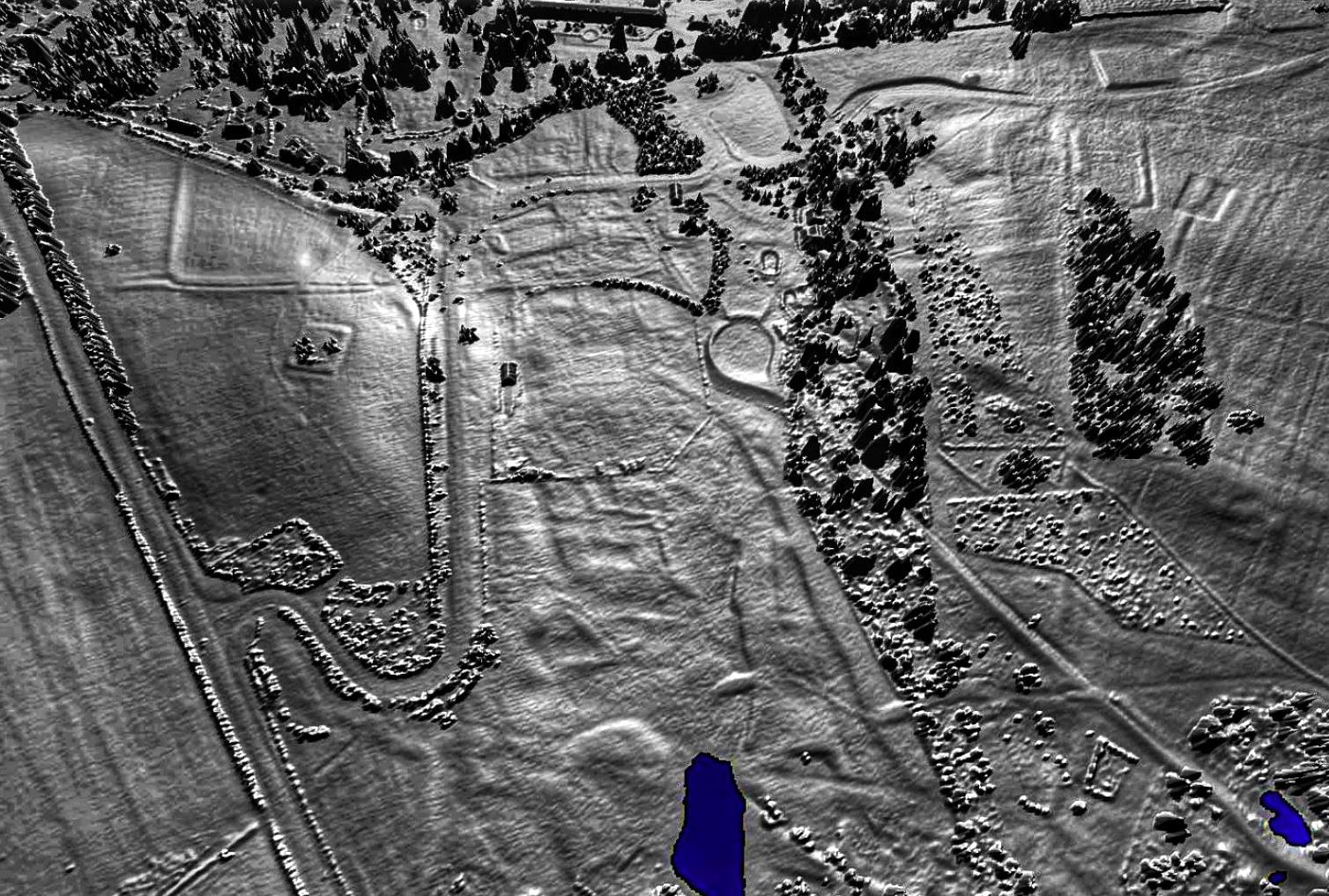
An oblique lidar view of Margam Country Park and associated archaeological residues

The country park has six Scheduled Ancient Monuments and a large number of listed buildings within it. Of the scheduled monuments, two are Iron Age hill forts, two are medieval religious sites, one is a museum and one is a World War II installation. Of the listed buildings, those graded at the highest grade, Grade I, include the abbey itself, and its chapterhouse and undercroft, Margam Castle, the Orangery and the former Banqueting House. (Note: A number of the structures are both scheduled monuments and listed buildings, an example being the abbey.)

=== Iron Age camps ===
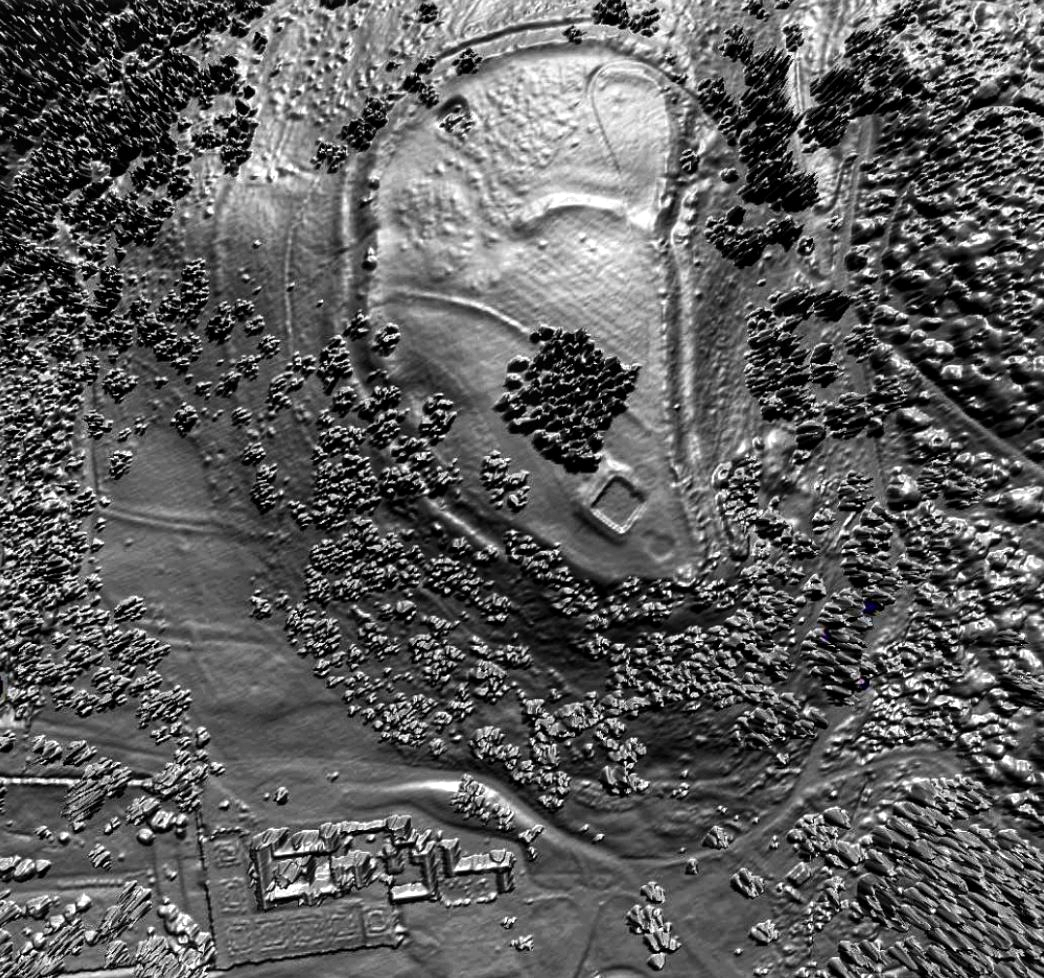
A lidar view of Margam Castle and Mynydd Y Castell Iron Age Hillfort

Mynydd y Castell Camp is a large hillfort enclosing 2.7 hectares (6.7 acres) in a D shape, on an isolated hill 500m east of Margam Abbey. There has been some quarrying, and possible other uses, which may have disrupted layouts of banks and entrances.

Half Moon Camp is a small Hillfort on a hilltop north of Margam Abbey, on the opposite side of the valley from Mynydd y Castell. It is crossed by an upland section of the Wales Coast Path.

=== Margam Abbey ===
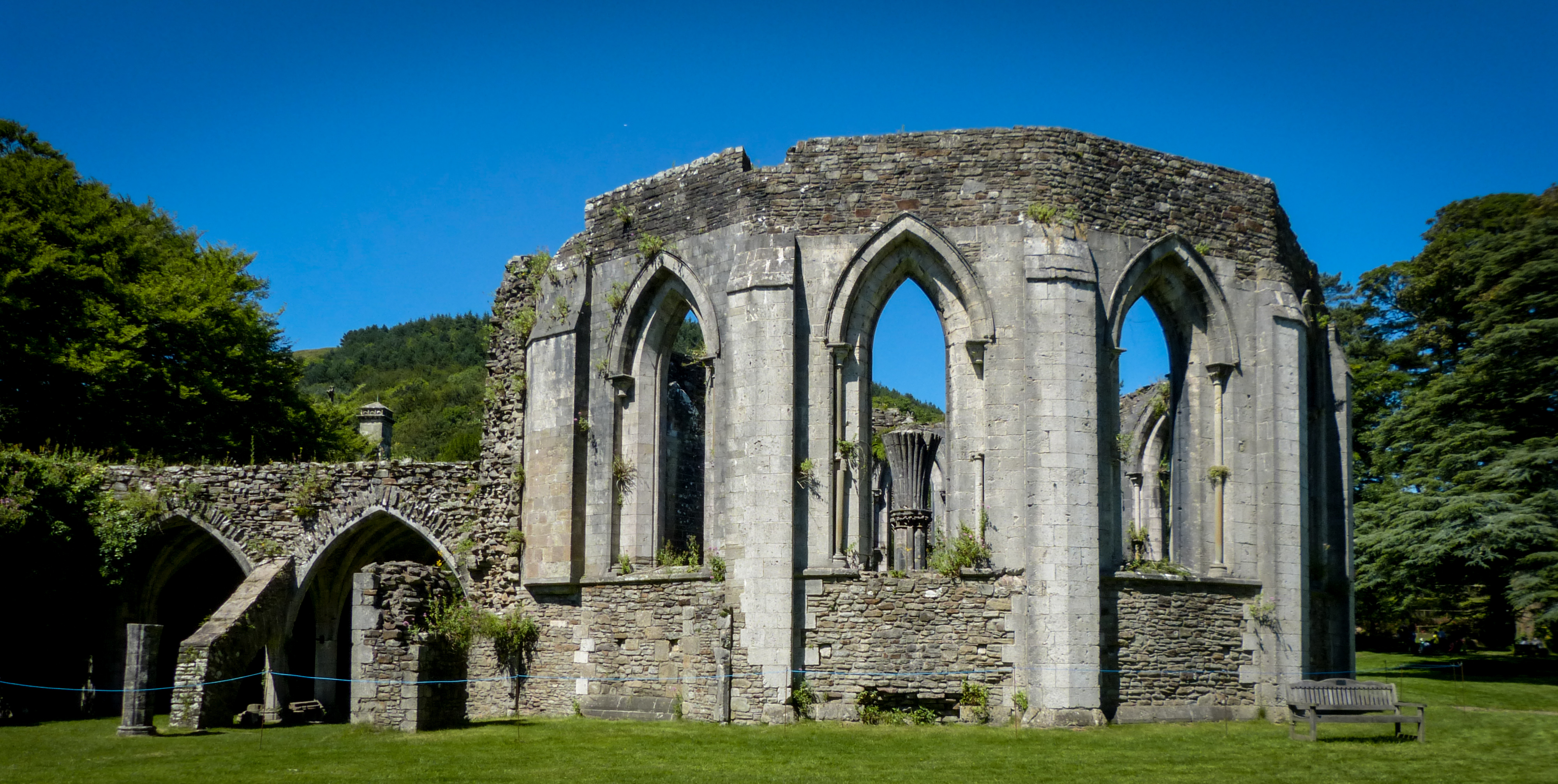
Margam Abbey ruins chapter house

In 1147, Margam Abbey was built. When the abbey was dissolved in 1536 the Abbey Church nave was retained as Margam Parish Church, whilst the ruins of various other of the abbey buildings stand in the park today, including a spectacular twelve-sided Chapter House.

A small chapel known as Hen Eglwys, also called Cryke Chapel and dated to 1470, was a grange of the Abbey on the hillside of Craig-y-capel. The gable-ends, with window tracery are the principle survivals, and provided a gothic landmark and viewpoint for the 19th-century parkland of Margam Castle. There was a burial ground and a nearby holy well known as Ffynnon Mair.

=== Margam Stones ===
During the 19th Century the Talbot family gathered together a collection of early Christian memorial stones from the locality, and placed them in and around the Abbey Chapter House, within what is now the Park. In 1892 they were put in the care of the Commissioners for Public works, and in 1932 they were moved into the nearby Church schoolroom, to become the Margam Stones Museum, now managed by Cadw.

=== Margam Castle ===
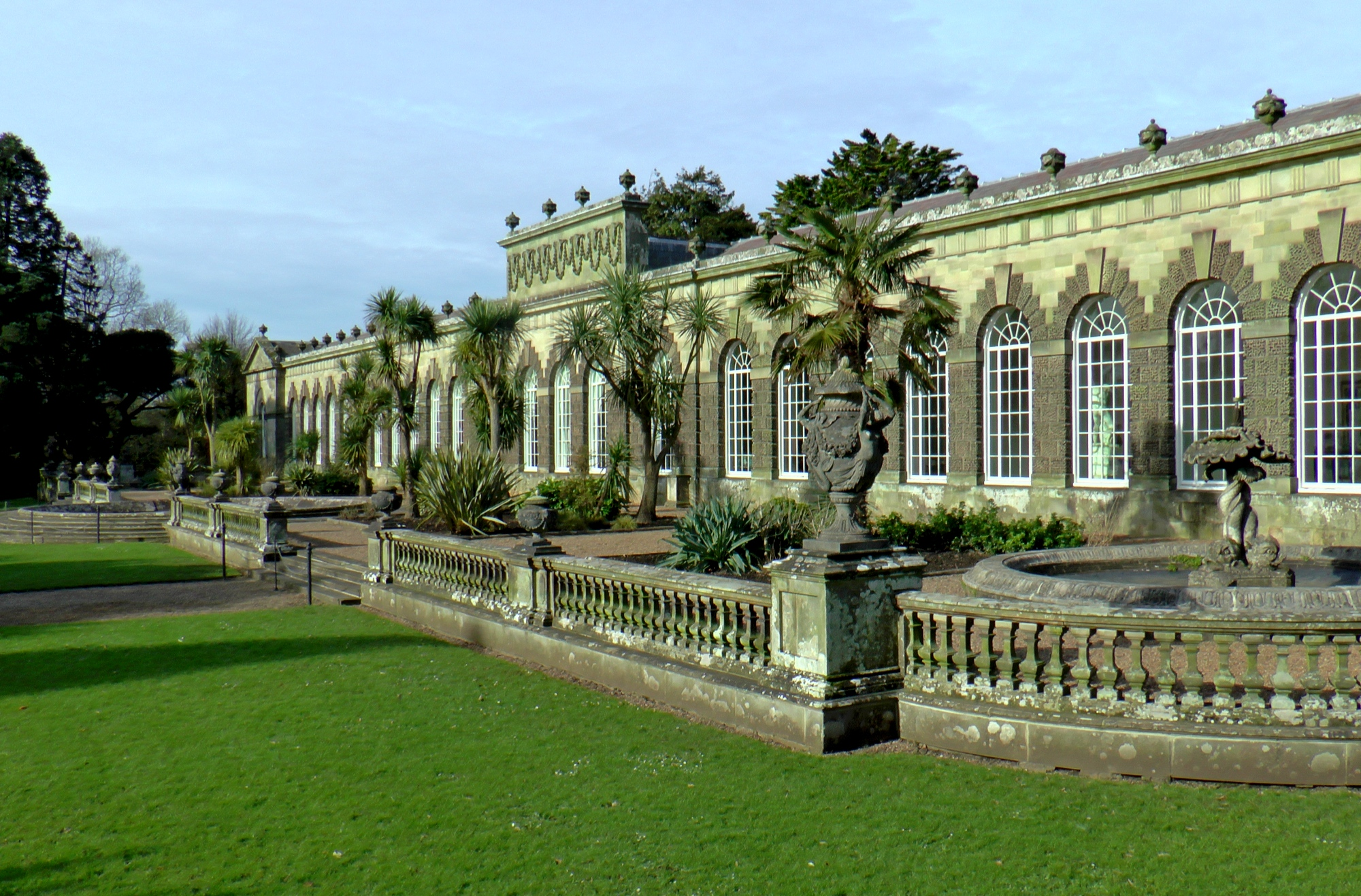
Margam Orangery

The Park also houses Margam Castle, a Tudor Gothic mansion built by Christopher Rice Mansel Talbot in the early nineteenth century. Sculptures and artwork are placed at different places along the paths which connect the house with the Orangery. The mansion is listed at Grade I.

=== The Orangery ===
The Margam estate had a famed collection of citrus trees and when the Mansell Talbots abandoned the estate for Penrice, they determined to maintain the collection and Keck was commissioned to design an orangery to house it. The result was "longer and more capacious than any other in Great Britain". The orangery is Grade I listed.

=== Banqueting House ===
The banqueting house, also known as the Temple of the Four Seasons, is the façade of a 17th-century banqueting house, repurposed and attached to a gardener's cottage, Ivy Cottage, during the construction of the new house in the 1830s. It comprises a double triumphal arch and is listed at Grade I.

=== Early warning radar ===
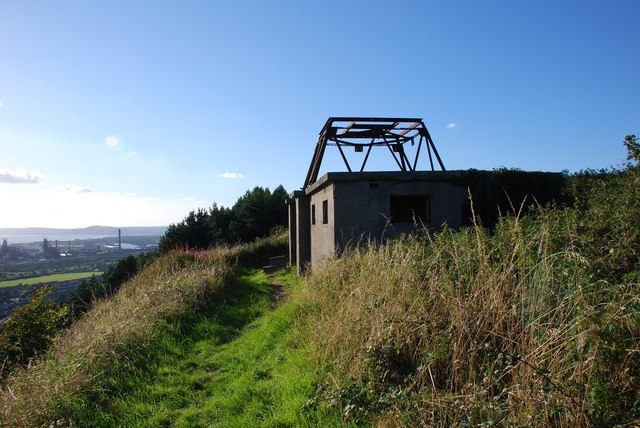
Margam Coast Defence Radar Station

On the escarpment above the motorway is one of a network of early warning radar stations that were built around the coast of Britain from 1941, to detect German bombers and shipping during World War II. Earlier Chain Home stations were able to spot aircraft at higher altitudes, so a second network, the Chain Home Low stations, of which Margam was one, were built to detect low-flying planes and shipping. The Margam station, which is a Scheduled Ancient Monument, has the inland route of the Wales Coast Path running past it. Three flat-topped buildings stand high on the escarpment, overlooking Port Talbot and Swansea Bay. They would have housed generators and control equipment, with a large antenna on the roof.

== Roman villa ==
In January 2026 it was announced that archaeologists had found evidence of the largest Roman villa in Wales in the deer park. It has an area of 572 m^{2} (6,160 sq ft), and is well preserved because the land has been neither ploughed nor built on. The villa is within a defensive enclosure, and there is a separate aisled building of 354 m^{2} (3,810 sq ft) which, it is thought, could be a storage barn or a meeting hall. As of January 2026 the exact location of the site within the deer park has not been made public, to protect it. The research has been carried out by ArchaeoMargam, a collaborative project involving Swansea University's Centre for Heritage Research and Training (CHART), Neath Port Talbot Council and Margam Abbey Church.

== Urdd National Eisteddfod ==
The Urdd National Eisteddfod was held in Margam Park in 2003 and 2025.

== See also ==
- List of gardens in Wales
- List of Scheduled Monuments in Neath Port Talbot

== Sources ==
- Newman, John (1995). Glamorgan. The Buildings of Wales. London, UK: Penguin Books. ISBN 978-0-300-09629-3. OCLC 1131253297.
