= Maes (eisteddfod) =

Site of a Welsh cultural festival

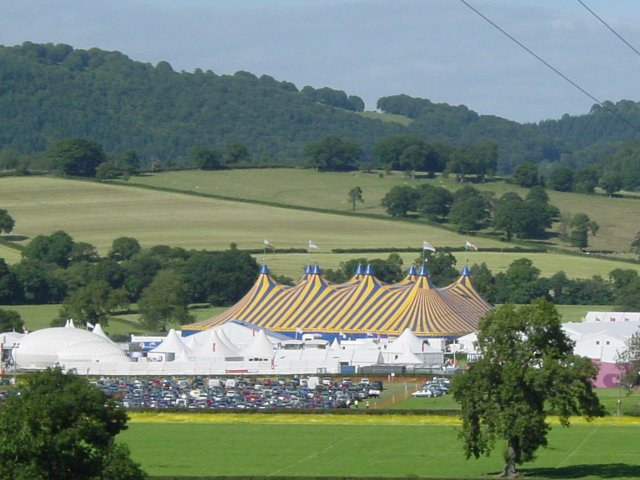
2003 Maes on the fields of Mathrafal Farm, Meifod, Powys

The Maes (Welsh for 'field') is the site of a Welsh eisteddfod, such as the National Eisteddfod or the Urdd Eisteddfod. All the main events and event venues are located on the Maes.

== Background ==
Central to the Maes is the competition venue, often a large temporary pavilion. From 2006 until 2014, the National Eisteddfod of Wales used a large pink pavilion, which arrived in four articulated lorries and took four days to erect. Prior to that, the pavilion had been a stripy green and yellow tent.

The Maes is usually located in a field or on open farmland. In 2017 the National Eisteddfod of Wales was almost cancelled when, on the initial weekend of the event, the Maes was turned into a sea of mud by stormy weather. The carparks on nearby farmland became unusable. A later report also concluded the accessibility for disabled visitors to the Maes was inadequate.

Normally the Maes is enclosed by a fence and an entrance fee is charged. However, in 2018 the National Eisteddfod was held in Cardiff Bay with an open, fence-free Maes. Existing, permanent buildings were used in the immediate area for the competitions and events, with an admission fee charged for these. Because of the additional security costs the event lost £290,000, but attracted an estimated 500,000 visitors, as opposed to the usual 150,000.

== Maes B ==
Maes of the National Eisteddfod from early years divided into different fields and Maes B began as the alternative field purely for young people.

Since 1997 Maes B is a regular music event (and venue) at the National Eisteddfod of Wales, featuring a line-up of contemporary Welsh language rock and pop musicians.

== See also ==
- Y Lle Celf
