= Urdd National Eisteddfod =

Annual Welsh-language youth festival

Urdd National Eisteddfod Eisteddfod Genedlaethol yr Urdd
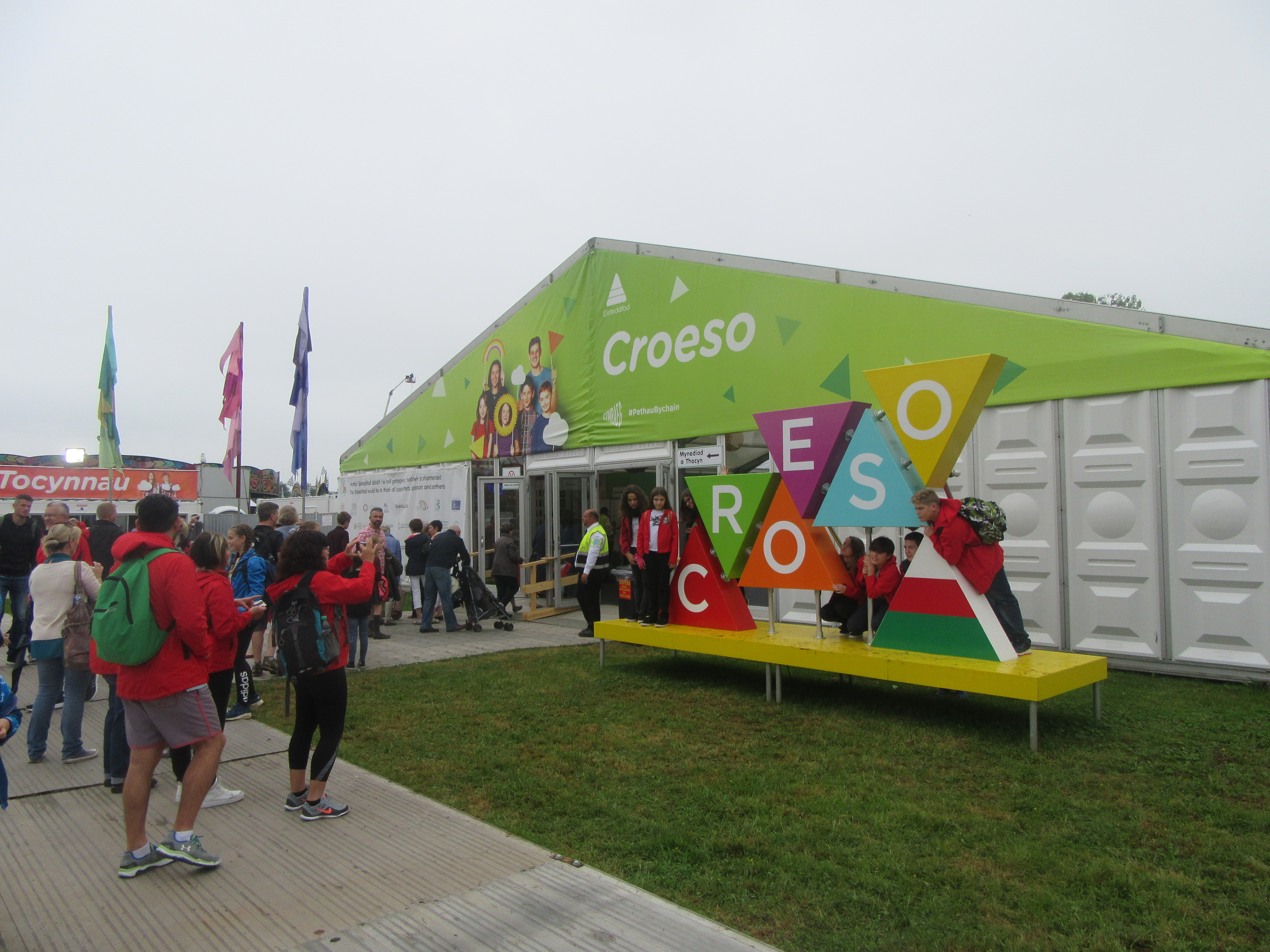
- Entrance to Urdd Eisteddfod 2017
- Status: Active
- Genre: Youth, arts
- Frequency: Annually
- Country: United Kingdom (Wales)
- Established: 1929; 97 years ago
- Participants: 15,000
- Attendance: 90,000
- Website: Official website
- Pronunciation of 'Eisteddfod Yr Urdd'

The Urdd National Eisteddfod (Welsh: Eisteddfod Genedlaethol Urdd Gobaith Cymru or Eisteddfod Genedlaethol yr Urdd) is an annual Welsh-language youth festival of literature, music and performing arts organised by Urdd Gobaith Cymru. It is the youth counterpart to the National Eisteddfod of Wales. Arguably Europe's largest youth festival, it is usually held during the last week of May, coinciding with schools' half term holiday. Locations normally alternate between north and south Wales, though in 2017, 2018 and 2019 they were held in south Wales. The Eisteddfod consists of competitive singing, recitation, art, composition, dance and instrumental events for contestants aged between 7 and 24 years. Regional qualifying heats are held in advance around Wales.

Eisteddfod yr Urdd's original motto is Er Mwyn Cymru (Welsh for 'For Wales' Sake').

== History ==
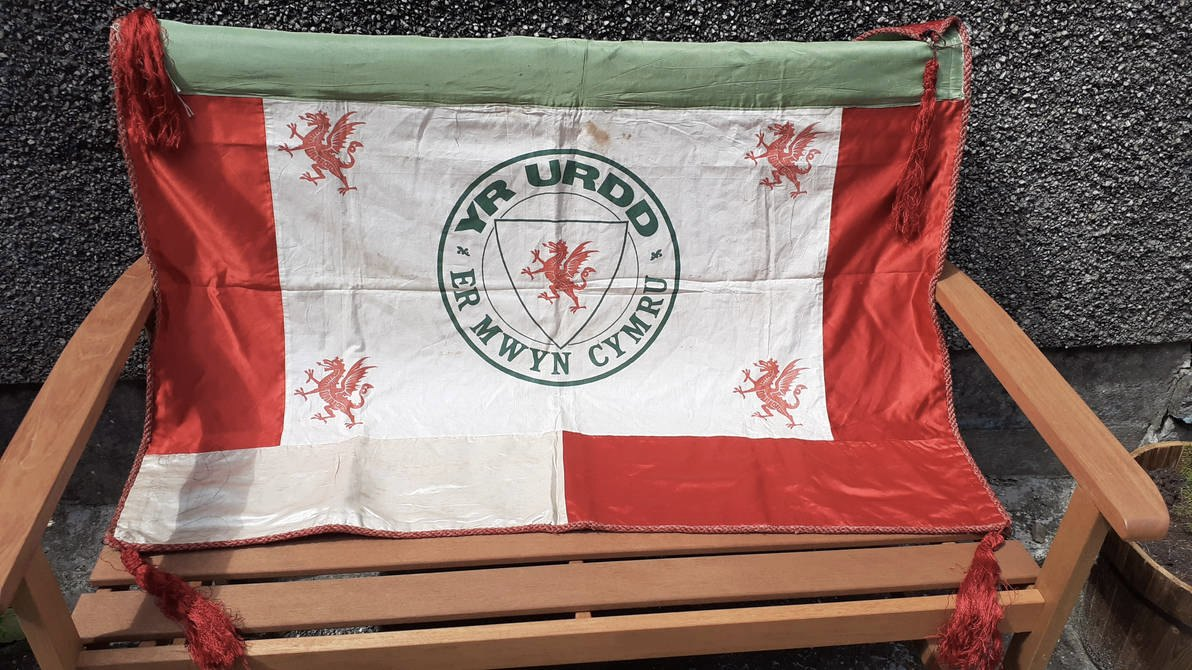
Eisteddfod yr Urdd flag, early 1930's

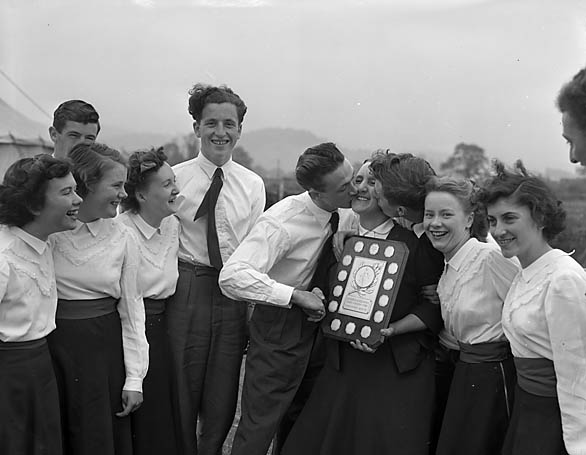
The festival at Bala in 1954.

The first Urdd National Eisteddfod was held in 1929 at Corwen. Originally held over two days, the festival has grown in recent times into a week-long celebration of competition and socialising. The initial festivals, which focused more on the celebration of young people enjoying the Welsh language, saw a few thousand visitors, but in 1935 the Eisteddfod at Carmarthen was heavily reported by the press resulting in 12,000 people attending and increasing the visibility of the event.

The Urdd Eisteddfod has become an annual tradition since its inauguration, but has not been staged on three occasions: during the Second World War, the 1940 Eisteddfod, held in Rhyl, still went ahead, but coming in the same week as the Dunkirk evacuation, it was a reduced festival, covering all the events in a single day. The Eisteddfod returned after the cessation of hostilities by returning to its roots at Corwen in 1946. In 2001, Gŵyl yr Urdd replaced the Eisteddfod with competitions and performances taking place at two venues (one in North Wales, one in the South) to minimise travel during the foot-and-mouth crisis and a virtual edition was staged during the Coronavirus pandemic of 2020 with all contributions submitted via video and judging conducted on live video calls. The full eisteddfod was postponed for another year, not taking place again until 2022.

During the 1950s the Eisteddfod began evolving away from the celebration and marching aspect towards more competitive events, mirroring the National Eisteddfod. An art exhibition was introduced in 1955 and a classical concert was included in 1958.

One of the more notable events to occur at the Urdd Eisteddfod took place in 1969 at the Aberystwyth event. Prince Charles was invited to attend and he was given a public platform to speak to the crowd. This was the year of his investiture as the Prince of Wales, a role that divided many Welsh people, and around a hundred people stood up and left as the Prince arrived on the stage. The fallout afterwards was also heated, with an editorial in the Welsh-language paper Y Cymro angering the then director of the Urdd.

The 2019 Cardiff and Vale event, held in Cardiff Bay, was the first Urdd National Eisteddfod to take place without entrance fees, or the traditional fenced Maes.

== Y Maes ==
The Eisteddfod is usually held in a large open field (maes). Accompanying peripheral attractions are designed to help fund the festival and include exhibition stalls, displays and sporting activities. Local and national corporations, retailers and other institutions are invited to participate, notably the Welsh universities.

== Competitions ==
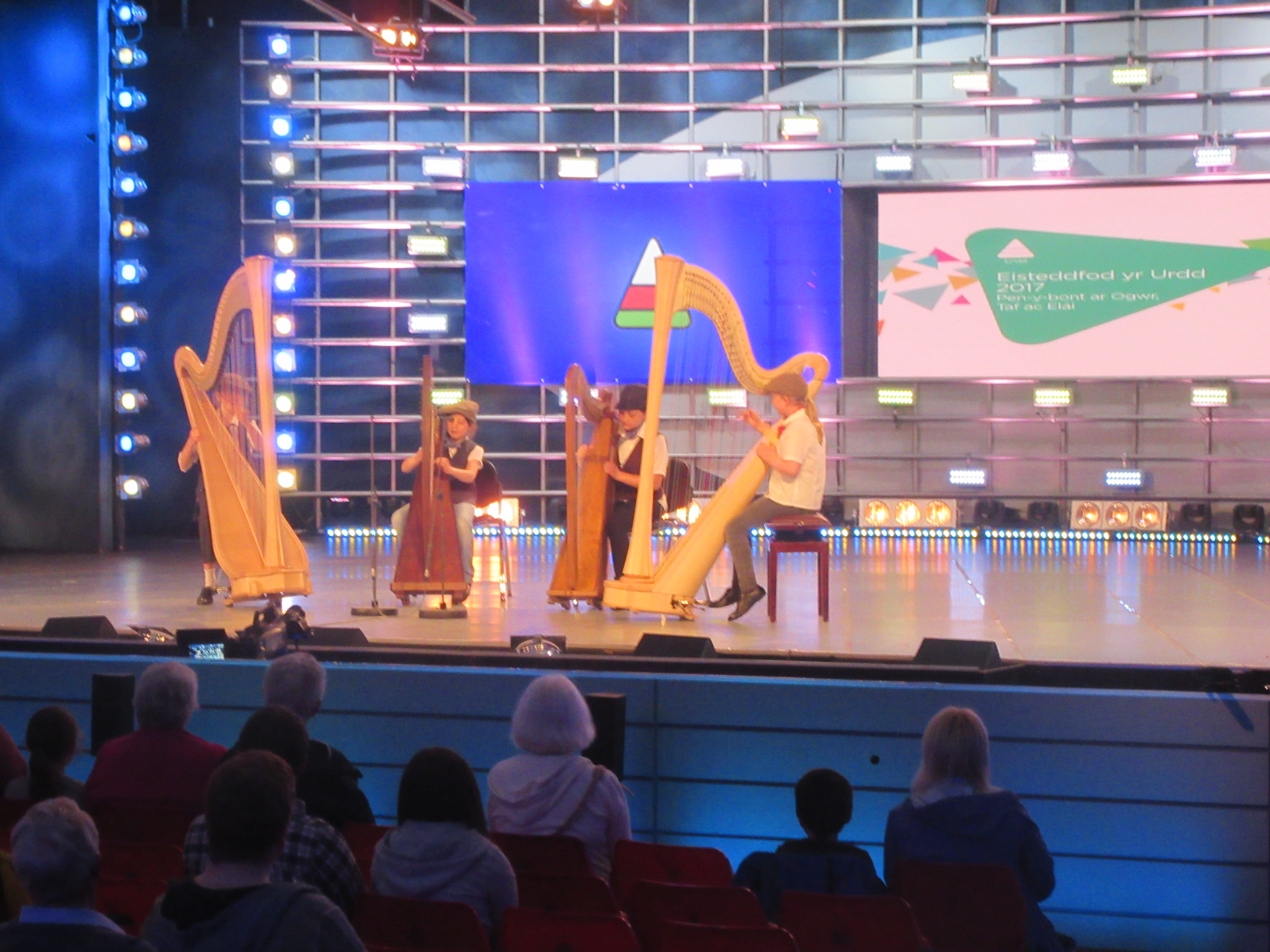
An ensemble harp entry.

According to the Urdd's own reporting, they estimate that roughly 40,000 children and young adults apply through regional rounds for places in the Eisteddfod competitions. Of these roughly 15,000 qualify through to take part at the National event. Preliminary rounds for the performing arts are then conducted on the day to establish a final three competitors who perform in front of the pavilion audience. A single judge then ranks the final three competitors to give the winning order.

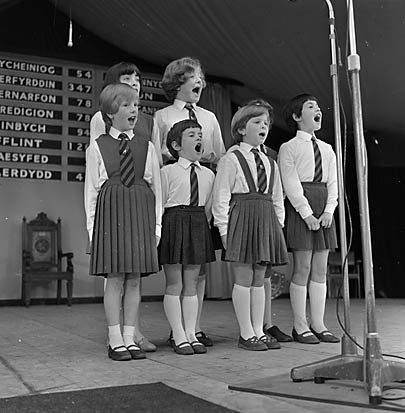
A group of children perform at Carmarthen in 1967. The old county score board is visible behind them.

In its earlier competitive years, children competed as part of their county, and a large scoreboard would tally the points to find an overall winner. Today the competitors compete for themselves, though their school or college plays a large part. The younger children will compete under their school's name and normally wear their school uniform while performing.

Competitors for the Urdd National Eisteddfod can be split into two main groups. The performing arts; which take place in the Pavilion, and the plastic and compositional arts which are judged prior to the Eisteddfod but are revealed as part of the festival.

Similarly to the senior National Eisteddfod of Wales, two of the showpiece events of the Urdd National Eisteddfod are the presentations of the Crown, for the best piece of literature, and the Chair, for strict metre or free verse poetry.

A Drama Medal competition was introduced in 1975. Winners receive a specially designed medal. Competitors have to write a short piece of drama, or monologue, for not more than two actors.

=== Pavilion competitions ===
The performing arts which are traditionally performed in the pavilion include:

- Cân Actol – A long narrative piece sung and acted in Welsh by a group of 30.
- Cerdd Dant – A choir of up to 12 voices sings in Welsh, accompanied by a harp, in a formulaic sequence of alternating melodies.
- Recitation – A group of up to 12 people recites a Welsh poem.
- Boys' Choir
- Girls' Choir
- dawnsio stryd street dancing
- solo recitation
- solo strings
- solo singing
- s.a.t.b. choir
- solo woodwind
- solo brass
- folk dancing
- solo piano

=== Other awards ===
The plastic arts, compositional and literature awards are announced on the pavilion stage at various points throughout the festival. Many of the categories are competed in age ranges; though there are several Medal awards and scholarships which are normally entered by older children and young adults.

Drawing and plastic arts

- Ceramics and pottery
- 2D Creative
- 3d Creative
- Print
- Computer graphics
- Photography
- Design
- Puppetry
- Textiles
- Drawing monochrome/colour

Individual awards

- Composer Medal
- Art Medal
- Art Scholarship

== Venues chosen for the event ==
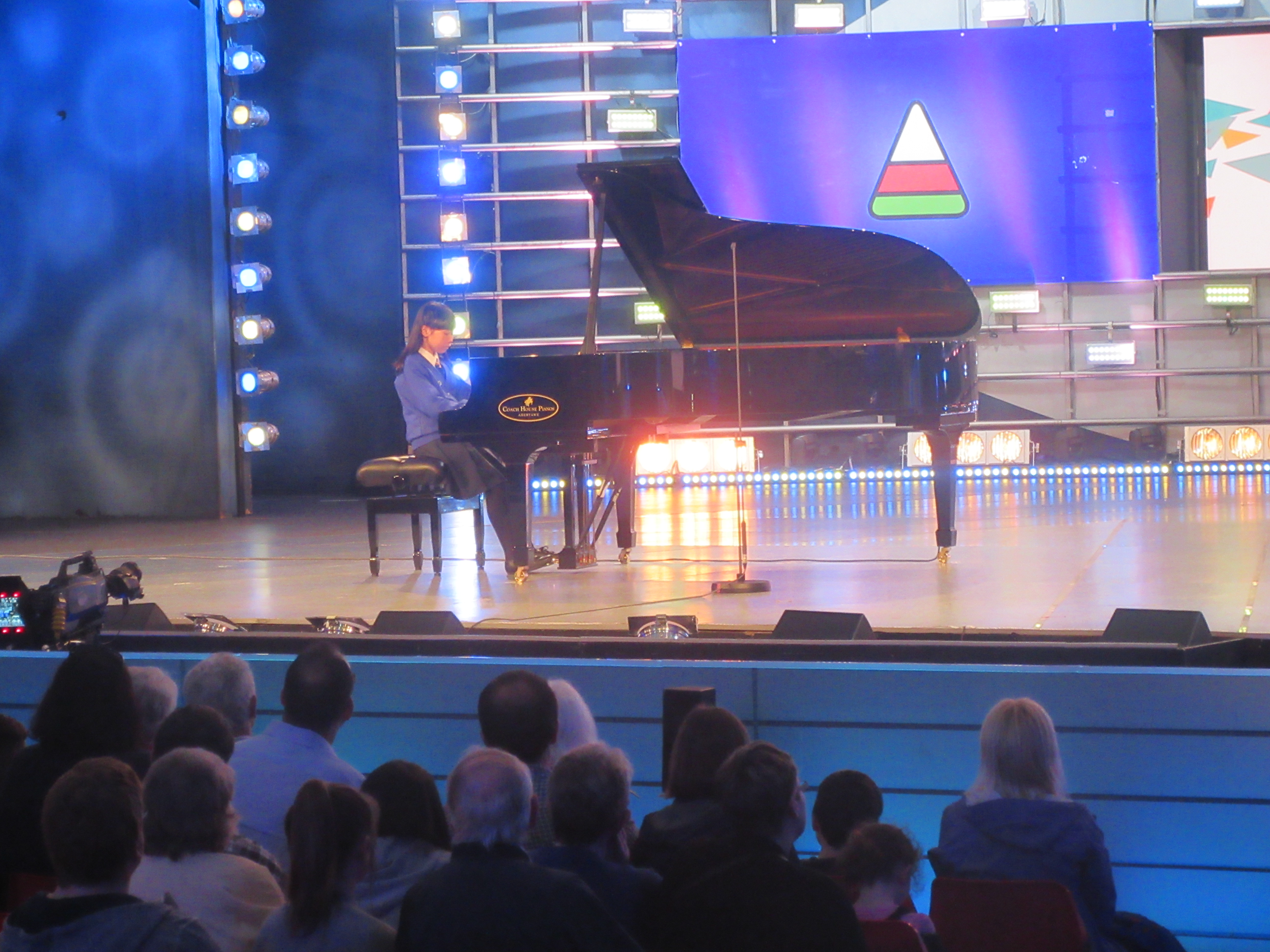
Solo piano competitor from 2017.

- 1929: Corwen
- 1930: Caernarfon
- 1931: Swansea
- 1932: Machynlleth
- 1933: Caerphilly
- 1934: Old Colwyn
- 1935: Carmarthen
- 1936: Blaenau Ffestiniog
- 1937: Gwaun-Cae-Gurwen
- 1938: Aberystwyth
- 1939: Llanelli
- 1940: Rhyl
- 1946: Corwen
- 1947: Treorchy
- 1948: Llangefni
- 1949: Pontarddulais
- 1950: Wrexham
- 1951: Fishguard
- 1952: Machynlleth
- 1953: Maesteg
- 1954: Bala, Gwynedd
- 1955: Abertridwr, Caerphilly
- 1956: Caernarfon
- 1957: Ammanford
- 1958: Mold, Flintshire
- 1959: Lampeter
- 1960: Dolgellau
- 1961: Aberdare
- 1962: Ruthin
- 1963: Brynamman
- 1964: Porthmadog
- 1965: Cardiff
- 1966: Holyhead
- 1967: Carmarthen
- 1968: Llanrwst
- 1969: Aberystwyth
- 1970: Llanidloes
- 1971: Swansea
- 1972: Bala, Gwynedd
- 1973: Pontypridd
- 1974: Rhyl
- 1975: Llanelli
- 1976: Menai Bridge
- 1977: Barry, Vale of Glamorgan
- 1978: Llanelwedd
- 1979: Maesteg
- 1980: Abergele
- 1981: Newcastle Emlyn
- 1982: Pwllheli
- 1983: Aberavon
- 1984: Mold, Flintshire
- 1985: Cardiff
- 1986: Dyffryn Ogwen
- 1987: Merthyr Tydfil
- 1988: Montgomeryshire
- 1989: Cwm Gwendraeth
- 1990: Nantlle Valley
- 1991: Taff-Ely
- 1992: Glyndŵr
- 1993: Lliw Valley
- 1994: Meirionnydd
- 1995: Preseli Pembrokeshire
- 1996: Maelor
- 1997: Islwyn
- 1998: Llŷn Peninsula
- 1999: Lampeter
- 2000: Conwy
- 2001: Gŵyl yr Urdd
- 2002: Cardiff
- 2003: Margam Country Park
- 2004: Llangefni
- 2005: Wales Millennium Centre
- 2006: Ruthin
- 2007: Carmarthen
- 2008: Conwy
- 2009: Cardiff Bay
- 2010: Llanerchaeron
- 2011: Swansea
- 2012: Glynllifon
- 2013: Boncath
- 2014: Bala, Gwynedd
- 2015: Caerphilly
- 2016: Flint, Flintshire
- 2017: Pencoed, Bridgend
- 2018: Builth Wells
- 2019: Cardiff Bay
- 2020: Virtually (known as Eisteddfodd T)
- 2021: Virtually
- 2022: Denbigh
- 2023: Llandovery
- 2024: Meifod
- 2025: Margam Park
- 2026: Anglesey
- 2027: Newport
- 2028: Gwynedd
- 2029: Ceredigion
