= List of winners of the Chair at the National Eisteddfod of Wales =

This is a list of winners of the Chair prize at the National Eisteddfod of Wales. Since the National Eisteddfod began to be held, in the late 19th century, specially designed chairs have been awarded to the winning poet, for their work of cynghanedd poetry. The ceremony is one of the main highlights of the National Eisteddfod.

Notable events include the first award in 1876. The winner, Thomas Jones, had died a few weeks earlier and the chair was draped in black cloth in his absence.

A similar event occurred in 1917 when the winner of the Chair, Hedd Wyn, had been killed a few weeks earlier in World War I. In the poet's absence the chair was draped in black cloth. His poetry and his death came to represent the futility of war.

In 1976 Dic Jones' poetry was chosen as the winner. However, when his identity was revealed he was disqualified because he was a member of the Eisteddfod's Literature Panel. The Chair was awarded instead to a "reluctant" Alan Llwyd.

== Winners of the chair at the National Eisteddfod ==
Year	Location	Poem	Poet	Bardic name
1876	Wrexham		Thomas Jones	Taliesin o Eifion
1877	Caernarfon	Ieuenctid	William Roberts (Porthmadog)	Gwilym Eryri
1880	Caernarfon	Athrylith	W B Joseph	Y Myfyr
1881	Merthyr Tydfil	Cariad	Evan Rees	Dyfed
1882	Denbigh	Dyn	No winner	
1883	Cardiff	Y Llong	No winner	
1884	Liverpool	Gwilym Hiraethog	Evan Rees	Dyfed
1885	Aberdare	Y Gwir yn Erbyn y Byd	Watkin Hesekiah Williams	Watcyn Wyn
1886	Caernarfon	Gobaith	Richard Davies	Tafolog
1887	London	Y Frenhines Victoria	Robert Arthur Williams	
1888	Wrexham	Peroriaeth	Thomas Jones	Tudno
1889	Brecon	Y Beibl Cymraeg	Evan Rees	Dyfed
1890	Bangor	Y Llafurwr	Thomas Jones	Tudno
1891	Swansea	Yr Haul	John Owen Williams	Pedrog
1892	Rhyl	Y Cenhadwr	Evan Jones	Gurnos
1893	Pontypridd	Pulpud Cymru	J Ceulanydd Williams	
1894	Caernarfon	Hunanaberth	H. Elvet Lewis	Elfed
1895	Llanelli	Dedwyddwch	John Owen Williams	Pedrog
1896	Llandudno	Tuhwnt i'r Llen	Ben Davies	
1897	Newport	Brawdgarwch	J. T. Job	Job
1898	Blaenau Ffestiniog	Awen	R. O. Hughes	Elfyn
1899	Cardiff	Gladstone	No winner	
1900	Liverpool	Y Bugail	John Owen Williams	Pedrog
1901	Merthyr Tydfil	Y Diwygiwr	Evan Rees	Dyfed
1902	Bangor	Ymadawiad Arthur	T. Gwynn Jones	
1903	Llanelli	Y Celt	John Thomas Job	Job
1904	Rhyl	Geraint ac Enid	Machreth Rees	
1905	Mountain Ash	Gorau arf, Dysg	No winner	
1906	Caernarfon	Y Lloer	J. J. Williams	
1907	Swansea	John Bunyan	T Davies	
1908	Llangollen	Ceiriog	J J Williams	
1909	London	Gwlad y Bryniau	T. Gwynn Jones	
1910	Colwyn Bay	Yr Haf	R. Williams Parry	
1911	Carmarthen	Iorwerth VII	Gwilym Ceiriog	
1912	Wrexham	Y Mynydd	T. H. Parry-Williams	
1913	Abergavenny	Aelwyd y Cymro	T J Thomas	Sarnicol
1914	Not held: First World War	N/A	N/A	N/A
1915	Bangor	Eryri	T H Parry-Williams	
1916	Aberystwyth	Ystrad Fflur	J Ellis Williams	
1917	Birkenhead	Yr Arwr	Ellis Evans	Hedd Wyn
1918	Neath	Eu Nêr a Folant	J T Job	Job
1919	Corwen	Y Proffwyd	Cledlyn Davies	
1920	Barry	Yr Oes Aur	No winner	
1921	Caernarfon	Min y Môr Meuryn	R J Rowlands	
1922	Ammanford	Y Gaeaf	John Lloyd-Jones	
1923	Mold	Dychweliad Arthur	Cledlyn Davies	
1924	Pontypool	I'r Duw nid Adwaenir	Albert Evans-Jones	Cynan
1925	Pwllheli	Cantre'r Gwaelod	Dewi Morgan	
1926	Swansea	Y Mynach	D. Gwenallt Jones	Gwenallt
1927	Holyhead	Y Derwydd	No winner	
1928	Treorchy	Y Sant	No winner	
1929	Liverpool	Dafydd ap Gwilym	Dewi Emrys	
1930	Llanelli	Y Galilead	Dewi Emrys	
1931	Bangor	Breuddwyd y Bardd	D. Gwenallt Jones	
1932	Aberafan	Mam	Daniel John Davies (D.J. Davies)	
1933	Wrexham	Harlech	Edgar Phillips	Trefin
1934	Neath	Ogof Arthur	W Morris	
1935	Caernarfon	Magdalen	Gwyndaf Evans	
1936	Fishguard	Ty Ddewi	Simon B Jones	
1937	Machynlleth	Y Ffin	T. Rowland Hughes	
1938	Cardiff	Rwy'n Edrych Dros y Bryniau Pell	Gwilym R Jones	
1939	Denbigh	A hi yn dyddhau	No winner	
1940	Mountain Ash (radio)	Pererinion	Thomas Rowland Hughes	
1941	Old Colwyn	Hydref	Rowland Jones	
1942	Cardigan	Rhyfel neu "Creiddylad"	No winner	
1943	Bangor	Cymylau Amser	Dewi Emrys	
1944	Llandybie	Ofn	D Lloyd Jenkins	
1945	Rhos	Yr Oes Aur	T Parry Jones	
1946	Mountain Ash	Awdl Foliant i'r Amaethwr	Geraint Bowen	
1947	Colwyn Bay	Maelgwn Gwynedd	John Eilian	
1948	Bridgend	Yr Alltud	Dewi Emrys	
1949	Dolgellau	Y Graig	Rowland Jones	
1950	Caerphilly	Awdl Foliant i'r Glowr	Gwilym Tilsley | Tilsli	
1951	Llanrwst	Y Dyffryn	Brinley Richards	
1952	Aberystwyth	Dwylo	John Evans	
1953	Rhyl	Y Ffordd	E Lloyd Williams	
1954	Ystradgynlais	Yr Argae	John Evans	
1955	Pwllheli	Gwrtheyrn	G Ceri Jones	
1956	Aberdare	Gwraig	Mathonwy Hughes	
1957	Llangefni	Cwm Carnedd	Gwilym Tilsley	
1958	Ebbw Vale	Caerllion ar Wysg	T. Llew Jones	
1959	Caernarfon	Y Dringwr	T Llew Jones	
1960	Cardiff	Dydd Barn or "Morgannwg"	No winner	
1961	Rhosllanerchrugog	Awdl Foliant i Gymru	Emrys Edwards	
1962	Llanelli	Llef un yn Llefain	Caradog Pritchard	
1963	Llandudno	Genesis	No winner	
1964	Swansea	Patagonia	R Bryn Williams	
1965	Newtown	Yr Ymchwil	W D Williams	
1966	Aberafan	Cynhaeaf	Dic Jones	Dic yr Hendre
1967	Bala	Y Gwyddonydd	Emrys Roberts	
1968	Barry	Awdl Foliant i'r Morwr	R Bryn Williams	
1969	Flint	Yr Alwad	James Nicholas	
1970	Ammanford	Y Twrch Trwyth	Tomi Evans	
1971	Bangor	Y Chwarelwr	Emrys Roberts	
1972	Haverfordwest	Preselau	Dafydd Owen	
1973	Ruthin	Llef Dros y Lleiafrifoedd	Alan Llwyd	Meilir Emrys Owen
1974	Carmarthen	Y Dewin	Moses Glyn Jones	
1975	Criccieth	Afon	Gerallt Lloyd Owen	
1976	Cardigan	Gwanwyn	Alan Llwyd	Meilir Emrys Owen
1977	Wrexham	Llygredd	Donald Evans	
1978	Cardiff	Y Ddinas	No winner	
1979	Caernarfon	Gwynedd	No winner	
1980	Lliw Valley	Y Ffwrnais	Donald Evans	
1981	Machynlleth	Y Frwydr	John Gwilym Jones	
1982	Swansea	Cilmeri	Gerallt Lloyd Owen	
1983	Anglesey	Ynys	Einion Evans	
1984	Lampeter	Y Pethau Bychain	Aled Rhys Wiliam	
1985	Rhyl	Cynefin	Robat Powell	
1986	Fishguard	Y Cwmwl	Gwynn ap Gwilym	
1987	Porthmadog	Llanw a Thrai	Ieuan Wyn	
1988	Newport	Storm	Elwyn Edwards	
1989	Llanrwst	Y Daith	Idris Reynolds	
1990	Rhymney Valley	Gwythiennau	Myrddin ap Dafydd	
1991	Mold	Awdl Foliant Merch ein Hamserau	Robin Llwyd ab Owain	
1992	Aberystwyth	A Fo Ben ...	Idris Reynolds	
1993	Llanelwedd	Gwawr	Meirion MacIntyre Huws	
1994	Neath	Chwyldro	Emyr Lewis	
1995	Abergele	Y Môr	Tudur Dylan Jones	
1996	Llandeilo	Grisiau	R O Williams	
1997	Bala	Gwaddol	Ceri Wyn Jones	
1998	Bridgend	Fflamau	No winner	
1999	Anglesey	Pontydd	Gwenallt Llwyd Ifan	
2000	Llanelli	Agored	Llion Jones	
2001	Denbigh	Dadeni	Mererid Hopwood	
2002	St David's	Llwybrau	Myrddin ap Dafydd	
2003	Meifod	Drysau	Twm Morys	
2004	Newport	Tir Neb	Huw Meirion Edwards	
2005	Snowdonia	Gorwelion	Tudur Dylan Jones	
2006	Swansea	Tonnau	Gwynfor ab Ifor	
2007	Flintshire	Ffin	T. James Jones	
2008	Cardiff	Tir Newydd	Hilma Ll. Edwards	
2009	Meirion	Cyffro	No winner	
2010	Blaenau Gwent and heads of the valleys	Ennill Tir	Tudur Hallam	
2011	Wrexham	Clawdd Terfyn	Rhys Iorwerth	
2012	Vale of Glamorgan	Llanw	Dylan Iorwerth	
2013	Denbighshire	Lleisiau	No winner	
2014	Carmarthenshire	Lloches	Ceri Wyn Jones	
2015	Montgomery and borderlands	Gwe	Hywel Griffiths	
2016	Monmouthshire	Ffiniau	Aneirin Karadog	
2017	Anglesey	Arwr	Osian Rhys Jones	
2018	Cardiff	Porth	Gruffudd Eifion Owen	
2019	Llanrwst	Gorwelion	T. James Jones	
2020	Not held: COVID-19 pandemic	N/A	N/A	N/A
2021	"Eisteddfod AmGen" (on-line virtual eisteddfod)	Deffro	Gwenallt Llwyd Ifan	
2022	Tregaron	Traeth	Llŷr Gwyn Lewis	Cnwt Gwirion
2023	Llŷn ac Eifionydd	Llif	Alan Llwyd	Meilir Emrys Owen
2024	Rhondda Cynon Taf	Cadwyn	Carwyn Eckley	Brynmair
2025	Wrexham		Tudur Hallam	
2026	Pembrokeshire	Llinell / Llinellau	Emyr Lewis	

=== Multiple wins ===
Name	Number of wins	Years
Evan Rees	4	1881, 1884, 1889, 1901
Thomas Jones	3	1876, 1888, 1890
John Evans	2	1952, 1954
John Owen Williams	3	1891, 1895, 1900
Alan Llwyd	3	1973, 1976, 2023
T Gwyn Jones	2	1902, 1909
JJ Williams	2	1906, 1908
TH Parry Williams	2	1912, 1915
Cledlyn Davies	2	1919, 1923
D Gwenallt Jones	2	1926, 1931
Dewi Emrys	4	1929, 1930, 1943, 1948
T. Rowland Hughes	2	1937, 1940
Rowland Jones	2	1941, 1949
Gwilym Tilsley	2	1950, 1957
T Llew Jones	2	1958, 1959
R Bryn Williams	2	1964, 1968
Emrys Roberts	2	1967, 1971
Gerallt Lloyd Owen	2	1975, 1982
Donald Evans	2	1977, 1980
Idris Reynolds	2	1989, 1992
Tudur Dylan Jones	2	1995, 2005
Ceri Wyn Jones	2	1997, 2014
T James Jones	2	2007, 2019
Gwenallt Llwyd Ifan	2	1999, 2021
Tudur Hallam	2	2010, 2025
Emyr Lewis	2	1994, 2026
