= Welsh Learner of the Year =

Eisteddfod of Wales award

List of winners of the Welsh Learner of the Year (Welsh: Tlws Dysgwr y Flwyddyn), a competition held every year at the National Eisteddfod of Wales.

- 1983 - Shirley Flower, Clwyd
- 1986 - Alan Whittick, Powys
- 1988 - Jenny Pye, Llanbedrgoch, Anglesey
- 1989 - Stel Farrar, Mynydd Llandegai, Gwynedd
- 1990 - Parchg John Gillibrand, Carmarthenshire
- 1991 - Jo Knell, Cardiff
- 1992 - Sandy Rolls, Penderyn, Rhondda Cynon Taf
- 1993 - Janet Charton, Betws y Coed, Conwy
- 1994 - Sarah Williams, Llandeilo, Carmarthenshire
- 1995 - Paul Attridge, Wrexham
- 1996 - Mark Aizelwood, Newport
- 1997 - Paul Elliott, Newport
- 1998 - Stephen Wilshaw, Cardiff
- 1999 - Alison Layland, Oswestry
- 2000 - Sandra de Pol, Argentina
- 2001 - Spencer Harris, Wrexham
- 2002 - Alice Traille James, Crymych, Pembrokeshire
- 2003 - Mike Hughes, Carno, Powys
- 2004 - Lois Arnold, Abergavenny, Monmouthshire
- 2005 - Sue Massey, Penmaenmawr, Conwy
- 2006 - Stuart Imm, Cwmbran, Torfaen
- 2007 - Julie MacMillan, Rhondda
- 2008 - Madison Tazu, Cardiff
- 2009 - Meggan Lloyd Prys, Rhiwlas, Bangor, Gwynedd
- 2010 - Julia Hawkins, Crickhowell
- 2011 - Kay Holder, Vale of Glamorgan
- 2012 - Isaias Grandis, Trevelin, Patagonia, Argentina
- 2013 - Martyn Croydon, Llŷn, Gwynedd
- 2014 - Joella Price, Cardiff
- 2015 - Gari Bevan, Merthyr Tydfil
- 2016 - Hannah Roberts, Brynmawr, Blaenau Gwent
- 2017 - Emma Chappell, Deiniolen, Gwynedd
- 2018 - Matt Spry, Cardiff
- 2019 - Fiona Collins, Carrog, Denbighshire
- 2020 - Jazz Langdon, Narberth, Pembrokeshire
- 2021 - David Thomas, Carmarthenshire
- 2022 - Joe Healy, Cardiff
- 2023 - Alison Roberts, Anglesey
- 2024 - Antwn Owen-Hicks, Sirhowy
- 2025 - Lucy Cowley, North Wales
