= 2016 Monmouthshire and District National Eisteddfod =

2016 eisteddfod in Abergavenny, Wales

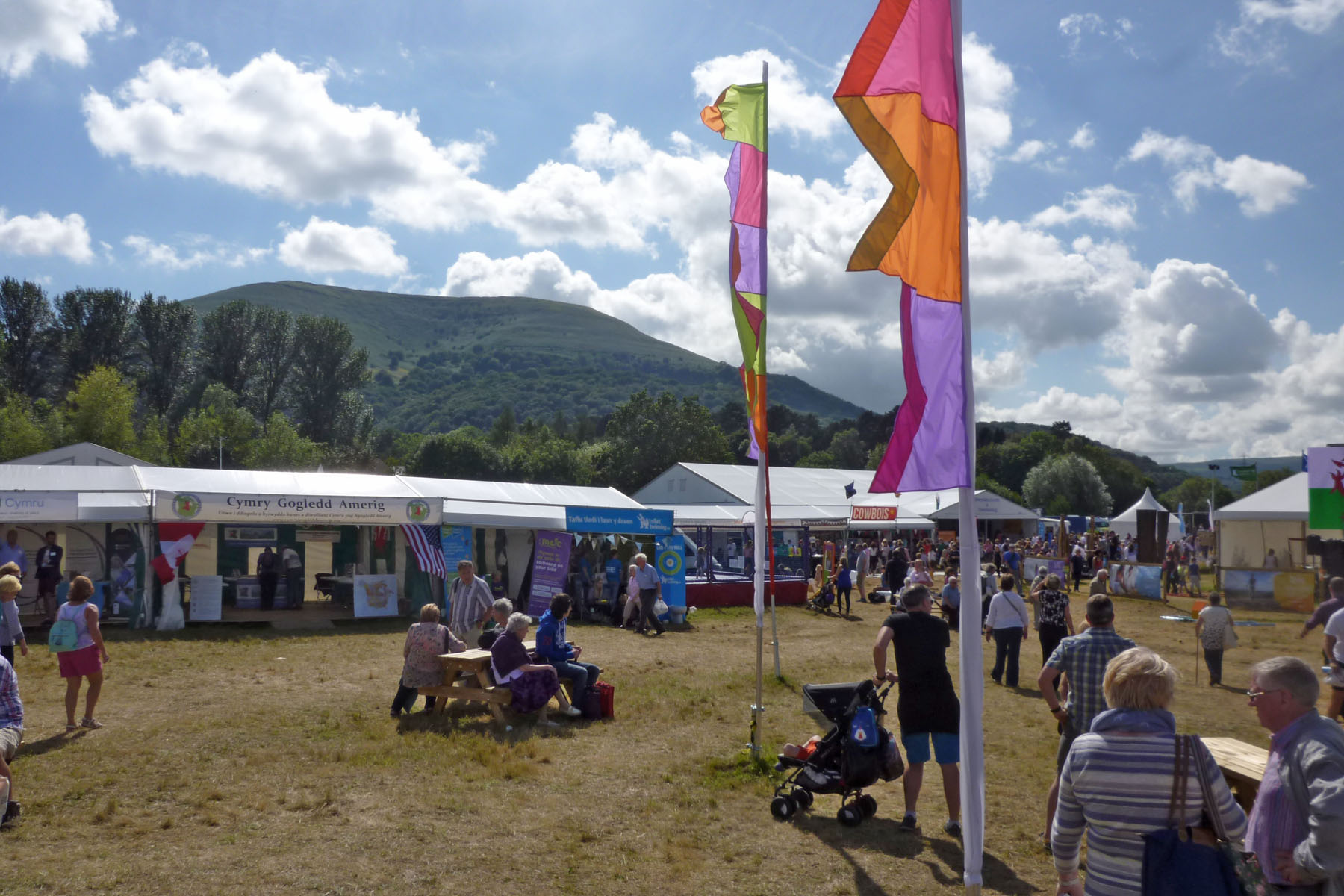
- 2016 Eisteddfod with Blorenge as a backdrop
- Native name: Eisteddfod Genedlaethol Sir Fynwy a'r Cyffiniau 2016
- Date: 30 July – 6 August 2016
- Duration: 8 days
- Location: Abergavenny, Monmouthshire, Wales
- Theme: Welsh language and culture

The 2016 Monmouthshire and District National Eisteddfod (Welsh: Eisteddfod Genedlaethol Sir Fynwy a'r Cyffiniau 2016) was held in the town of Abergavenny, Monmouthshire, from 30 July till 6 August 2016. This was the first time the National Eisteddfod of Wales had been held in Abergavenny (or Monmouthshire) since 1913.

== Background ==
The National Eisteddfod of Wales had been held every year since 1861, with the exception of 1914 because of World War I. It is hosted by a different region of Wales each year. Around 1,000 events and 200 competitions are held, in poetry, music, dance, drama and literature, giving it a claim to be probably the largest music and poetry festival in Europe. The main competition events are the Crowning of the Bard and the Chairing of the Bard.

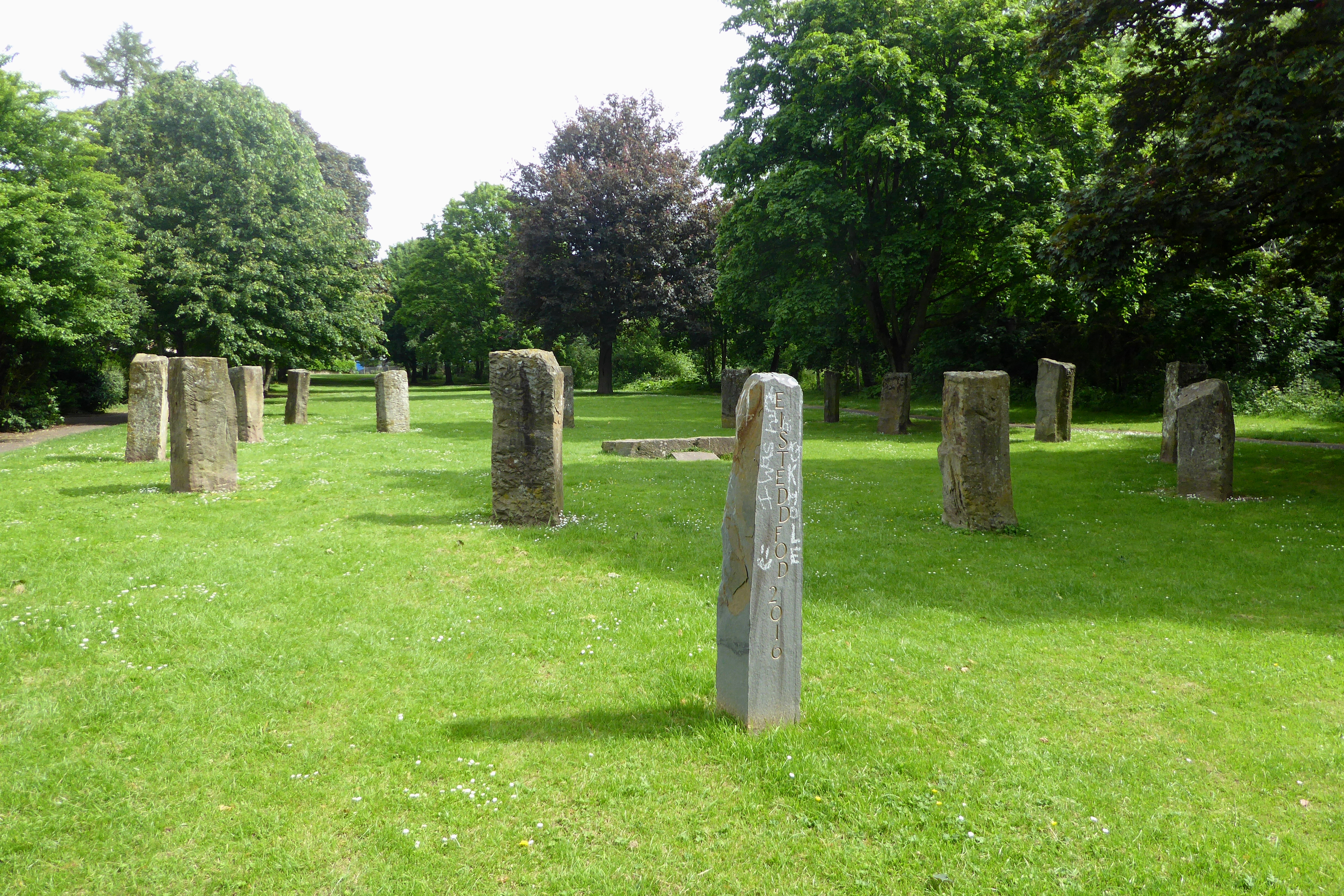
1912 Gorsedd stone circle in Abergavenny

The National Eisteddfod had last been held in Monmouthshire when it took place in Abergavenny in 1913. Monmouthshire had had an ambiguous relationship with Wales, having been omitted from the Laws in Wales Act 1542 and not placed officially in Wales until 1974. At the turn of the 21st-century less than 10% of the population spoke Welsh.

In 2002 Monmouthshire County Council voted to invite the National Eisteddfod to the county. They had already employed a Welsh language and cultural tourism officer to help change perceptions of the county. The Eisteddfod Council accepted the bid, with initial proposals to bring the festival to Monmouthshire in 2010 or 2012. In March 2001 Abergavenny's Gorsedd stones, from the 1913 Eisteddfod, had been relocated from private land to Swan Meadows public park.

In 2010 the National Eisteddfod was held in neighbouring Blaenau Gwent. Monmouthshire was chosen to hold the festival in 2016.

== Proclamation ==
The proclamation of the Monmouthshire Eisteddfod took place in Caldicot on 27 June 2015. There was a procession through the town centre to the castle gardens, led by the Gorsedd of Bards, followed by the Proclamation Ceremony at Caldicot Castle. Music and dance performances took place on two stages in the town centre.

== Preparations ==
In November 2015 it was approved that Abergavenny would be the site of the 2016 National Eisteddfod. The festival Maes would be located on the 16-hectare Castle Meadows, between the town centre and the River Usk.

Community groups in Monmouthshire had a target of raising £300,000 towards the costs of the Eisteddfod. Abergavenny was tasked to raise £100,000 of this. Abergavenny Town Council pledged to give £30,000.

On 14 June 2016 a special ceremony took place in Monmouth to present the 2016 National Eisteddfod Chair and Crown to the Eisteddfod Executive Committee.

== 2016 location and facilities ==
The Eisteddfod events took place on the Maes located on Castle Meadows, close to the town centre, transport links and facilities.

For 2016, the main pavilion was no longer held in the "iconic" pink tent of the previous 10 years, and instead was held in a new, sturdier temporary building called "Evolution".

The presentation of Welsh Learner of the Year took place in the Angel Hotel in Abergavenny.

== Notable events and competitions ==
=== Cymanfa Ganu ===
The Cymanfa Ganu (a large gathering to sing hymns) took place in the Pavilion on the evening of Sunday 31 July, celebrating 100 years since the event was first held at the National Eisteddfod. The first Cymanfa Ganu took place on 18 August 1916, in the midst of World War I, and was addressed by prime minister David Lloyd George.

=== Crowning of the Bard ===
Elinor Gwynn, an environmentalist who was brought up in Cardiff and Carmarthen, was the winner of the 2016 Eisteddfod Crown. Under the pen name of Carreg Lefn she submitted a collection of free verse poetry on the subject of Llwybrau (Paths).

=== Chairing of the Bard ===
The 2016 Chair was won by former S4C presenter and musician, Aneirin Karadog, for his collection of cynghanedd poetry on the subject of Ffiniau (boundaries/borders). His poems explored his worries about his children's future in a turbulent world. There were nine entrants in total to the competition.

=== Prose Medal ===
The Prose Medal (for a novel of less than 40,000 words) was awarded to Eurig Salisbury out of 14 entrants for the competition. His novel, Cai, described the experiences of a student in the Aberystwyth area and the difficulties of living in west Wales.

=== Welsh Learner of the Year ===
The shortlist for Welsh Learner of the Year had to be extended from the usual four, to five learners this year. The winner was Hannah Roberts from Brynmawr, who was presented with a £300 prize.

=== Gorsedd of Bards ===
Despite their performance at the 2016 Euros, the Wales national football team were not nominated for an honour by the Gorsedd. Singer songwriter Arfon Wyn resigned his membership of the Gorsedd in protest. Archdruid Geraint Lloyd Owen said the team wouldn't be honoured, because some of them didn't speak Welsh, though the Gorsedd Recorder, Penri Roberts, pointed out that nominations for awards had closed in February but they were "all are very proud of the team’s achievement at the Euros".

== Attendance ==
Over 140,000 visitors attended the 2026 Eisteddfod, which was almost twice the total population of Monmouthshire. 19,086 attended on the final Saturday.

== See also ==
- 2018 Cardiff National Eisteddfod
