= Crowning of the Bard =

Ceremony in an eisteddfod

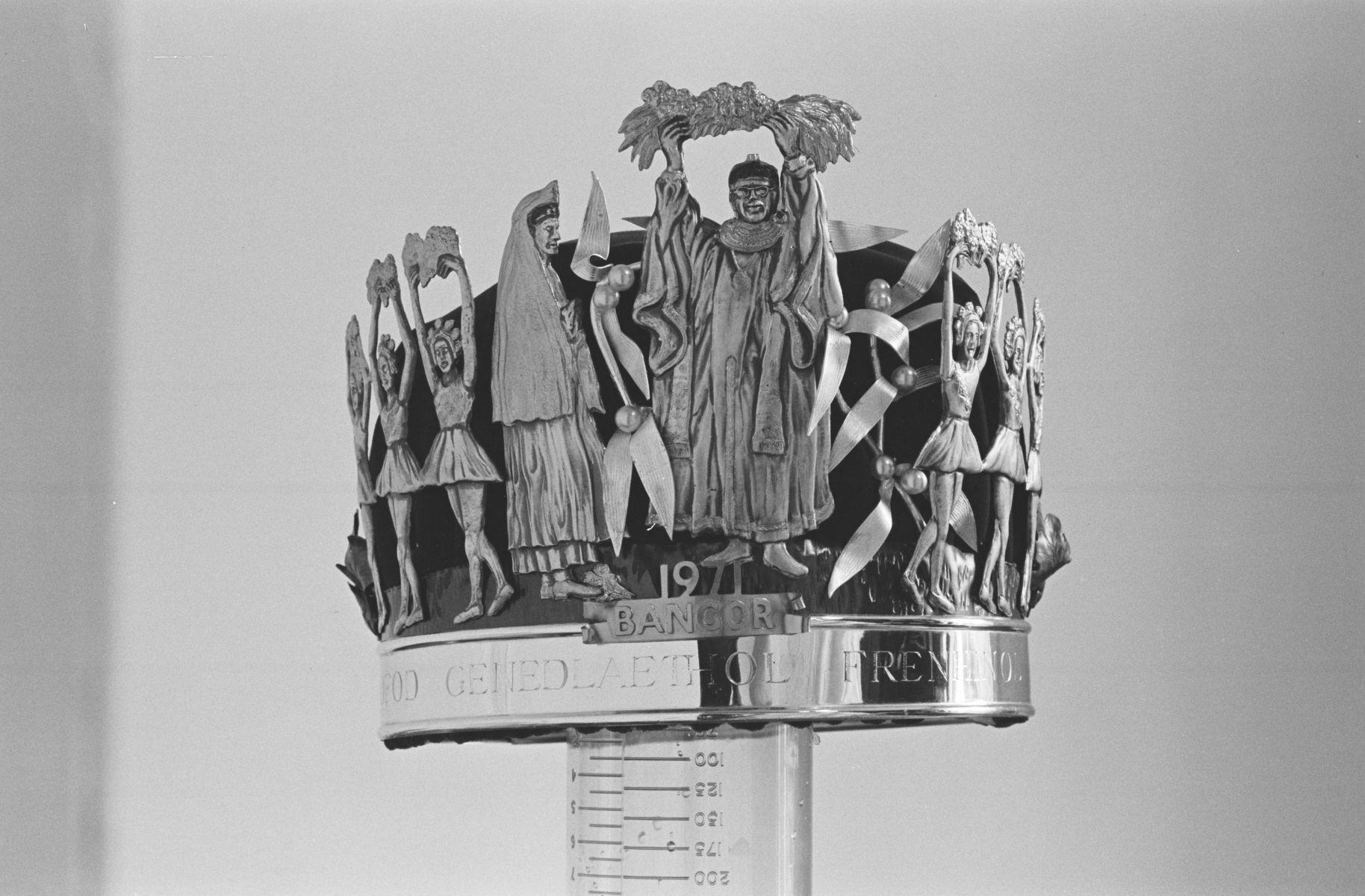
Crown designed for the 1971 National Eisteddfod of Wales

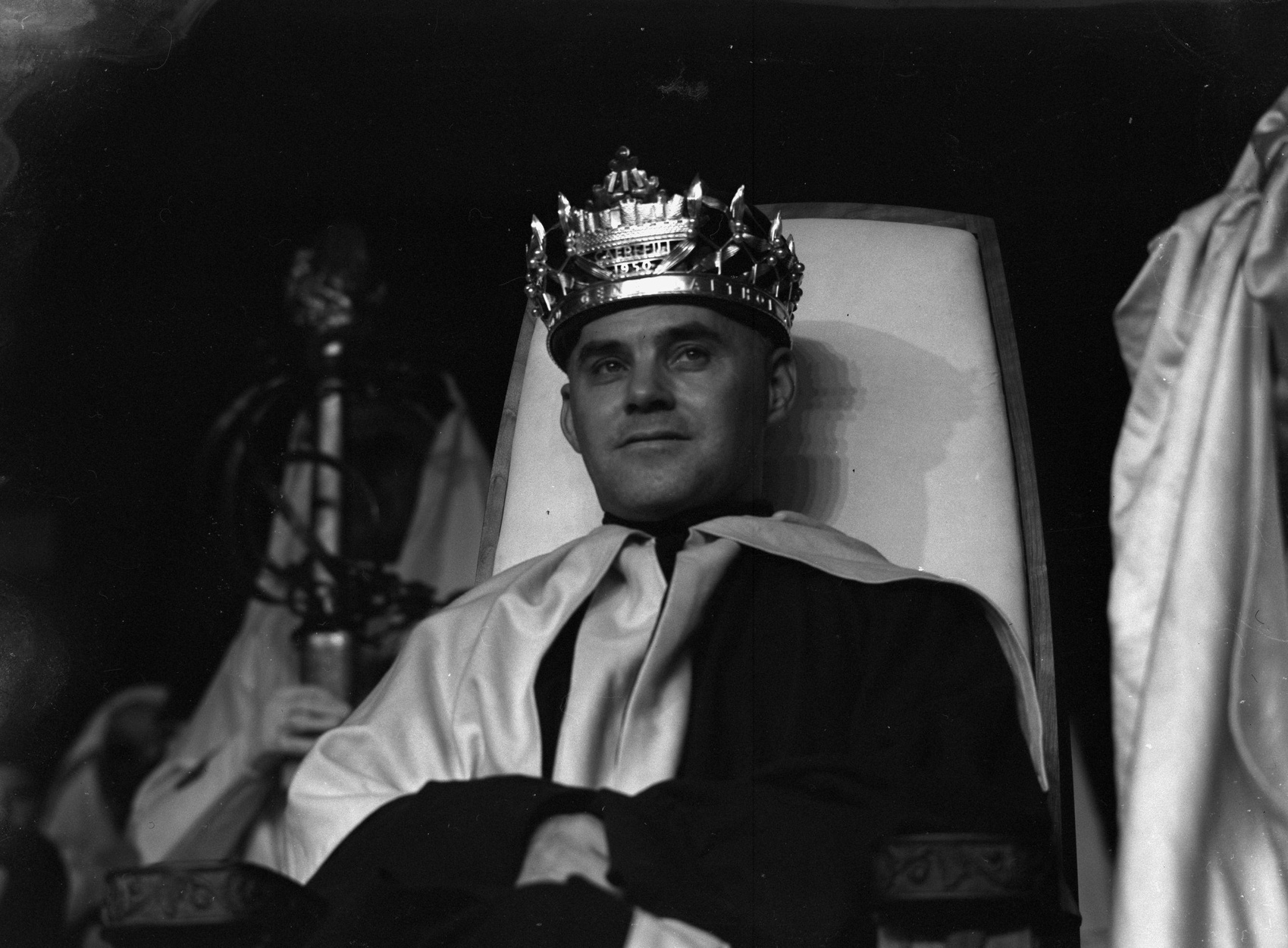
Euros Bowen at the 1950 National Eisteddfod crowning ceremony

The Crowning of the Bard (Welsh: Coroni'r Bardd) is one of the most important events at the National Eisteddfod of Wales.

== National Eisteddfod of Wales ==
The ceremony takes place at the National Eisteddfod of Wales, and is normally on the Monday afternoon of Eisteddfod week (it was formerly held on the Tuesday).

A new bardic crown is specially designed and made for each eisteddfod and is awarded to the winning entrant in a competition for either a pryddest, an extended poem written in free verse, or a collection of poems in free verse (in other words, and more specifically, poetry not written in cynghanedd, whether in metre or vers libre). According to Jan Morris, "When Welsh poets speak of Free Verse, they mean forms like the sonnet or the ode, which obey the same rules as English poesy. Strict Metres verse still honours the complex rules laid down for correct poetic composition 600 years ago."

There are three judges and these have included past crowned bards, such as Mererid Hopwood and T. James Jones.

The National Eisteddfod crown was first awarded in 1867. The crowning ceremony is presided over by the Archdruid, who invites one of the judges to read the adjudication and judges' comments before announcing the identity of the bard, using only the pen name that the winner has used when submitting the work. Up to this point, no one knows the true identity of the bard, who is asked to stand and is then escorted to the stage and crowned.

Winning the "double" of bardic chair and crown at the same Eisteddfod is a feat that has only been achieved a handful of times in the history of the Eisteddfod.

During the 1912 National Eisteddfod at Wrexham, T.H. Parry-Williams achieved a double victory for the first time, a feat he repeated in Bangor 1915. Parry-Williams later recalled returning home to Rhyd-ddu, where had been working as a hired hand on the farm of a relative. Upon telling his employer of his double-victory, Parry-Williams was advised to, "seek grace." When Parry-Williams then informed his employer that both victories had gained him £40, the relative shouted in angry disbelief, "Ac mi gwnest nhw i gyd ar dy din!!!" ('And you earned them all sitting on your arse!!!').

More recently, both Alan Llwyd and Donald Evans have won a double victory twice.

111 people have won the Crown. 16 people have won it twice, as well as 5 men winning it 3 times, and on six occations (1896, 1916, 1939, 1940, 1952, and 1956) no one was "teilwng" and so the crown was not awarded.

At the 1953 Rhyl Eisteddfod Dilys Cadwaladr became the first woman to win the crown, and in total 10 women have won the prize, with Eluned Phillips winning it twice, in 1967 and 1983.

In August 2018 the winner of the crown was awarded to Cardiff author, Catrin Dafydd, though during the ceremony the archdruid, Geraint Llifon, caused controversy by saying she couldn't have achieved this without men. Llifon later apologised.

=== List of Crown winners at the National Eisteddfod of Wales ===
Year	Location	Winner (bardic name)	Subject/title of work
1880	Caernarfon	Ellis Roberts (Elis Wyn o Wyrfai)	Buddugoliaeth y Groes
1881	Merthyr Tydfil	Watkin Wyn	Bywyd
1882	Denbigh	D R Williams	Y Cadfridog Garfield
1883	Cardiff	Anne Thomas (Morfudd Eryri)	Llandaf
1884	Liverpool	J Cadfan Davies (Cadfan)	Madog ab Owain Gwynedd
1885	Aberdare	Tecwyn Parry	Hywel Dda
1886	Caernarfon	J Cadfan Davies (Cadfan)	Cystenin Fawr
1887	London	J Cadfan Davies (Cadfan)	John Penry
1888	Wrexham	H Elvet Lewis (Elfed)	Y Sabath yng Nghymru
1889	Brecon	H Elvet Lewis (Elfed)	Llywelyn Ein Llyw Olaf
1890	Bangor	J J Roberts (Iolo Caernarfon)	Ardderchog Lu'r Merthyri
1891	Swansea	David Adams (Hawen)	Oliver Cromwell
1892	Rhyl	J J Roberts (Iolo Caernarfon)	Dewi Sant
1893	Pontypridd	Ben Davies	Cymru Fydd
1894	Caernarfon	Ben Davies	Tennyson
1895	Llanelli	W L Lewis (Llew Llwyfo)	Ioan y Disgybl Annwyl
1896	Llandudno	No winner	
1897	Newport	Thomas Davies (Mafonwy)	Arthur y Ford Gron
1898	Blaenau Ffestiniog	R Gwylfa Roberts (Gwylfa)	Charles o'r Bala
1899	Cardiff	R Gwylfa Roberts (Gwylfa)	Y Diddanydd Arall
1900	Liverpool	J T Job (Job) Williams	Pantycelyn
1901	Merthyr Tydfil	John Jenkins (Gwili)	Tywysog Tangnefedd
1902	Bangor	Robert Roberts (Silyn)	Trystan ac Esyllt
1903	Llanelli	J E Davies (Rhuddwawr)	Y Ficer Prichard
1904	Rhyl	R M Humphreys (Machno)	Tom Ellis
1905	Mountain Ash	Thomas Davies (Mafonwy)	Ann Griffiths
1906	Caernarfon	Hugh Emyr Davies (Emyr)	Branwen Ferch Llyr
1907	Swansea	John Dyfnallt Owen	Y Greal Sanctaidd
1908	Llangollen	Hugh Emyr Davies (Emyr)	Owain Glyndwr
1909	London	W J Gruffydd	Yr Arglwydd Rhys
1910	Colwyn Bay	William Williams (Crwys)	Ednyfed Fychan
1911	Carmarthen	William Williams (Crwys)	Gwerin Cymru
1912	Wrexham	T H Parry-Williams	Gerallt Gymro
1913	Abergavenny	Wil Ifan	Ieuan Gwynedd
1914	Not held due to First World War	No Eisteddfod	
1915	Bangor	T H Parry-Williams	Y Ddinas
1916	Aberystwyth	No winner	
1917	Birkenhead	Wil Ifan Pwyll	Pendefig Dyfed
1918	Neath	Emrys Lewis	Mynachlog Nedd
1919	Corwen	William Williams (Crwys)	Morgan Llwyd
1920	Barry	James Evans	Trannoeth y Drin
1921	Caernarfon	Albert Evans-Jones (Cynan)	Mab y Bwthyn
1922	Ammanford	R Beynon	Y Tannau Coll
1923	Mold	Albert Evans-Jones (Cynan)	Yr Ynys Unig
1924	Pontypool	Prosser Rhys	Atgof
1925	Pwllheli	Wil Ifan Bro Fy Mebyd	
1926	Swansea	Dewi Emrys	Casgliad o farddoniaeth wreiddiol
1927	Holyhead	Caradog Prichard	Y Briodas
1928	Treorchy	Caradog Prichard	Penyd
1929	Liverpool	Caradog Prichard	Y Gân Ni Chanwyd
1930	Llanelli	Gwilym Myrddin	Ben Bowen
1931	Bangor	Albert Evans-Jones (Cynan)	Y Dyrfa
1932	Aberafan	Eirug Davies	A Ddioddefw a Orfu
1933	Wrexham	Simon B Jones	Rownd yr Horn
1934	Neath	Eirug Davies Y Gorwel	
1935	Caernarfon	Gwilym R Jones	Ynys Enlli
1936	Fishguard	David Jones	Yr Anialwch
1937	Machynlleth	J M Edwards	Y Pentref
1938	Cardiff	Edgar Thomas	Peniel
1939	Denbigh	No winner	
1940	Mountain Ash (radio)	No winner	
1941	Old Colwyn	J M Edwards	Peiriannau
1942	Cardigan	Herman Jones	Ebargofiant
1943	Bangor	Dafydd Owen	Rhosydd Moab
1944	Llandybie	J M Edwards	Yr Aradr
1945	Rhos	Griffith John Roberts	Coed Celyddon
1946	Mountain Ash	Rhydwen Williams	Yr Arloeswr
1947	Colwyn Bay	Griffith John Roberts	Glyn y Groes
1948	Bridgend	Euros Bowen	O'r Dwyrain
1949	Dolgellau	John Eilian	Meirionnydd
1950	Caerphilly	Euros Bowen	Difodiant
1951	Llanrwst	T Glyn Davies	Adfeilion
1952	Aberystwyth	No winner	
1953	Rhyl	Dilys Cadwaladr	Y Llen
1954	Ystradgynlais	E Llwyd Williams	Y Bannau
1955	Pwllheli	W J Gruffydd (Elerydd)	Ffenestri
1956	Aberdare	No winner	
1957	Llangefni	Dyfnallt Morgan	Drama Fydryddol Rhwng Dau
1958	Ebbw Vale	Llewelyn Jones	Cymod
1959	Caernarfon	Tom Huws	Cadwynau
1960	Cardiff	W J Gruffydd (Elerydd)	Unigedd
1961	Rhosllanerchrugog	L Haydn Lewis	Ffoadur
1962	Llanelli	D Emlyn Lewis	Y Cwmwl
1963	Llandudno	Tom Parri-Jones	Y Bont
1964	Swansea	Parch Rhydwen Williams	Ffynhonnau
1965	Newtown	Tom Parri-Jones	Y Gwybed
1966	Aberafan	Dafydd Jones	Y Clawdd
1967	Bala	Eluned Phillips	Corlannau
1968	Barry	Rev Haydn Lewis	Meini
1969	Flint	Dafydd Rowlands	I Gwestiynau fy Mab
1970	Ammanford	Bryan Martyn Davies	Darluniau ar Gynfas
1971	Bangor	Bryan Martyn Davies	Y Golau Caeth
1972	Haverfordwest	Rev Dafydd Rowlands	Dadeni
1973	Ruthin	Alan Llwyd	Y Dref
1974	Carmarthen	W R P George	Tân
1975	Criccieth	Elwyn Roberts	Dilyniant o gerdd Pridd
1976	Cardigan	Alan Llwyd	Dilyniant o benillion Troeon Bywyd
1977	Wrexham	Donald Evans	Hil
1978	Cardiff	Sion Eirian	Cerdd hir yn portreadu llencyndod
1979	Caernarfon	Meirion Evans	Dilyniant o Gerddi Serch neu Siom
1980	Lliw Valley	Donald Evans	Dilyniant o Gerddi
1981	Machynlleth	Sion Aled	Wynebau
1982	Swansea	Eirwyn George	Dilyniant o Gerddi
1983	Anglesey	Eluned Phillips	Clymau
1984	Lampeter	John Roderick Rees	Llygaid
1985	Rhyl	John Roderick Rees	Glannau
1986	Fishguard	T James Jones	Llwch
1987	Porthmadog	John Gruffydd Jones	Casgliad o Gerddi
1988	Newport	T James Jones	Ffin
1989	Llanrwst	Selwyn Griffith	Dilyniant o Gerddi
1990	Rhymney Valley	Iwan Llwyd	Gwreichion
1991	Mold	Einir Jones	Pelydrau
1992	Aberystwyth	Cyril Jones	Cyfrannu
1993	Llanelwedd	Eirwyn George	Llynnoedd
1994	Neath	Gerwyn Williams	Dolenni
1995	Abergele	Aled Gwyn	Melodïau
1996	Llandeilo	David John Pritchard	Olwynion
1997	Bala	Cen Williams	Branwen
1998	Bridgend	Emyr Lewis	Rhyddid
1999	Anglesey	Ifor ap Glyn	Golau yn y Gwyll
2000	Llanelli	Dylan Iorwerth	Tywod
2001	Denbigh	Penri Roberts	Muriau
2002	St David's	Aled Jones Williams	Awelon
2003	Meifod	Mererid Hopwood	Gwreiddiau
2004	Newport	Jason Walford Davies	Egni
2005	Snowdonia	Christine James	Llinellau Lliw
2006	Swansea	Eigra Lewis Roberts	Fflam
2007	Flintshire	Tudur Dylan Jones	Copaon
2008	Cardiff	Hywel Meilyr Griffiths	Stryd Pleser
2009	Meirion	Ceri Wyn Jones	Yn y Gwaed
2010	Blaenau Gwent and heads of the valleys	Glenys Mair Glyn Roberts	Newid
2011	Wrexham	Geraint Lloyd Owen	Gwythiennau
2012	Vale of Glamorgan	Gwyneth Lewis	Ynys
2013	Denbighshire	Ifor ap Glyn	Terfysg
2014	Carmarthenshire	Guto Dafydd	Tyfu
2015	Montgomery and borderlands	Manon Rhys	Breuddwyd
2016	Monmouthshire and district	Elinor Gwynn (Carreg Lefn)	Llwybrau
2017	Anglesey	Gwion Hallam	Trwy'r Drych
2018	Cardiff	Catrin Dafydd (Yma)	Olion
2019	Llanrwst	Guto Dafydd	Cilfachau
2020	Not held due to the COVID-19 pandemic	No Eisteddfod	
2021	"Eisteddfod AmGen"	Dyfan Lewis	Ar Wahân
2022	Tregaron	Esyllt Maelor—Gwres	
2023	Boduan	Rhys Iorwerth (Gregor)	
2024	Rhondda Cynon Taf	Gwynfor Dafydd (Samsa)	
2025	Wrexham	Owain Rhys (Llif 2)	
2026	Pembrokeshire	Martin Huws (Fan[-]go)	Adnabod

== See also ==
- Chairing of the Bard
- Crown of the Urdd National Eisteddfod
- Welsh Poetry Competition
