= Elinor Gwynn =

Elinor Gwynn is a Welsh poet and environmentalist.

She studied zoology and botany, then specialised in environmental law.

Gwynn's poetry is known for being heavily inflected by her love for the outdoors. According to the poet, personal tragedy also heavily inspired her work.

She came close to winning the poetry competition at the 2012 National Eisteddfod of Wales.

At the 2016 National Eisteddfod of Wales she won the Eisteddfod Crown for her poetry.

In 2025 Gwynn collaborated with artist Lowri Davies to produce an exhibition of ceramic portraits of seven women living in Wales. The exhibition took place at the Mission Gallery in Swansea in July and August 2025.

== See also ==
- Catrin Dafydd
