= 2022 Ceredigion National Eisteddfod =

2022 eisteddfod in Tregaron, Wales

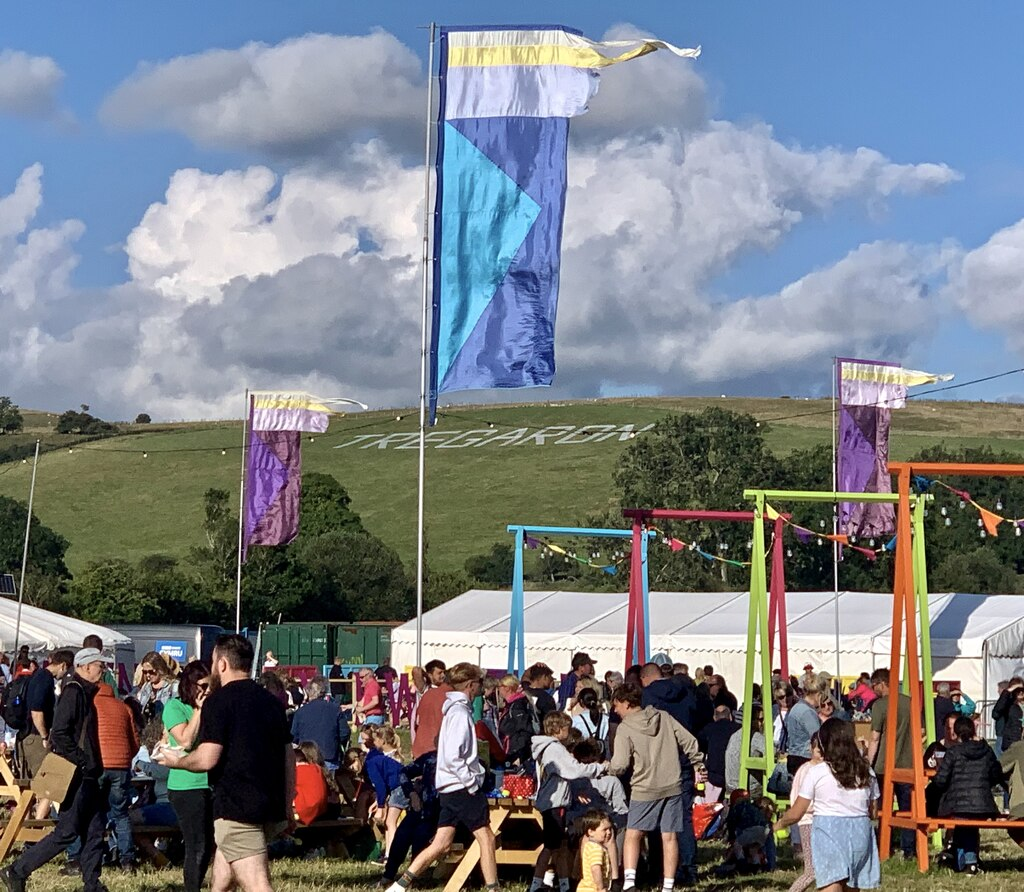
- The 2022 Maes at Tregaron, Ceredigion
- Native name: Eisteddfod Genedlaethol Ceredigion 2022
- Date: 30 July 2024 – 6 August 2022
- Duration: 8 days
- Location: Tregaron; 52.2279°N 3.9349°W
- Theme: Welsh language and culture
- ← 2021 AmGen 2023 Llŷn and Eifionydd →

The 2022 Ceredigion National Eisteddfod of Wales (Welsh: Eisteddfod Genedlaethol Cymru Ceredigion 2022) was held in the town of Tregaron, Ceredigion, Wales, from 30 July to 6 August 2022. Prior to the event taking place, the full National Eisteddfod of Wales had been postponed for two years in a row, due to the problems of the COVID-19 pandemic.

== Background ==
The modern National Eisteddfod of Wales has been held every year (with the exception of 1914, 2020 and 2021) since 1861. It is hosted by a different region of Wales each year. Around 1,000 events and 200 competitions are held, in poetry, music, dance, drama and literature, giving it a claim to be probably the largest music and poetry festival in Europe. The main competition events are the Crowning of the Bard and the Chairing of the Bard.

The full National Eisteddfod was postponed in 2020 and again in 2021 because of COVID-19 restrictions. In August 2021 an Eisteddfod AmGen ('Alternative Eisteddfod') was held virtually (and at the BBC's studios) in its place.

The 2022 Ceredigion Eisteddfod was the first time it had been held in that county since 1992 (when it had taken place in Aberystwyth). 2022 was the first time it had been held in Tregaron.

== Preparations ==
The proclamation ceremony for the Ceredigion National Eisteddfod took place on Saturday 29 June 2019 in the town of Cardigan, announcing the intention to hold the event the following year. A procession took place through the town to Ysgol Uwchradd Aberteifi, where the new Archdruid of the Gorsedd, Myrddin ap Dafydd, led the ceremony. Members of local band, Ail Symudiad, then played one of their songs dressed in the Gorsedd costume. It was believed to be the first time an electric guitar had been played live during a proclamation ceremmony.

The Ceredigion Eisteddfod was originally planned for August 2020 but, following the UK lockdown because of the COVID-19 pandemic, in March 2020 it was announced the event had to be postponed until August 2021. In January 2021, following discussions with the Welsh Government and Public Health Wales, a further decision was made to postpone the National Eisteddfod again, to August 2022. The organising team was halved in size.

Coronavirus restrictions were eased in Wales on 7 August 2021, allowing the Eisteddfod organisers to begin to develop plans for a full scale National Eisteddfod to take place in August 2022.

With Tregaron thought to be the smallest market town in Wales, special arrangements had to be made for vehicular access. A one-way system was put in place around the town and a 6,000 space car park was created. A large caravan camping site was also created.

15,000 free tickets were made available for disadvantaged children and refugees. Free tickets were also made available for every primary school aged child in Ceredigion.

== 2022 location ==
The main Maes (the Eisteddfod's showground) was sited in fields of a dairy farm, immediately to the north of Tregaron (Ceredigion Council were criticised by the National Farmers' Union for only offering oat milk smoothies at their Pentre Ceredigion stand on the site).

Temporary buildings and locations on the Maes included the main Pavilion, where the music, drama, dancing, and poetry competitions and prize-giving ceremonies took place. Y Lle Celf held exhibitions of art, craft and design.

Performances by musicians and bands took place on the Llwyfan y Maes ('Maes Stage') while Maes B took place in a separate field for late night gigs.

== Main awards ==
The main prizes of the National Eisteddfod, the specially designed Chair and the Crown, were revealed to the Executive Committee at a ceremony in Tregaron at the end of June 2022.

=== Chairing of the Bard ===
The 2022 Eisteddfod Chair was designed and created by Rees Thomas, made of oak with the design on the chair's back comprising the three-line 'Mystic Mark', an image of a red kite, and 'Ceredigion' in the bardic alphabet. The Chair was won by former college lecturer Llŷr Gwyn Lewis, who submitted under the pen name 'Cnwt Gwirion', for his collection of cynghanedd poetry under the title "Traeth". There were fourteen entries into the 2022 competition, the highest number for over 30 years.

=== Crowning of the Bard ===
The 2022 Eisteddfod Crown was designed and created by Richard Molineux, with a series of 12 painted glass 'facades' around the circumference, picturing cultural images of Ceredigion. There were 24 entries into the free verse poetry competition, with the Crown being awarded to Esyllt Maelor of Morfa Nefyn. Maelor used the pen name of 'Samiwel'.

=== Daniel Owen Memorial Medal ===
There were 14 entries for the Daniel Owen Memorial Medal, awarded for an unpublished novel of at least 50,000 words. The 2022 winner was Meinir Pierce Jones, for her novel "Capten" ('Captain').

=== Prose Medal ===
There were 17 entries for the Prose Medal, which the judges awarded to 24 year-old Sioned Erin Hughes under her pen name of 'Mesen'. She wrote a series of stories under the title "Rhyngom" ('Between Us').

=== Drama Medal ===
The Drama Medal was awarded to Gruffydd Siôn Ywain of Dolgellau, who submitted under the pen name 'Dy Fam'. He was one of 15 entries into the competition. His winning work was called "Nyth" ('Nest') and portrayed a male couple looking to find a surrogate mother to start a family.

=== Gold Medals ===
Gold medals are awarded to exhibitors at the Eisteddfod's art and design exhibition, Y Lle Celf. The 2022 winners were:

- Gold Medal for Craft and Design - The £5000 prize was won by Cardiff sculptor, Natalie Dias, who created a series of heads of soldiers from mythology and legend in geometric forms
- Gold Medal for Fine Art - The £5000 prize was won by Ceredigion animator, Seán Vicary, for his video "Sitelines" which responded to Alan Garner's novel "The Owl Service"
- Gold Medal for Architecture - The medal was not awarded this year because the standard was not high enough, though the National Eisteddfod Architecture Scholarship was awarded to Machynlleth architect Sonia Cunningham.

== See also ==
- 2018 Cardiff National Eisteddfod
- 2024 Rhondda Cynon Taf National Eisteddfod
- 2025 Wrexham National Eisteddfod
