= Geraint Lloyd Owen =

Welsh poet

Geraint Lloyd Owen (born 15 May 1941) is a Welsh-language poet, also known by his bardic name Geraint Llifon. He is a retired head teacher and was the Archdruid of the Gorsedd between 2016 and 2019.

He was born in a farmhouse between Llandderfel and Sarnau, Meirionnydd, before moving to his mother's family home in Sarnau village. He attended the local school, then Ysgol Tŷ-tan-domen, Bala, and trained as a secondary-school teacher at the Heath College, Cardiff. He taught at Machynlleth.

He won numerous local eisteddfod chairs, including Pontrhydfendigaid, Lampeter, Gŵyl Fawr Aberteifi (Cardigan), Powys and the Urdd. He was head teacher of Ysgol y Ffôr, Pwllheli, and Ysgol Treferthyr, Cricieth, before taking early retirement in order to run Siop y Pentan in Caernarfon.

He won the Crown in The National Eisteddfod of Wales (Wrecsam and District) 2011.

Lloyd Owen became Archdruid, having been appointed in July 2015. His tenure as Archdruid started in 2016 and was to last for three years, 2016 - 2019.

In August 2018 Llifon caused controversy when he suggested the winner of the bardic crown at the Cardiff National Eisteddfod, Catrin Dafydd, couldn't have achieved this without men. He later apologised.

He was succeeded as Archdruid by Myrddin ap Dafydd.

Lloyd Owen's brother was the Prifardd Gerallt Lloyd Owen.

Preceded by Christine James	Archdderwydd of the National Eisteddfod of Wales; 2016–2019	Succeeded by Myrddin ap Dafydd
