= Catrin Dafydd =

Welsh author

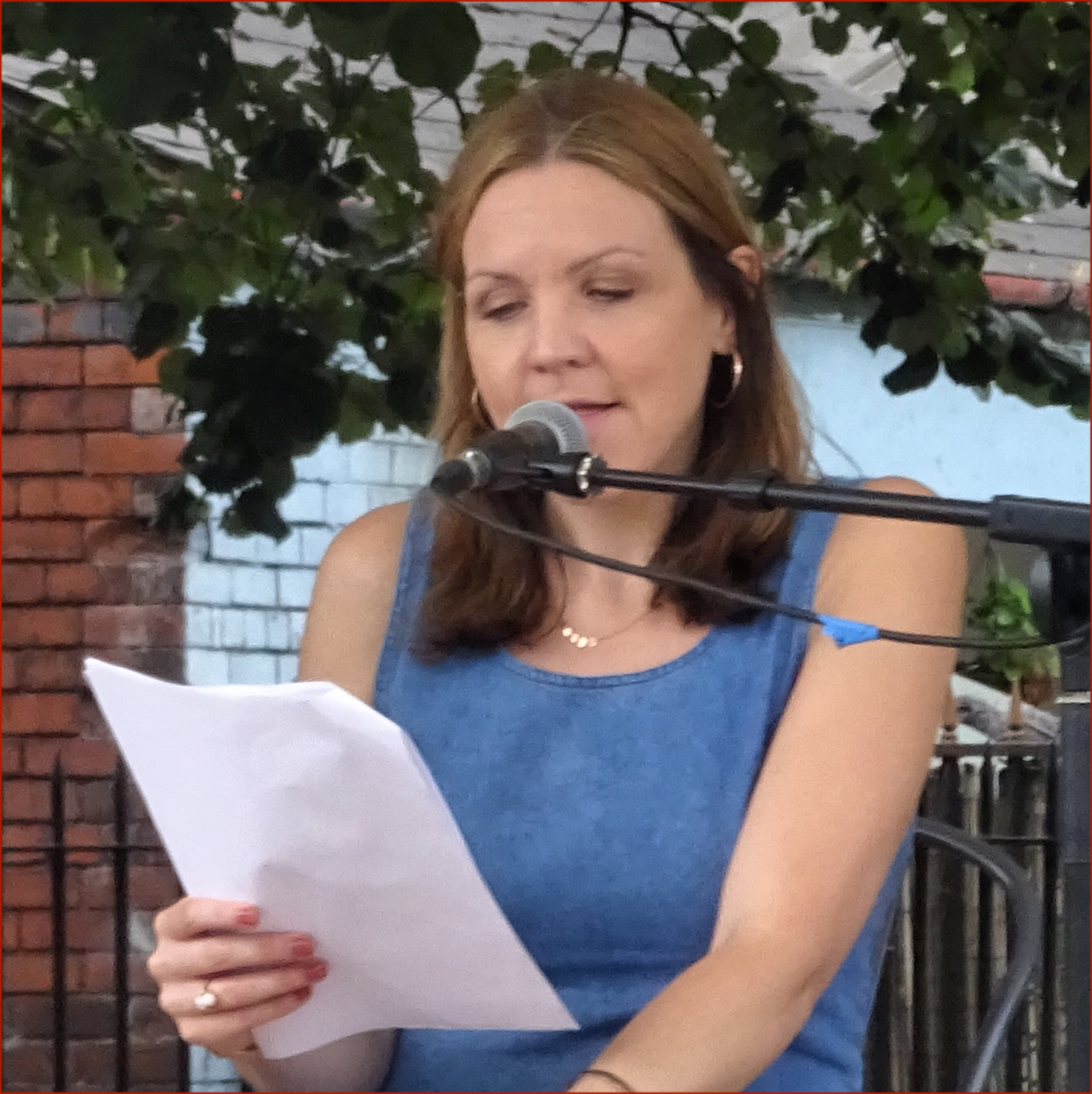
Catrin Dafydd at the 2018 National Eisteddfod

Catrin Dafydd (born c. 1982) is a Welsh author, scriptwriter and poet, who was awarded the Crown at the 2018 National Eisteddfod of Wales.

== Background ==
Dafydd is of a Welsh language family from Gwaelod y Garth, near Cardiff and attended her local Welsh-medium school Ysgol Gyfun Gymraeg Rhydfelen (now Ysgol Garth Olwg) in the Pontypridd area. She graduated with a degree in Welsh from the University of Aberystwyth.

== Work ==
Dafydd's first Welsh-language novel, Pili Pala, was published in 2006 and her first English-language novel, Random Deaths and Custard, in 2007.

She co-wrote the television drama Ar y Tracs in 2009. She later became one of the writers for the S4C soap opera, Pobol y Cwm.

In August 2018, Dafydd won the Crown at the National Eisteddfod of Wales, in Cardiff Bay, for a poetry collection on the theme of Olion (Traces), exploring Welshness in the Grangetown area of Cardiff. Archdruid Geraint Llifon caused argument at the award ceremony by claiming that Dafydd could not have achieved her win without men. He later apologised.

== Politics ==
Dafydd is a supporter of Welsh independence and stated on the Yes is more website that "We are the people best able to make decisions about ourselves. Independence would give us agency, would give our communities sovereignty – would give us the freedom to choose how we want to live our short lives!"

== See also ==
- Elinor Gwynn
