= Gwion Hallam =

Welsh children's writer

Gwion Hallam is a Welsh writer and television presenter from Ammanford, Carmarthenshire. He now lives with his family in Y Felinheli, North Wales. His brother, Tudur Hallam, won the chair at the National Eisteddfod in 2010 and 2025.

His book, Creadyn, won the 2006 Best Welsh-Language Book (Secondary Sector) in the Tir na n-Og awards. In 2017, he won the Crown at the National Eisteddfod of Wales.

He regularly presents the hymn-singing programme Dechrau Canu, Dechrau Canmol on S4C.
