= Tudur Hallam =

Welsh academic and poet

Tudur Hallam (born c. 1975) is a Welsh poet and academic from Ammanford, Carmarthenshire. He has won the Chair at the National Eisteddfod of Wales twice, in 2010 and 2025.

== Early life ==
Hallam was born in Morriston, Swansea, but grew up in Penybanc near Ammanford, Carmarthenshire. He went to school at Ysgol Gyfun Maes-yr-Yrfa in Cefneithin. He is the brother of writer Gwion Hallam. He went on to study at Aberystwyth University.

== Poetry ==
Hallam had been writing poetry since the sixth form. While at university he won the Chair at the Inter-collegiate Eisteddfod twice, for his cynghanedd poetry. He went on to win the Prose Medal at the Urdd National Eisteddfod in 1995, followed by the Urdd Chair in 1999.

After two unsuccessful attempts, in August 2010 Hallam won the Chair at the National Eisteddfod of Wales in Ebbw Vale. The subject of his cynghanedd poetry was Ennill Tir ('Gaining Ground').

At the 2025 National Eisteddfod in Wrexham, Hallam won the Chair for a second time. On the subject of Dinas ('City') he wrote about coaching a girls football team and, following their victory against a city team, he describes going to Glangwili Hospital to receive a cancer diagnosis. One of the judges described the work as "raw" and "unlike any other awdl or poem I’ve seen win the Chair or the Crown at the National Eisteddfod".

Hallam published a volume of poetry, Parcio, in 2019. Following his 2025 victory, in February 2026 he published a second volume, Y Golau y Gadair ('The Lights of the Chair').

== University career ==
In 1999 Hallam took on an academic post at Swansea University's Welsh Department. He became Head of the Department of Welsh and a professor engaged in teaching and research. He retired on health grounds in 2025. In December 2025 the university awarded him with an Honorary Doctor of Letters.

== Personal life ==
Hallam is married and has three children, Garan, Bedo and Edwy. He lives in Foelgastell, Carmarthenshire.
