= 2024 Rhondda Cynon Taf National Eisteddfod =

2024 eisteddfod in Pontypridd, Wales

- Part of the National Eisteddfod
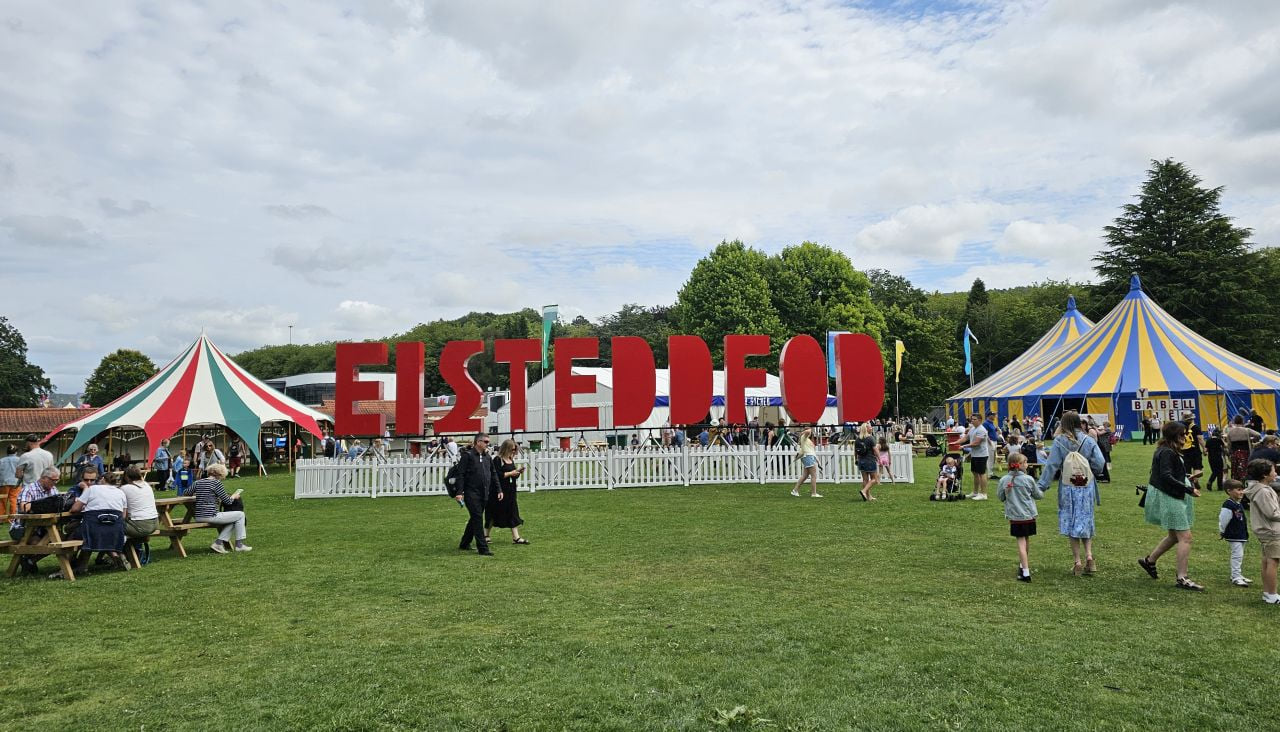
- The Maes in Ynysangharad Park, Pontypridd
- Location map
- Native name: Eisteddfod Genedlaethol Rhondda Cynon Taf 2024
- Date: 3–10 August 2024
- Duration: 8 days
- Venue: Ynysangharad Park and other venues in the town
- Location: Pontypridd; 51.6008°N 3.3362°W
- Theme: Welsh language and culture
- ← 2023 Llŷn and Eifionydd 2025 Wrexham →

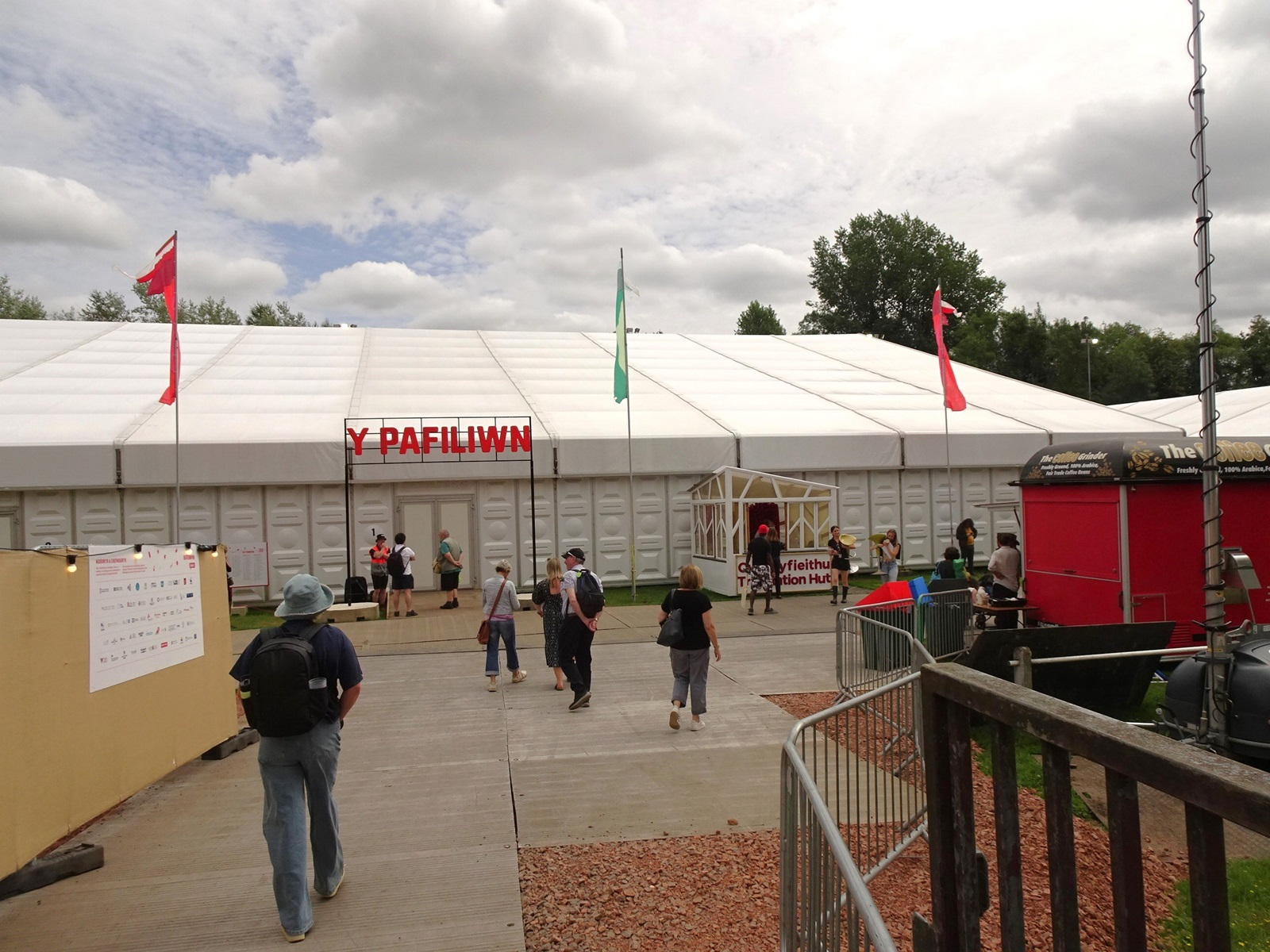
Main Pavilion in Ynysangharad Park

The 2024 Rhondda Cynon Taf National Eisteddfod (Welsh: Eisteddfod Genedlaethol Cymru Rhondda Cynon Taf 2024) was held in Pontypridd and across the Rhondda Cynon Taf valleys, Wales, from 3 to 10 August 2024. This marked the first time the National Eisteddfod of Wales had been held in the area since 1956. The 2024 event attracted over 186,000 attendees and was also described as "the greenest Eisteddfod ever".

== Background ==
The modern National Eisteddfod of Wales has been held every year (with the exception of 1914, 2020 and 2021) since 1861. It is hosted by a different region of Wales each year. Around 1,000 events and 200 competitions are held, in poetry, music, dance, drama and literature, making it one of Europe's largest music and poetry festivals. The main competition events are the Crowning of the Bard and the Chairing of the Bard.

The 2024 Rhondda Cynon Taf Eisteddfod was the first time it had been held in that area since 1956, when it had been staged in Aberdare and District. It had last been held in Pontypridd in 1893.

In 2019 it was announced the 2022 National Eisteddfod would be held in Rhondda Cynon Taf. However, the 2020 and 2021 National Eisteddfods were postponed due to the COVID-19 pandemic. The Rhondda Cynon Taf event was pushed back to 2024.

== Proclamation ==
The proclamation ceremony for the 2024 National Eisteddfod took place on the 24 June 2023 in Aberdare, formally announcing the intention to hold the next National Eisteddfod in Rhondda Cynon Taf. The ceremony included a procession of local organisations and members of the Gorsedd through the town. At the Ron Jones Stadium poems were read (including by local celebrity Roy Noble) before the Rhestr Testunau (the list of competitions to take place in 2024) was presented to the Archdruid. A front row seat was given to the last surviving member of the General Committee of the 1956 Aberdare National Eisteddfod, 94-year-old Elfed Davies.

== Preparations ==
Preparations for fundraising events began in December 2021. A strategy to engage young people with the Eisteddfod was put forward. Funding was successfully agreed from the National Lottery Heritage Fund.

In early March 2023, a launch event for the Eisteddfod took place at The Lion pub in Treorchy. The all-day event included street theatre, a poetry competition, a comedy club and music by Welsh rock group, Candelas.

The intention to hold the 2024 National Eisteddfod in Pontypridd was announced at a ceremony on 7 August 2023, at the 2023 National Eisteddfod in Boduan, Gwynedd. Organisers described the 2024 Eisteddfod as "an urban, alternative and exciting Eisteddfod" using Ynysangharad Park utilising Ynysangharad Park and various town centre venues.

Prior to the event, £332,000 had been raised to fund the Eisteddfod. This figure grew to £450,000 with the help of additional support from Rhondda Cynon Taf County Borough Council.

Phased closure of Ynysangharad Park took place between 24 June and 30 July 2024 to allow preparation of the site.

== 2024 locations ==
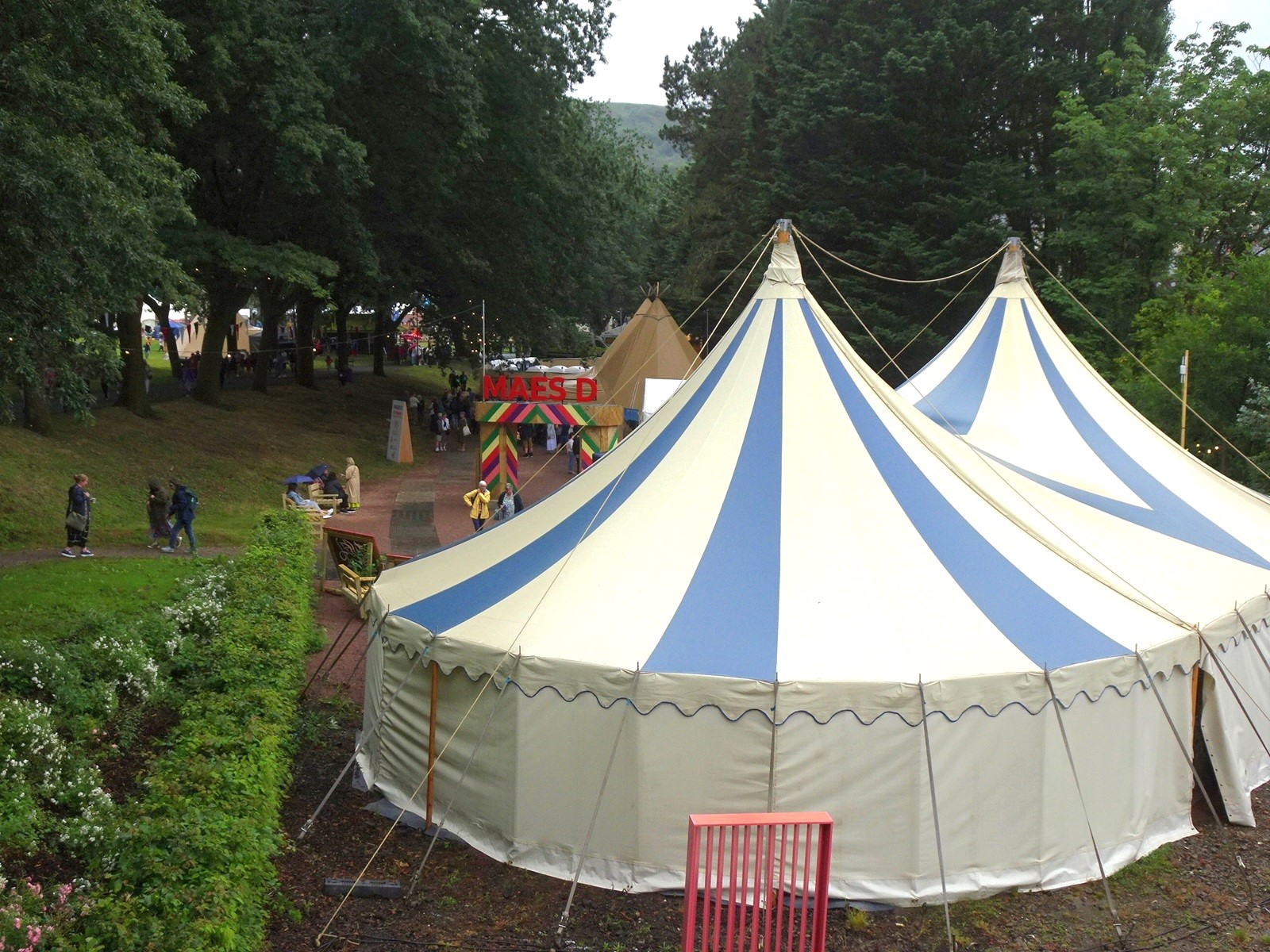
Learners' Tent (Maes D) in the park

The main Maes (the Eisteddfod's showground) was located in Ynysangharad War Memorial Park. The park was a short walk from Pontypridd railway station and bus station, providing convenient public transport access. With the River Taff flowing around part of the site, access to the Maes was managed through footbridges from the town centre. Pontypridd's outdoor lido remained open but only bookable by ticket-holders to the Eisteddfod.

Adult daily entrance charges to the Maes ranged from £12.00 to £23.00, with reduced prices for those arriving after 6pm.

Ten different stages were located in Ynysangharad Park and in the town centre. Temporary buildings and tents were erected in the park including the Main Pavilion, Literary Pavilion (Y Babell Lên), Arts Village (primarily Y Lle Celf), Science and Technology Village, Welsh Learners’ Village, Ty Gwerin (Folk Tent), Caffi Maes B, stalls and food outlets.

Some theatrical performances took place at Yma building (former YMCA) in the town. Preliminary competitions and some evening performances took place at the Muni Centre in Pontypridd.

Maes B, the after-dark music event with more than 30 Welsh language bands and performers, took place on the outskirts of Pontypridd, a 25 minute walk from the railway station.

A 'fringe' event with live music and guest speakers also took place at Zucco's cafe in Mill Street.

== Events across the valleys ==
While the main Maes was centred in Pontypridd, the 2024 Eisteddfod embraced its regional character with events spanning across the Rhondda Cynon Taf valleys. Council planning documents indicated that "Council and privately owned land/facilities" throughout the county were utilised for wider Eisteddfod events, reflecting the festival's return to "this working-class area in the South Wales valleys" for the first time in almost 70 years.

ARFOR programme events took place at Pentre, including discussions on Welsh language economic initiatives and workshops on "Welsh speaking workplaces." The economic impact was designed to benefit "town centres across Rhondda Cynon Taf," acknowledging the festival's role in supporting the broader regional economy.

== Main awards ==
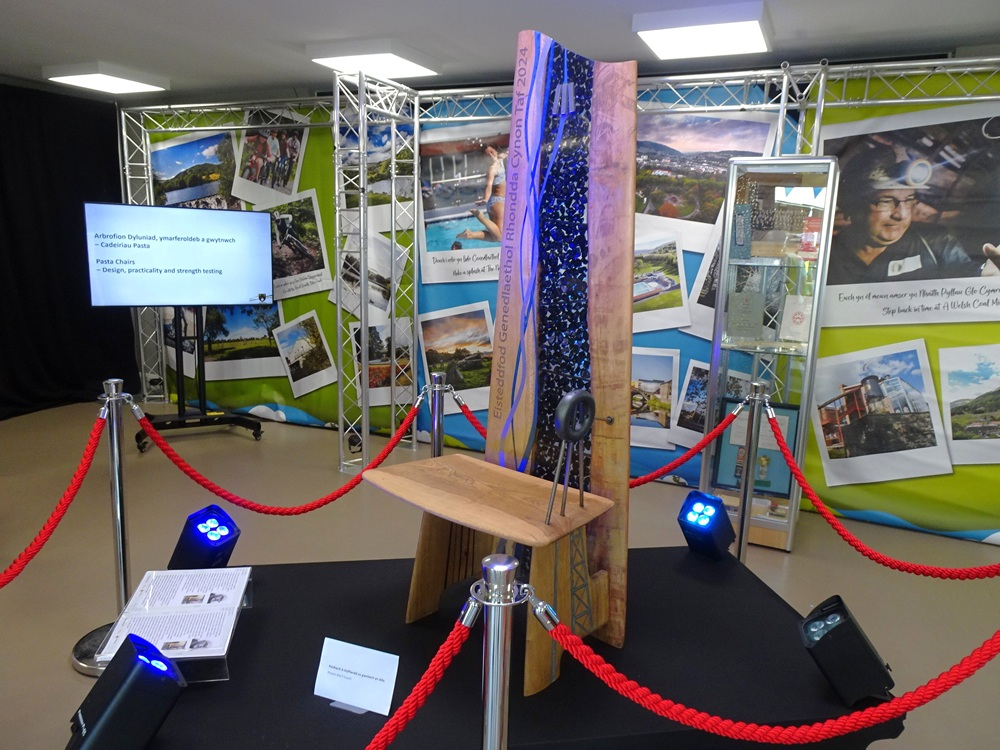
2024 Eisteddfod Chair

=== Chairing of the Bard ===
The 2024 Eisteddfod Chair was designed and created by Berian Daniel, with help from pupils at Ysgol Llanhari, who came up with the idea of a river of coal to represent the area's three rivers and its industrial past.

The Chair was won by 28-year-old ITV journalist Carwyn Eckley, writing under the pen name Brynmair, for his collection of cynghanedd poetry, which explored his experience of losing his father when Eckley was still a small child.

=== Crowning of the Bard ===
The 2024 Eisteddfod Crown was designed and created by Elan Rhys Rowlands, who worked with pupils at Ysgol Garth Olwg near Pontypridd, to develop ideas for the design.

Gwynfor Dafydd, a former pupil of nearby Ysgol Llanhari, was awarded the Crown for his collection of free verse poetry. Dafydd, writing under the pen name Samsa, explored his gay relationship with another man and also his relationship to the South Wales valleys.

=== Prose Medal ===
The prose Medal, for a work of creative prose not exceeding 40,000 words, was awarded to Eurgain Haf who wrote under the nome de plume of Manaia. Her novel Morfarch Arian (Silver Seahorse) has a family of four with mental health issues as its subject. Fourteen entries were received in total for the competition.

=== Daniel Owen Memorial Medal ===
Only five novels of more than 50,000 words were entered into the 2024 competition, none of them ready for publication. It was decided not to award the medal this year, the first time this had happened since 2017.

=== Drama Medal ===
It was announced on the afternoon of 8 August that the Drama Medal wouldn't be awarded that evening. The judging panel had decided to withhold the competition. No further explanation was made.

=== Gold Medals ===
Gold medals are awarded to exhibitors at the Eisteddfod's art and design exhibition, Y Lle Celf. The 2024 winners were:

- Gold Medal for Craft and Design - Textile artist Laura Thomas, from Ewenny near Bridgend, won the Gold Medal for her six woven artworks
- Gold Medal for Fine Art - Brynaman metal artist, Angharad Pearce Jones, received the Gold Medal for her two large installations, one of which formed the entrance to the exhibition.
- Gold Medal for Architecture - Architects Claire Priest and Ben Crawley from Studio Brassica won the Gold Medal, for their refurbishment of an Arts and Crafts stable near Raglan into a family home.

== Gorsedd of Bards ==
Forty-nine people were honoured by the Gorsedd of Bards for their contributions to Wales and/or the Welsh language. They were invested into either the blue or green robes during a special ceremony at the Eisteddfod.

== Attendance ==
The 2024 National Eisteddfod attracted 186,000 visitors and was described as the "greenest Eisteddfod ever". 100,000 visitor journeys passed through Pontypridd railway station and 40,000 people arriving by car used the park-and-ride facilities.

== See also ==
- 2018 Cardiff National Eisteddfod
- 2022 Ceredigion National Eisteddfod
- 2025 Wrexham National Eisteddfod
