= Eisteddfod AmGen 2021 =

2021 virtual eisteddfod in Wales

- Part of the National Eisteddfod of Wales
- Date: 31 July – 7 August 2021
- Duration: 8 days
- Location: BBC Cardiff
- Type: Virtual
- Theme: Welsh language and culture
- ← Gŵyl AmGen 2020 2022 Ceredigion →

The Eisteddfod AmGen 2021 (Welsh for '2021 Alternative Eisteddfod') was an alternative National Eisteddfod of Wales which took place in August 2021, as a consequence of restrictions imposed during the 2020–2021 COVID-19 pandemic. The full National Eisteddfod had been planned to take place in Tregaron, Ceredigion, but had been postponed for a second year in a row, with it to be held in 2022 instead. The Eisteddfod AmGen events were available on television, radio, and online.

== Background ==
The National Eisteddfod of Wales had been held every year since 1861, with the exception of 1914 because of World War I. It is hosted by a different region of Wales each year. Around 1,000 events and 200 competitions are held, in poetry, music, dance, drama and literature, giving it a claim to be probably the largest music and poetry festival in Europe. The main competition events are the Crowning of the Bard and the Chairing of the Bard.

A full National Eisteddfod in Tregaron, Ceredigion, was planned for August 2020 but, following the UK lockdown because of the COVID-19 pandemic, in March 2020 it was announced the event had to be postponed until August 2021. In January 2021, following discussions with the Welsh Government and Public Health Wales, a further decision was made to postpone the National Eisteddfod festival again, to August 2022.

In 2020 as an alternative to the National Eisteddfod, Gŵyl AmGen ('Alternative Festival') was held between May and August, including a long weekend in August broadcast on BBC Radio Cymru.

== 2021 locations ==
The Eisteddfod AmGen took place over the first week of August, the week the National Eisteddfod is normally held each year.

The main Gorsedd of the Bards ceremonies took place at 8pm each evening at the BBC Cymru Wales Headquarters Building in central Cardiff. This was the first time there had been evening ceremonies for these prizes. Presentations took place in this fashion for the Drama Medal (2 August), Daniel Owen Prize (3 August), Crowning of the Bard (4 August), Literature Medal (5 August) and finally the Chairing of the Bard (6 August).

A limited audience was allowed at live events which took place in Aberystwyth.

Almost 200 events took place during the week.

=== Online ===
The Eisteddfod Gudd ('hidden eisteddfod'), a live streamed music event including Band Pres Llareggub, Los Blancos and Eden, took place over the first weekend. It was sponsored by Aberystwyth University.

Y Lle Celf, the Eisteddfod's art exhibition, took place virtually, put together by virtual reality specialists 4Pi Productions.

Y Babell Lên ('Literary Pavilion') took place with talks available online, sponsored by Swansea University.

== Notable awards ==
=== Chairing of the Bard ===
The 2021 Eisteddfod Chair was awarded to former headteacher, Gwenallt Llwyd Ifan, for his cynghanedd poem on the subject of "Deffro" ('Awake').

=== Crowning of the Bard ===
There were 20 entrants competing for the 2021 Eisteddfod Crown, which was won by Dyfan Lewis. His collection of poetry was on the subject "Ar wahân" ('Separately').

=== Daniel Owen Memorial Prize ===
Lleucu Roberts won the Daniel Owen Memorial Prize and £5000, for her novel "Hannah-Jane". There were five entries in total, with the judges saying there was a "hair's breadth" between first and second. It was the second time Roberts had won the prize.

=== Welsh Learner of the Year ===
David Thomas, originally from Cardiff, became Welsh Learner of the Year. He had lived in England for many years, before moving to Talog, Carmarthenshire to run a gin distillery.

== Book ==
A book was published by the Eisteddfod AmGen with the title Haf o Hyder ('Summer of Confidence'), in collaboration with publishers Y Lolfa. The book included seven stories and seven poems to inspire hope after a difficult period of new challenges.

== See also ==
- 2022 Ceredigion National Eisteddfod
