= 2025 Wrexham National Eisteddfod =

2025 eisteddfod in Wrexham, Wales

2025 Wrecsam National Eisteddfod
- Part of the National Eisteddfod
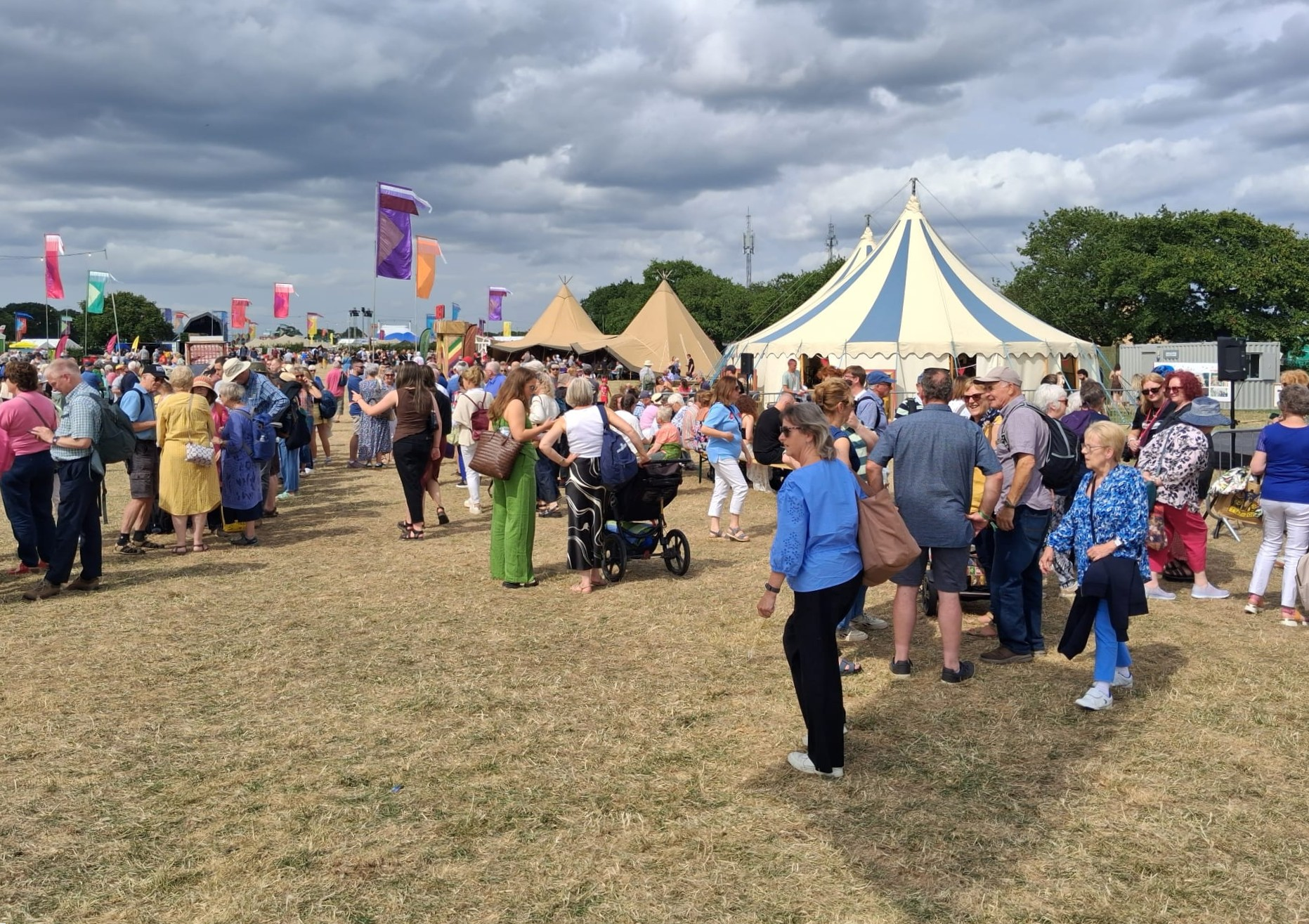
- The Maes at the Eisteddfod
- Location map
- Native name: Eisteddfod Genedlaethol Wrecsam 2025 (Welsh)
- English name: 2025 Wrexham National Eisteddfod
- Date: 2–9 August 2025
- Duration: 7 days
- Venue: Maes near Isycoed
- Location: Isycoed, Wrexham County Borough, Wales; 53.054°N 2.905°W
- Type: Eisteddfod
- Theme: Welsh language and culture
- Organised by: National Eisteddfod of Wales
- Key people: Mark Lewis Jones (honorary president); Llinos Roberts (chairwoman)
- Language: Welsh language
- Website: eisteddfod.wales/festival/2025
- ← 2024 RCT 2026 Pembrokeshire →

The 2025 Wrexham National Eisteddfod was held in Isycoed, Wrexham (Welsh: Wrecsam), Wales, from 2 August to 9 August 2025.

It was the seventh time a national eisteddfod has been held in Wrexham, and the ninth time in the wider county borough. It was part of the National Eisteddfod of Wales, the largest eisteddfod in Wales.

== Background ==
The National Eisteddfod of Wales has been held every year since 1861, with the exception of 1914 (due to World War I), 2020 and 2021 (both due to the COVID-19 pandemic). It is hosted by a different region of Wales each year, alternating between north Wales and south Wales. Since 1950 all competitions and activities at the National Eisteddfod have to be held in only Welsh. Around 6,000 competitors compete in competitions held at the eisteddfod, giving it a claim to be one of Europe's largest music and poetry festivals. It is also the largest of the eisteddfods in Wales. The two main poetry competition events are the Crowning of the Bard and the Chairing of the Bard.

The 2025 Eisteddfod is the seventh time it had been held in Wrexham, and the ninth in the area that now comprises the modern wider county borough. It was held for the first time in (or near) Wrexham in 1876, then subsequently in 1888, 1912, 1933, 1977 and 2011; with nearby Rhosllanerchrugog, also in the county borough, hosting in 1945 and 1961.

The previous 2011 Wrexham National Eisteddfod took place on farmland off Ruthin Road to the west of the city centre, receiving about 20,000 attendants daily, although to an £80,000–£90,000 loss overall.

In July 2011, just prior to the 2011 National Eisteddfod, there were reports that Wrexham council were asked whether they were interested in hosting either the National Eisteddfod or the Urdd National Eisteddfod, in either 2017 or 2022. Although a proposal was more centred on the Urdd edition, with concerns raised due to how close it was after 2011 and whether funds can be raised to host another event so soon.

In July 2022, rumours that the 2025 National Eisteddfod would be held in Wrexham was reported in the media. This followed the council's confirmation for a second bid to the UK City of Culture contest (next one scheduled for 2029), after it was one of four finalists but losing to Bradford for the 2025 UK City of Culture. As part of such bid, the council was recommended to invite the National Eisteddfod to Wrexham in 2025, with it reported that the National Eisteddfod agreed that they intended to host the 2025 event in Wrexham. The National Eisteddfod would be one of seven events hoping to advance the 2029 bid's chances of success.

In June 2023, Wrexham County Borough Council announced £300,000 towards funding a 2025 event, even though the National Eisteddfod had not yet confirmed at the time whether the 2025 event would take place in Wrexham.

It was announced in October 2024, that the 2025 Wrexham Eisteddfod is to be held in Isycoed, with a traditional fenced 'Maes' (festival grounds). The event is estimated to potentially bring up to £16 million to Wrexham's economy and 150,000 visitors are expected to attend during the week it is held. It would have 6,000 competitors.

== Preparations ==
The National Eisteddfod of Wales announced on 1 August 2023, that Wrexham would be the location of their 2025 event. Following the announcement, various grassroots projects were set up to support the Eisteddfod in promoting the Welsh language and culture, with only 12% of local residents in Wrexham speaking Welsh.

Llinos Roberts was announced as the chairwoman of the festival's executive committee in November 2023. Following the conclusion of the 2024 Pontypridd National Eisteddfod, Roberts hoped the Wrexham edition would be "comprehensive", following Rhondda Cynon Taf's (where Pontypridd is located) approach to attract new Welsh speakers.

On 27 April 2024, the Gorsedd Cymru hosted the proclamation ceremony in Wrexham for the National Eisteddfod. 500 local residents and members of the Gorsedd took part. The procession began near Coleg Cambria Yale campus, passing through the city, until it returned to Llwyn Isaf, in front of Wrexham's Guildhall where the ceremony would take place. During the proclamation, the Gorsedd publishes the list of competitions for the 2025 National Eisteddfod. The Cymanfa Ganu (a congregational singing festival) was held at Capel Bethlehem in Rhosllanerchrugog on 28 April 2024.

In March 2025, Wrexham University organised a 10-week course called "Croesawu’r Eisteddfod / Welcoming the Eisteddfod" in preparation for the Eisteddfod. In April 2025, Bradley's Wauns Carnival was cancelled to support the Eisteddfod.

In June 2025, Mark Lewis Jones was announced as the eisteddfod's honorary president.

In July 2025, the Welsh Government announced a £200,000 grant would be provided to help locals on lower incomes attend the eisteddfod.

In August 2025, Wrexham University announced they set up a virtual Eisteddfod in Minecraft.

== Location ==
=== Initial proposals ===
The exact location of the event in Wrexham was subject to discussions between the National Eisteddfod and council, with Erddig as an initial frontrunner and preferred site for the festival. An announcement was set for 5 October 2024, with Erddig "widely expected" to be the site announced, however "contractual issues" led to a site not being entirely agreed and signed off with the landowner. Six venues around Wrexham, including the concept of an "open venue" in Wrexham city centre were considered. Some venues were ruled out due to issues concerning access for emergency services.

=== The Maes ===
On 24 October 2024, the National Eisteddfod announced that the festival would be held in Isycoed, on the eastern outskirts of Wrexham city centre from 2–9 August 2025. It is specifically held on Ridley Wood Road, near Ridleywood, within Isycoed community, just north of Wrexham Industrial Estate.

The Maes is located on agricultural land, alongside Maes B, a caravan site and parking, that is "convenient for visitors from all directions". It contains a 1,500 seat pavilion, performance spaces, stalls and a temporary Gorsedd circle. Simultaneous translation services are provided for a number of sessions across the Maes, with free equipment available from the site's translation centre just outside the Pavilion.

Due to the rural location and distance to the nearest railway station, plans are in place to ensure visitors have "reliable and efficient public transport" to the site, as it would otherwise be a two-hour walk from Wrexham. A free shuttle bus service operated between Wrexham General railway station, Wrexham bus station, and the Maes from 8am to midnight, operated by Arriva Buses Wales. The T3 TrawsCymru service also served the site.

== Competitions and performances ==
Competitions held at the 2025 National Eisteddfod included competitions for brass bands, visual arts, Cerdd Dant, music, dance, folk, science and technology, recitation, literature, theatre, and various competitions in Maes D ("D" meaning Dysgwyr, 'learners' of the Welsh language). Welsh-language television channel, S4C provided coverage on the eisteddfod. The Pavilion hosted competitions of choirs, groups and other performances, with the competition theme at the Pavilion differing each evening.

Maes B, which is dedicated to late-night music for an additional admission charge, features Adwaith, Band Pres Llareggub, Bwncath, Buddug, Dadleoli, Fleur De Lys, Gwilym, Glain Rhys, Mellt, Mared, Pys Melyn, Swnami, Taran, Tara Bandito, Tew Tew Tennau and Y Cledrau.

Dafydd Iwan performed for the final time on the main stage, on Sunday 3 August, after having performed at every National Eisteddfod since 1965.

== Main awards ==
=== Chairing of the Bard ===
The 2025 Eisteddfod Chair was designed by Gafyn Owen and Sean Nelson. Its design represented things important to the Wrexham area, with the arches of the back of the chair reflecting the arches of Pontcysyllte Aqueduct, the red colour of the seat representing the colours of Wrexham Football Club and the top of the chair relating to the club's stadium.

The chair was won by retired university professor, Tudur Hallam, who had won the chair before but had been inspired to write his latest poetry after being diagnosed with untreatable cancer. His winning poem describes receiving his diagnosis at Glangwili Hospital. There were 15 entries to this year's comptetion, the highest number since 1989.

=== Crowning of the Bard ===
Owain Rhys from Cardiff was awarded the Eisteddfod Crown together with a £750 cash prize. He submitted his poems under the pen name of 'Llif 2'. His collection of poems described living with his mother, who suffered with dementia.

=== Gold Medals ===
Gold medals are awarded to exhibitors at the Eisteddfod's art and design exhibition, Y Lle Celf. The 2025 winners were:

- Gold Medal for Fine Art - Gareth Griffith (who had been exhibiting at the Eisteddfod since the 1970s) won the prize for his five submitted paintings
- Gold Medal for Architecture - London-based architecture practice Manalo & White won the medal, for their conversion of St Mary's Church, Bangor, into an arts and performance space.
- Gold Medal for Craft and Design - Verity Pulford, an artist from near Ruthin, won for her colourful glass models of bird skulls

== Honours ==
The following were honoured with admittance to the Gorsedd at the 2025 National Eisteddfod, with ceremonies held on 4 and 8 August: With the prose medal awarded on 6 August.

=== Green robes ===
- Gwyn Anwyl, Anglesey
- Mark Lewis Jones, Cardiff
- Mared Lewis, Anglesey
- Elen Mai Nefydd, Wrexham
- Professor Emeritus Hywel Wyn Owen, Llandegfan, Anglesey
- Ceinwen Parry, Treuddyn, Mold, Flintshire
- Dilwyn Price, Old Colwyn, Conwy
- Rhys Roberts, Blaenau Ffestiniog, Gwynedd
- Stephen Rule, Leeswood, Flintshire
- Dylan Williams, Caernarfon, Gwynedd
- Geraint Cynan, Cardiff
- John Morgans, Penrhys, Rhondda Cynon Taf
- Shân Eleri Passmore, Cardiff
- Jessica Robinson, Crymych, Pembrokeshire
- Professor Ann Parry Owen, Aberystwyth, Ceredigion
- Gareth William Jones, Bow Street, Ceredigion

=== Blue robes ===
- Rhun ap Iorwerth, Anglesey
- David Aykroyd, Bala, Gwynedd
- Nigel Aykroyd, Bala, Gwynedd
- Glesni Llwyd Carter, Wrexham
- Dr Gwenllian Lansdown Davies, Llanerfyl, Powys
- Llinos Griffin, Penrhyndeudraeth, Gwynedd
- Maxine Hughes, Washington D.C., United States
- Tomos Hughes, Cerrigydrudion, Conwy
- Dylan Jones, Denbigh, Denbighshire
- Dylan Rhys Jones, Abergele, Conwy
- Dylan Wyn Jones, Mold, Flintshire
- Keris Jones, Llangollen, Denbighshire
- Lili Mai Jones, Wrexham
- Nia Wyn Jones, Llangefni, Anglesey
- Richard (Dic) Francis Jones, Mold, Flintshire
- Dewi Llwyd, Bangor, Gwynedd
- Dr Lyndon Miles, Bangor, Gwynedd
- Professor Enlli Môn Thomas, Abergwyngregyn, Gwynedd
- Clare Vaughan, Valley of the 16th of October, Argentina
- Gareth Victor Williams, Mold, Flintshire
- Menna Williams, Llangernyw, Conwy
- Bill Davies, Cardiff
- Geraint Evans, Barry, Vale of Glamorgan
- Rhian Griffiths, Cardiff
- Jane Harries, Bridgend
- Gethin Rhys, Cardiff
- Tony Thomas, Llanybydder, Carmarthenshire
- Professor Simon Ward, Cardiff
