= National Eisteddfod of Wales =

Annual festival of Welsh-language culture

National Eisteddfod of Wales Eisteddfod Genedlaethol Cymru (Welsh)
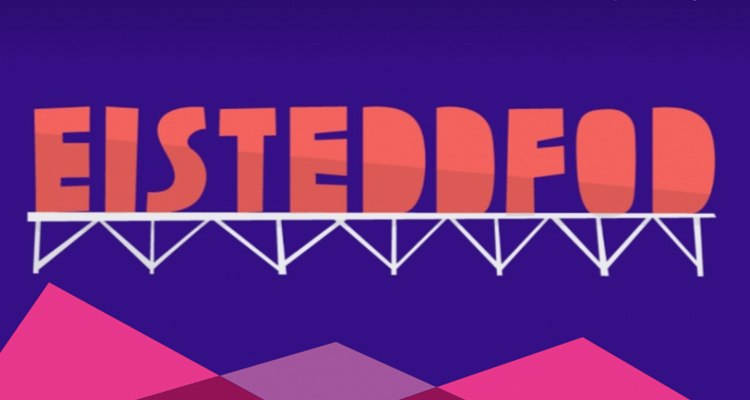
- Logo

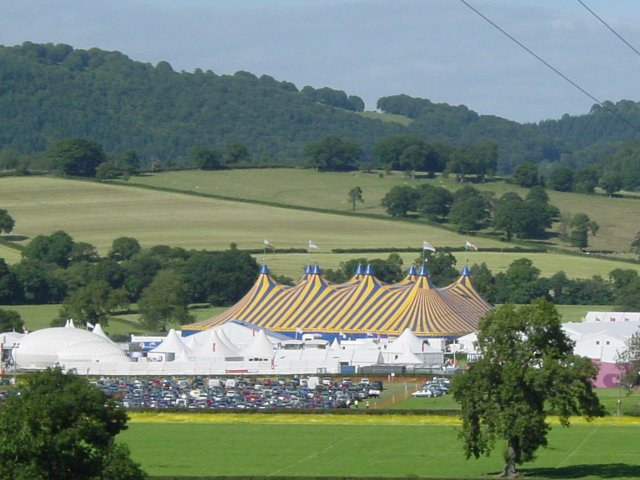
- A view of the Pafiliwn ('pavilion') for the 2003 National Eisteddfod, held at Meifod, Powys
- Status: Active
- Genre: Cultural, music, poetry
- Frequency: Annual (1st week of August)
- Location: Multiple
- Country: United Kingdom (Wales)^{†}
- Established: 1861; 165 years ago
- Participants: 6,000
- Attendance: 100,000 – 186,000
- Leader: Betsan Moses (Chief Executive)
- Website: eisteddfod.wales (in English) eisteddfod.cymru (in Welsh)
- † The festival has occasionally been held in England in the past.

The National Eisteddfod of Wales (Welsh: Eisteddfod Genedlaethol Cymru) is the largest of several festivals known as eisteddfodau that are held annually, mostly in Wales. Its eight days of competitions and performances are considered the largest music and poetry festival in Europe. Competitors typically number 6,000 or more, and overall attendance generally exceeds 100,000 visitors, the highest recently being 186,000 attending the 2024 festival in Pontypridd. The 2018 Eisteddfod was held in Cardiff Bay with a fence-free 'Maes'. In 2020, the event was held virtually under the name AmGen; events were held over a one-week period.

== History ==
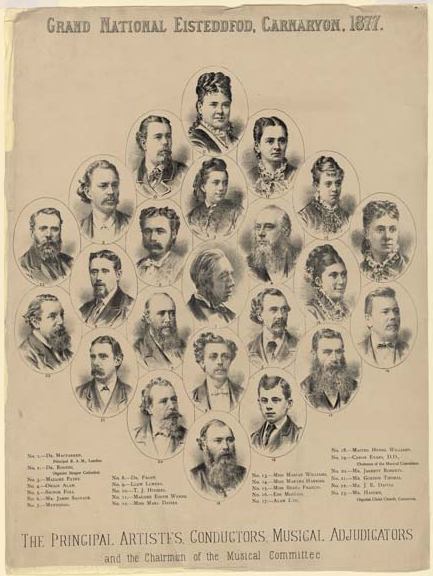
An advertisement for the Grand National Eisteddfod at Caernarvon, 1877

The National Museum of Wales says that "the history of the Eisteddfod may [be] traced back to a bardic competition held by the Lord Rhys in Cardigan Castle in 1176", and local Eisteddfodau were certainly held for many years prior to the first national Eisteddfod. Even before they became a regular annual event, Eisteddfodau were held on a national scale in Wales, such as the Gwyneddigion Eisteddfod of 1789, the Provincial Eisteddfodau from 1819 to 1834, the Abergavenny Eisteddfodau of 1835 to 1851, and The Great Llangollen Eisteddfod of 1858. However the National Eisteddfod of Wales as an organisation traces its history back to 1860 where an executive committee was formed in Denbigh, and the first event was held the next year, in Aberdare.

One of the most dramatic events in Eisteddfod history was the award of the 1917 chair to the poet Ellis Humphrey Evans, bardic name Hedd Wyn, for the poem Yr Arwr (The Hero). The winner was announced, and the crowd waited for the winner to stand up to accept the traditional congratulations before the chairing ceremony, but no winner appeared. It was then announced that Hedd Wyn had been killed the previous month on the battlefield at Passchendaele in Belgium. These events were portrayed in the Academy Award nominated film Hedd Wyn.

The political party, Plaid Cymru - originally Plaid Genedlaethol Cymru ("National Party of Wales") - was founded on 5 August 1925 during the National Eisteddfod at Pwllheli, Gwynedd. The six founders met in a Pwllheli café called Maes Gwyn with the aim of establishing a "Welsh party". The principal aim of the party would be to foster a Welsh-speaking Wales.

In 1940, during the Second World War, the Eisteddfod was not held, for fear that it would be a bombing target. Instead, the BBC broadcast an Eisteddfod radio programme, and the Chair, Crown and a Literature Medal (as opposed to the usual Prose Medal) were awarded.

From 1950 onward, a newly created rule required all competitions to be held in Welsh. However, settings of the mass in Latin are allowed and this has been controversially used to allow concerts featuring international soloists.

=== 21st century ===
In recent years efforts have been made to attract more non-Welsh speakers to the event, with the official website stating "everyone is welcome at the Eisteddfod, whatever language they speak". The Eisteddfod offers bilingual signage and simultaneous translation of many events through wireless headphones. There is also a Welsh learners area called Maes D. These efforts have helped increase takings, and the 2006 Eisteddfod reported a profit of over £100,000, despite costing £2.8m to stage. The Eisteddfod attracts some 160,000 people annually. The National Eisteddfod in Cardiff (2008) drew record crowds, with over 160,000 visitors attending.

It was proposed that the 2018 National Eisteddfod in Cardiff would use permanent buildings to host events, rather than the traditional Maes site and tents. This was due partially to a lack of suitable land that could be repaired affordably after the festival. It was billed as an "Eisteddfod with no fence" in the media and was held at Cardiff Bay.

At the 2018 Cardiff Eisteddfod, the bardic crown was awarded to poet Catrin Dafydd, for her collection Olion ("Traces"). Her poems explored Welsh identity in the multiracial and multiethnic Grangetown district of Cardiff. During the ceremony, however, the Archdruid, Geraint Llifon, caused considerable outrage among feminists when he alleged that Catrin Dafydd could not have won the Crown without the help of men. After this caused him to be accused of sexism, Archdruid Llifon apologized.

The 2019 Eisteddfod in Llanrwst returned to the traditional Maes.

The 2020 Eisteddfod was postponed for 12 months because of the international COVID-19 pandemic. This was the first year no Eisteddfod had taken place since 1914, when the event was cancelled at short notice because of the outbreak of the Great War. The festival was subsequently postponed for a second year, with the next full National Eisteddfod not taking place until August 2022.

Eisteddfodau Amgen (Alternative Eisteddfods) were held in August 2020 and August 2021, with limited events being available online and via television and radio broadcasters. Almost 200 events took place at the 2021 Eisteddfod AmGen, with a limited 'live' audience allowed to attend in Aberystwyth.

The 2026 National Eisteddfod was held in north Pembrokeshire from 1 to 8 August, marking the 850th anniversary of the first recorded Eisteddfod held at Cardigan Castle in 1176. The festival featured more than 1,000 events celebrating Welsh music, literature and culture.

=== Attendance ===
(incomplete)

Year	Total attendance	Profit/loss
2002	144,220	–
2003	176,402	+£3,000
2004	147,785	–£291,000
2005	157,820	+£220,000
2006	155,437	+£100,000
2007	154,944	+£4,324
2008	156,697	+£38,000
2009	164,689	+£145,000
2010	136,933	–£47,000
2011	148,892	-£90,000
2012	138,767	+£50,000
2013	153,704	+£76,000
2014	143,502	+£90,000
2015	150,776	+£54,721
2016	140,229	+£6,000
2017	147,498	+£93,200
2018	~500,000	–£290,000
2019	150,000	–£158,982

== Overview ==
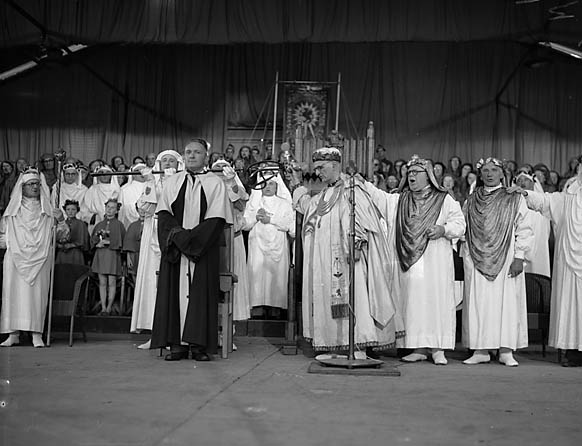
The chairing ceremony of the 1958 National Eisteddfod; the victorious poet was T. Llew Jones

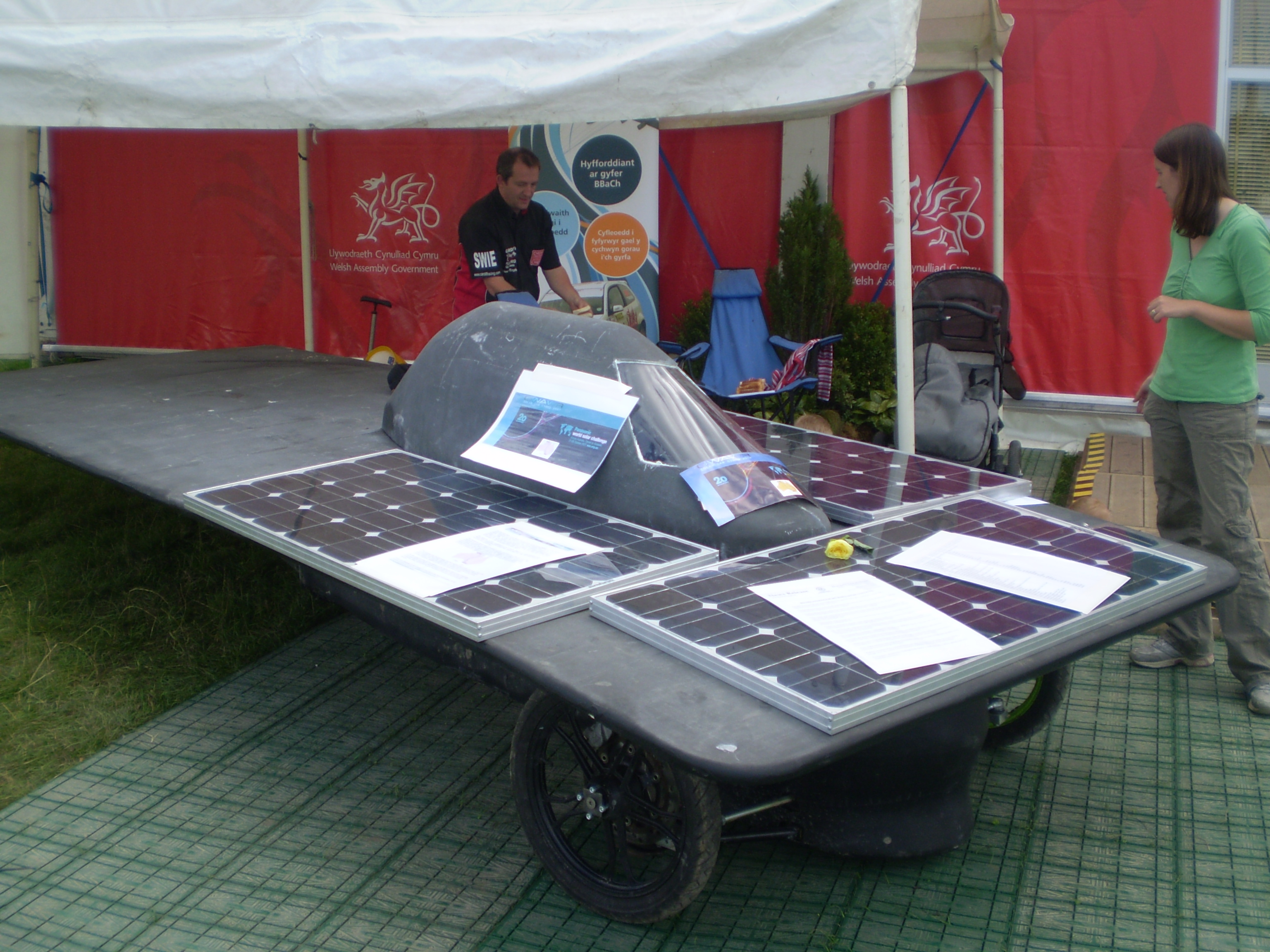
The solar-powered car Gwawr ("Dawn"), the Welsh entry in the October 2007 Darwin-Adelaide Trans-Australia competition, is an example of what can be exhibited on the Eisteddfod Maes (Arena). (Mold, 2007)

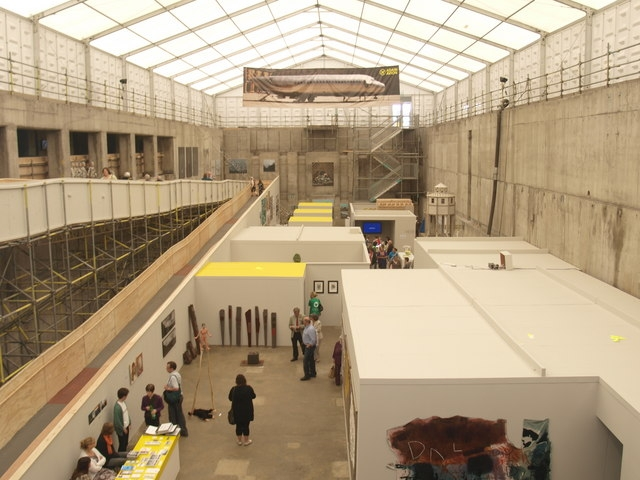
'Y Lle Celf' (Blaenau Gwent, 2010)

The National Eisteddfod is traditionally held in the first week of August, and the competitions are all held in the Welsh language. However, settings of the mass in Latin are allowed and this has been controversially used to allow concerts featuring international soloists.

Eisteddfod Act 1959 (Note: Section 3.)
- Act of Parliament
- Parliament of the United Kingdom
- Long title: An Act to make further provision for contributions by local authorities in Wales (including Monmouthshire) towards the expenses of the Royal National Eisteddfod.
- Citation: 7 & 8 Eliz. 2. c. 32
- Territorial extent: United Kingdom

Dates
- Royal assent: 30 April 1959
- Commencement: 30 April 1959 (Note: The Acts of Parliament (Commencement) Act 1793.)
- Repealed: 22 July 2004
Other legislation
Repealed by	Statute Law (Repeals) Act 2004

Status: Repealed

Text of statute as originally enacted

The venue is officially proclaimed a year in advance, at which time the themes and texts for the competitions are published. The organisation for the location will have begun a year or more earlier, and locations are generally known two or three years ahead. The Eisteddfod Act 1959 (7 & 8 Eliz. 2. c. 32) allowed local authorities to give financial support to the event. Traditionally, the Eisteddfod venue alternates between north and south Wales; the decision to hold both the 2014 and 2015 Eisteddfodau in South Wales was thus seen as controversial, but the decision was later reversed and Montgomeryshire named as host county for 2015. Occasionally the Eisteddfod has been held in England, although the last occasion was in 1929.

According to historian Jan Morris in 1984, "The Eisteddfod Genedlaethol flourishes as never before, having matured from cranky antiquarianism through rigid chapel respectability to a fairly pragmatic tolerance of public views and social styles. Though its competitions are confined solely to the Welsh language, and even though many Welsh-speaking writers and musicians prefer to have nothing to do with it, still it remains the Chief public expression of the Welsh culture's continued existence, the one occasion when a stranger can realize that the language is still creative, the traditions are not lost, and the loyalty of the Welsh to their origins is not dissipated. Honorary membership in the Gorsedd is still the only honour the Welsh nation can bestow upon its sons and daughters, and in a key and of back-handed symbolism, the British Government's Secretary of State for Wales is generally invited to open the festival's proceedings (generally having to learn a few words of Welsh in order to do so)."

=== The Maes ===
Hundreds of tents, pavilions and booths are erected in an open space to create the Maes (field). The space required for this means that it is rare for the Eisteddfod to be in a city or town: instead it is held somewhere with more space. Car parking for day visitors alone requires several large fields, and many people camp on the site for the whole week.

According to Morris, "Most institutions of modern Wales are represented on the Maes, Gas Board to University of Wales Press, the genteel Society for the Protection of Rural Wales to the fiery Cymdeithas yr Iaith Gymraeg the Welsh Language Society. There are shops selling harps, and comic stickers, and Lol the lewd and racy student magazine, and pottery, and evangelical tracts, and lots and lots of books."

If no stone circle is there already, one is created out of Gorsedd stones, usually taken from the local area. These stone circles are icons all across Wales and signify the Eisteddfod having visited a community. As a cost-saving measure, the 2005 Eisteddfod was the first to use a temporary "fibre-glass stone" circle for the druidic ceremonies instead of a permanent stone circle. This also has the benefit of bringing the Gorsedd ceremonies onto the maes: previously they were often held many miles away, hidden from most of the public.

As well as the main pavilion with the main stage, there are other venues through the week. Some are fixtures every year, hosting gigs (Maes B/Llwyfan y Maes/Caffi Maes B). Other fixtures of the maes are the Pabell Lên (literature pavilion), the Neuadd Ddawns (dance hall), the Pabell Wyddoniaeth a Thechnoleg (science and technology pavilion), Maes D (learners' pavilion), at least one theatre, Y Cwt Drama (the drama hut), Tŷ Gwerin (folk house), Y Lle Celf ("the Art Place") and hundreds of stondinau (stands and booths) where groups, societies, councils, charities and shops exhibit and sell. Since 2004, alcohol has been sold on the maes; previously there was a no-alcohol policy.

=== Gorsedd of Bards ===
The festival has a quasi-druidic flavour, with the main literary prizes for poetry and prose being awarded in colourful and dramatic ceremonies under the auspices of the Gorsedd of Bards of the Island of Britain, complete with prominent figures in Welsh cultural life dressed in flowing druidic costumes, flower dances, trumpet fanfares and a symbolic Horn of Plenty. However, the Gorsedd is not an ancient institution or a pagan ceremony but rather a romantic creation by Iolo Morganwg in the 1790s, which first became a formal part of the Eisteddfod ceremonial in 1819. Nevertheless, it is taken very seriously, and an award of a crown or a chair for poetry is a great honour. The Chairing and Crowning ceremonies are the highlights of the week, and are presided over by the Archdruid. Other important awards include the Prose Medal (first introduced in 1937) and Welsh Learner of the Year award (first introduced in 1983).

There are three ranks of membership in the Gorsedd. Until 2012 they were, in ascending order of honour:

- Ovates, who wear green robes (Green signifying a verdant spring)
- Bards, who wear blue robes, and (Blue signifying the season)
- Druids, who wear white robes. (White signifying old age and sanctity)

== Poetry awards ==
The Eisteddfod's most well-known awards are those for poetry.

=== Chairing of the Bard ===
The chair is awarded for an awdl, a long poem in strict metre. A new bardic chair is specially designed and made for each eisteddfod.

=== Crowning of the Bard ===
The crown is awarded for a pryddest, a poem in free verse. A new bardic crown is specially designed and made for each eisteddfod. The competition for the pryddest was first introduced to the National Eisteddfod in 1867. A medal rather than a crown was awarded that year.

During the 1912 National Eisteddfod at Wrexham, T.H. Parry-Williams achieved for the first time the feat of winning both the chair and the crown. Parry-Williams later recalled returning home to Rhyd-ddu, where had been working as a hired hand on the farm of a relative. Upon telling his employer of his double victory, Parry-Williams was advised to "seek grace". When Parry-Williams then informed his employer that both victories had gained him £40, the relative shouted in angry disbelief, "Ac mi gwnest nhw i gyd ar dy din!!!" ('And you did them all sitting on your arse!!!').

==== Pryddest ====
Pryddest is a literary term used in Welsh to describe a genre of poetry in free metre. It refers to a single poem, as opposed to a collection of poems, in the context of the competition for the Eisteddfod Crown. Although the earliest example of the word can be found in the work of the Poets of the Princes (meaning poem or song), and according to the University of Wales Dictionary the word is the source of the verb prydaf, meaning "to compose poetry", the bardic form is mainly connected with the Eisteddfod. It corresponds to the awdl in strict metre.

The pryddest can be composed in one or more free metres, and there are no important rules about its length, nor about its form. These relaxed rules mean that bards that compose pryddestau enjoy much more freedom in comparison with the strict verse competitions for the chair.

== Welsh-language album of the year ==
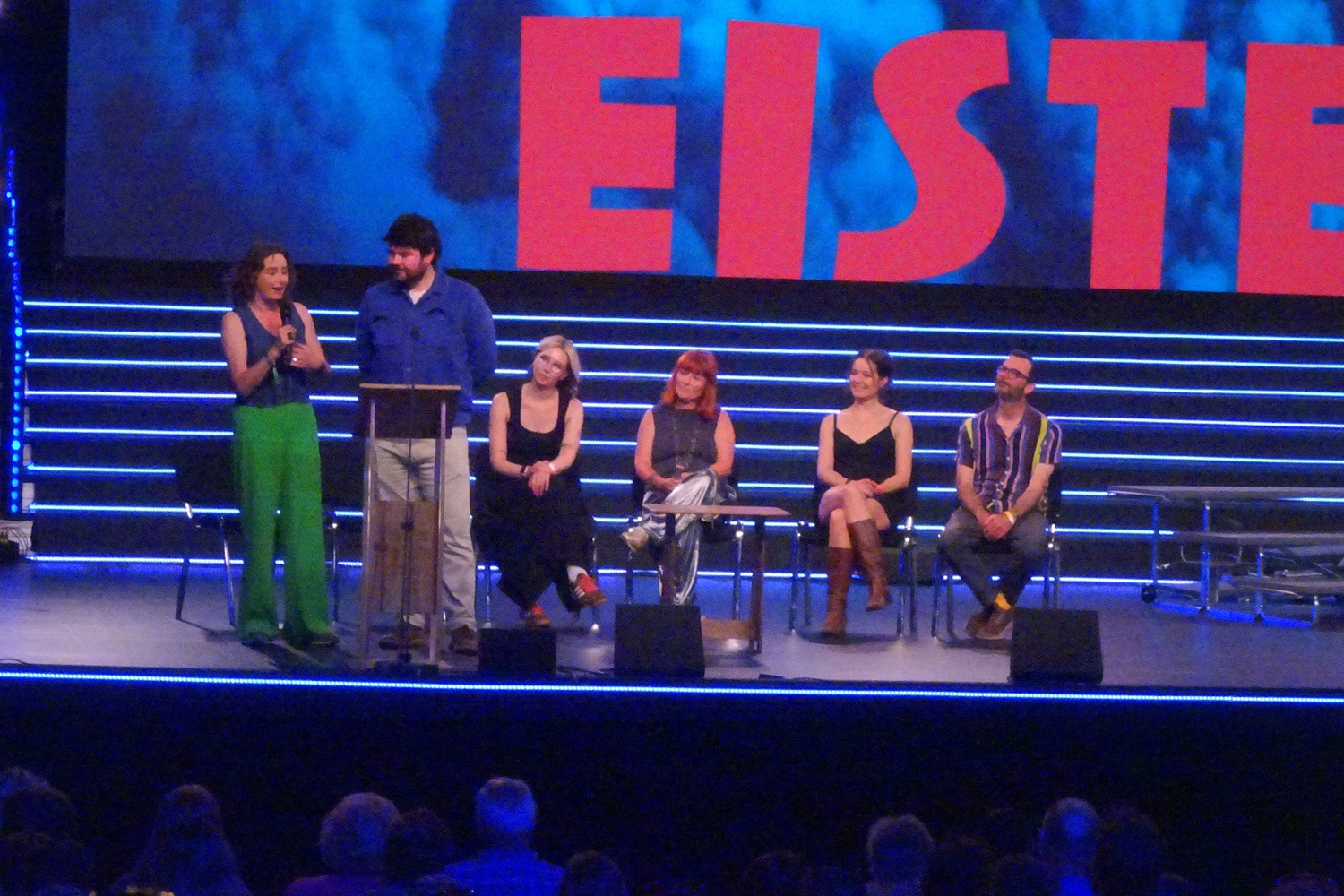
Daf Owain receives the 2026 award

In 2014, the Eisteddfod began to award a Welsh-language Album of the Year (Albwm Cymraeg Y Flwyddyn) during its Maes B event.

Year	Winner
2014	The Gentle Good – Y Bardd Anfarwol
2015	Gwenno – Y Dydd Olaf
2016	Sŵnami – Sŵnami
2017	Bendith – Bendith
2018	Mellt – Mae’n Hawdd Pan ti’n Ifanc
2020	Ani Glass ‒ Mirores
2021	Mared – Y Drefn
2022	Sywel Nyw – Deuddeg
2023	Pedair - mae ‘na olau
2024	Cowbois Rhos Botwnnog - Mynd â'r tŷ am dro
2025	Ynys - Dosbarth Nos
2026	Daf Owain - Ymarfer Byw

== National Eisteddfod venues ==
(Venues in England are in italics)

=== Gwyneddigion Events ===
- May 1789 - Corwen Eisteddfod
- September 1789 - Bala Eisteddfod
- 1790 - St Asaph
- 1791 - Llanrwst
- 1791 - London (Primrose Hill) - Creation of the Gorsedd
- June 1792 - London - Meeting of the Gorsedd
- 1792 - Denbigh
- 1793 - Bala
- 1795 - Penmorfa
- 1798 - Caerwys

=== Earlier Eisteddfodau ===
Provincial Eisteddfodau:

- 1819 - Camarthen (the Ivy Bush Inn)
- 1824, 1828 and 1829 - Denbigh
- 1832 - Beaumaris
- 1834 - Cardiff

Eisteddfodau were held in Abergavenny almost every year between 1834 and 1853 by Lady Llanover, known as the Abergavenny Eisteddfodau.

=== Official National Eisteddfodau ===
- 1861 – Aberdare
- 1862 – Caernarfon
- 1863 – Swansea
- 1864 – Llandudno
- 1865 – Aberystwyth
- 1866 – Chester
- 1867 – Carmarthen
- 1868 – Ruthin
- 1869 – Holywell (unofficial)
- 1870 – Rhyl (unofficial)
- 1871 – Tywyn (unofficial)
- 1872 – Tremadog (unofficial)
- 1873 – Mold (unofficial)
- 1874 – Bangor (unofficial)
- 1875 – Pwllheli (unofficial)
- 1876 – Wrexham (unofficial)
- 1877 – Caernarfon (unofficial)
- 1878 – Birkenhead (unofficial)
- 1879 – Conwy (unofficial)
- 1880 – Caernarfon
- 1881 – Merthyr Tydfil
- 1882 – Denbigh
- 1883 – Cardiff
- 1884 – Liverpool
- 1885 – Aberdare
- 1886 – Caernarfon
- 1887 – London (Royal Albert Hall)
- 1888 – Wrexham
- 1889 – Brecon
- 1890 – Bangor
- 1891 – Swansea
- 1892 – Rhyl
- 1893 – Pontypridd
- 1894 – Caernarfon
- 1895 – Llanelli
- 1896 – Llandudno
- 1897 – Newport
- 1898 – Blaenau Ffestiniog
- 1899 – Cardiff
- 1900 – Liverpool
- 1901 – Merthyr Tydfil
- 1902 – Bangor
- 1903 – Llanelli
- 1904 – Rhyl
- 1905 – Mountain Ash
- 1906 – Caernarfon
- 1907 – Swansea
- 1908 – Llangollen
- 1909 – London (Royal Albert Hall)
- 1910 – Colwyn Bay
- 1911 – Carmarthen
- 1912 – Wrexham
- 1913 – Abergavenny
- 1914 – Not held
- 1915 – Bangor
- 1916 – Aberystwyth
- 1917 – Birkenhead
- 1918 – Neath
- 1919 – Corwen
- 1920 – Barry
- 1921 – Caernarfon
- 1922 – Ammanford
- 1923 – Mold
- 1924 – Pontypool
- 1925 – Pwllheli
- 1926 – Swansea
- 1927 – Holyhead
- 1928 – Treorchy
- 1929 – Liverpool
- 1930 – Llanelli
- 1931 – Bangor
- 1932 – Aberavon
- 1933 – Wrexham
- 1934 – Neath
- 1935 – Caernarfon
- 1936 – Fishguard
- 1937 – Machynlleth
- 1938 – Cardiff
- 1939 – Denbigh
- 1940 – Mountain Ash (Radio Eisteddfod)
- 1941 – Old Colwyn
- 1942 – Cardigan
- 1943 – Bangor
- 1944 – Llandybie
- 1945 – Rhosllannerchrugog
- 1946 – Mountain Ash
- 1947 – Colwyn Bay
- 1948 – Bridgend
- 1949 – Dolgellau
- 1950 – Caerphilly
- 1951 – Llanrwst
- 1952 – Aberystwyth
- 1953 – Rhyl
- 1954 – Ystradgynlais
- 1955 – Pwllheli
- 1956 – Aberdare
- 1957 – Llangefni
- 1958 – Ebbw Vale
- 1959 – Caernarfon
- 1960 – Cardiff
- 1961 – Rhosllannerchrugog
- 1962 – Llanelli
- 1963 – Llandudno
- 1964 – Swansea
- 1965 – Newtown
- 1966 – Aberavon (Margam)
- 1967 – Bala
- 1968 – Barry
- 1969 – Flint
- 1970 – Ammanford
- 1971 – Bangor
- 1972 – Haverfordwest
- 1973 – Ruthin
- 1974 – Carmarthen
- 1975 – Criccieth
- 1976 – Cardigan
- 1977 – Wrexham
- 1978 – Cardiff
- 1979 – Caernarfon
- 1980 – Gowerton – Lliw Valley
- 1981 – Machynlleth
- 1982 – Swansea
- 1983 – Llangefni
- 1984 – Lampeter
- 1985 – Rhyl
- 1986 – Fishguard
- 1987 – Porthmadog
- 1988 – Newport
- 1989 – Llanrwst
- 1990 – Rhymney Valley
- 1991 – Mold
- 1992 – Aberystwyth
- 1993 – Llanelwedd
- 1994 – Neath
- 1995 – Abergele
- 1996 – Llandeilo (Ffairfach)
- 1997 – Bala
- 1998 – Bridgend (Pencoed)
- 1999 – Anglesey (Llanbedrgoch)
- 2000 – Llanelli
- 2001 – Denbigh
- 2002 – St David's
- 2003 – Meifod, near Welshpool
- 2004 – Newport
- 2005 – Faenol Estate, near Bangor
- 2006 – Swansea (Felindre)
- 2007 – Mold
- 2008 – Cardiff
- 2009 – Bala
- 2010 – Ebbw Vale
- 2011 – Wrexham
- 2012 – Llandow, Vale of Glamorgan
- 2013 – Denbigh
- 2014 – Carmarthenshire (Llanelli)
- 2015 – Montgomeryshire (Meifod, near Welshpool)
- 2016 – Monmouthshire (Abergavenny)
- 2017 – Anglesey (Bodedern)
- 2018 – Cardiff (Cardiff Bay)
- 2019 – Llanrwst
- 2020 – Not held
- 2021 – 'AmGen'
- 2022 – Tregaron
- 2023 – Boduan
- 2024 – Rhondda Cynon Taf (Pontypridd)
- 2025 – Wrexham (Isycoed)
- 2026 – Pembrokeshire (Llantood)
- 2027 – Powys (Glantwymyn)
- 2028 – Cardiff

The Eisteddfod has visited all the traditional counties of Wales. It has visited six of the seven current cities in Wales: Bangor, Cardiff, Newport, St David's, Swansea and Wrexham. It visited Wrexham when it was classified as a town; Wrexham attained city status in 2022, and subsequently visited in 2025. It has never visited St Asaph, which attained city status in 2012.

Numbers of Eisteddfodau in each historic county
County	19th century	20th century	21st century	Total (1861–2024)
Anglesey	0	4	1	5
Brecknockshire	1	2	0	3
Caernarfonshire	11	15	2	28
Cardiganshire	1	6	1	8
Carmarthenshire	2	9	2	13
Cheshire	2	1	0	3
Denbighshire	4	14	3	21
(Flintshire (historic)) Flintshire	3	6	1	10
Glamorgan	8	24	6	38
Lancashire	2	1	0	3
(Merionethshire) Merioneth	1	4	1	6
Middlesex	1	1	0	2
(Monmouthshire (historic)) Monmouthshire	1	5	3	9
Montgomeryshire	0	3	2	5
Pembrokeshire	0	3	1	4
Radnorshire	0	1	0	1

== See also ==
- Gold Medal (National Eisteddfod of Wales)
- Royal National Mòd
- Welsh Learner of the Year
