= 2018 Cardiff National Eisteddfod =

Welsh music and poetry festival

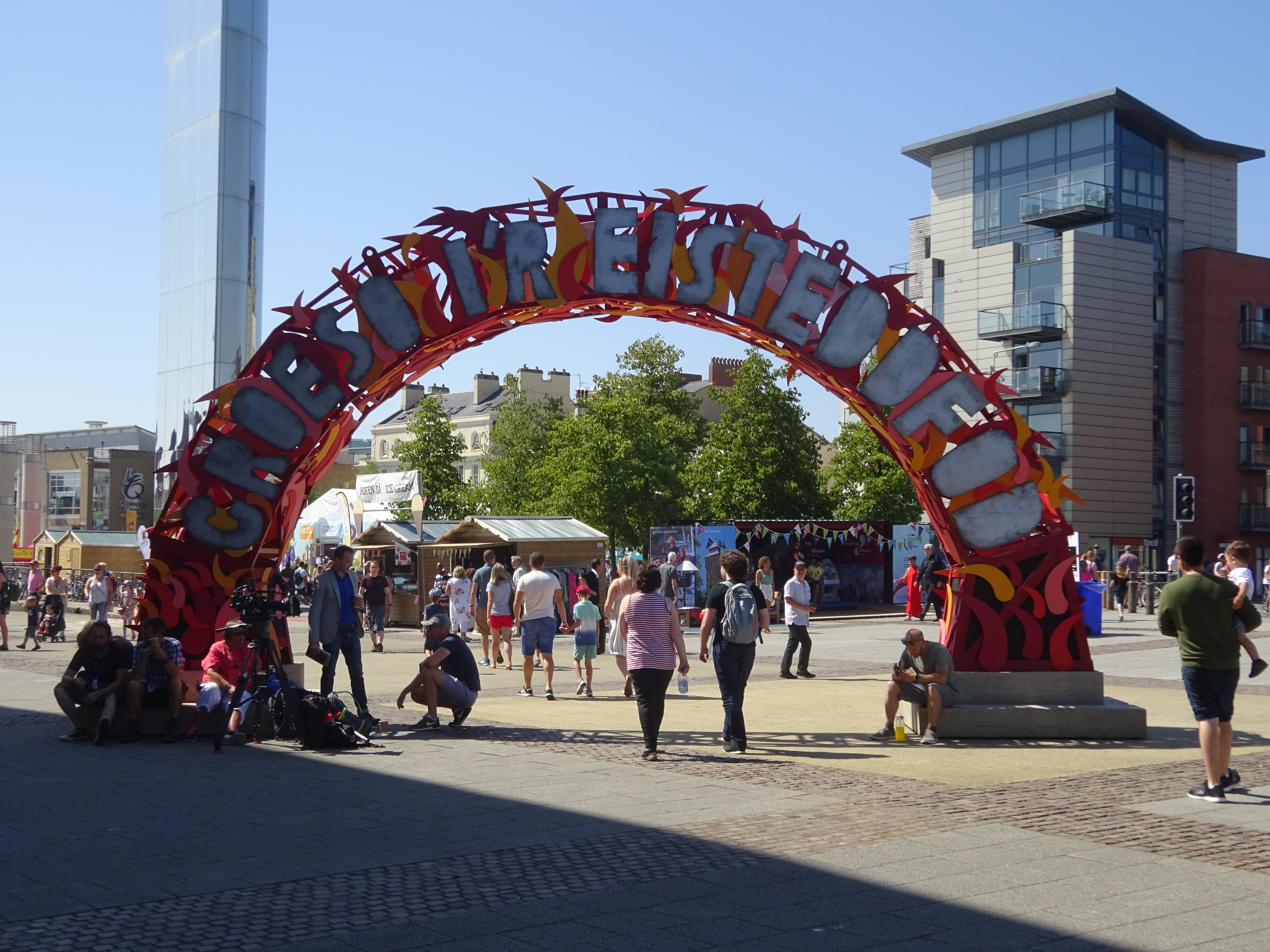
- The Eisteddfod arch on Roald Dahl Plass, Cardiff Bay
- Native name: Eisteddfod Genedlaethol Caerdydd 2018
- Date: 3–11 August 2018
- Duration: 9 days
- Venue: Various
- Location: Cardiff Bay; 51°27′50″N 3°9′51″W
- Theme: Welsh language and culture

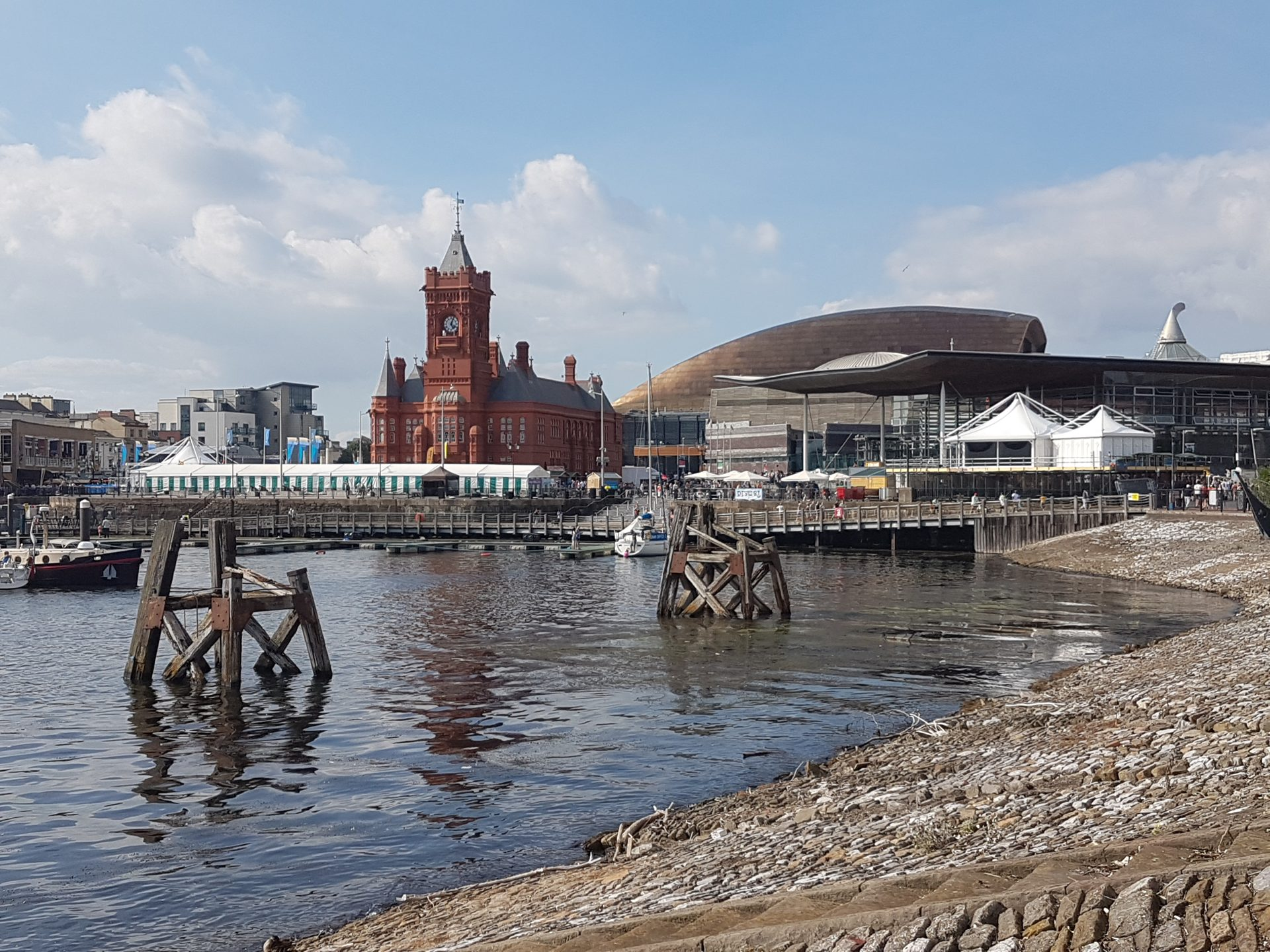
National Eisteddfod tents in Cardiff Bay

The 2018 Cardiff National Eisteddfod was held in Cardiff Bay, Wales, from 3 to 11 August 2018. It was the seventh time the National Eisteddfod of Wales had been held in Cardiff. The 2018 event was billed as the Eisteddfod with "No fences" because it dispensed with the traditional enclosed Maes, or entrance fees to the event location. It made a £290,000 loss, but its popularity led to the suggestion of future Eisteddfods without fences.

== Background ==
The National Eisteddfod of Wales had been held every year since 1861, with the exception of 1914 because of World War I. It is hosted by a different region of Wales each year. Since 1950 all competitions have been held in Welsh. Around 6,000 competitions are held, in poetry, music, dance, drama and literature, giving it a claim to be the largest music and poetry festival in Europe. The main competition events are the Crowning of the Bard and the Chairing of the Bard.

The 2018 Eisteddfod was the seventh time it had been held in Cardiff. It was held for the first time in Cardiff in 1883, subsequently in 1899, 1938, 1960, 1978 and 2008. The 2008 Cardiff Eisteddfod was held in Pontcanna Fields, with a traditional fenced 'Maes' (festival grounds).

== Preparations ==
In August 2015 the Eisteddfod's chief executive, Elfed Roberts, announced he was in discussions with Cardiff Council about the idea of holding the 2018 event in permanent buildings in Cardiff city centre, rather than the traditional Maes. In April 2016 the Eisteddfod backed the plans, as a one-year experiment to attract more visitors, though the event would be held in Cardiff Bay rather than the city centre. Existing buildings in the Bay area, such as the Wales Millennium Centre, would be used. The plan was designed to avoid rent and reparation costs, possibly of up to £500,000, needed to site the Eisteddfod again in one of the public parks.

The target of £320,000 fundraising had been met a month before the Eisteddfod was due to start.

== The Maes ==
The main event locations of the Maes were sited around Roald Dahl Plass and the marina of Cardiff Bay. The Wales Millennium Centre became the main 'Pavilion' and 'Y Babell Lên' (Literature Pavilion), with daily tickets available for £10. The Pierhead Building hosted an 80th anniversary art exhibition by the Contemporary Art Society for Wales. It also performed the role of 'Maes D' (the Learners Area), in 2018 called Shw'mae Caerdydd.

The Senedd building hosted Y Lle Celf (The art place) with exhibitions of Wales' best contemporary art, craft and design.

The meeting rooms of the Senedd also became the Societies Pavilions.

'Maes B', traditionally the pop and rock music event, was held in the vacant Doctor Who Experience building 'Caffi Maes B', 'Ty Gwerin' (folk music) and 'Sinemaes' (the cinema) were held in large tents nearby.

The Welsh College of Music and Drama held concerts of harp, piano and woodwind music in the Norwegian Church.

Coronau, an exhibition of previous National Eisteddfod crowns, took place in Craft in the Bay.

Camping was available further afield, with 338 camping places for families at Pontcanna Fields and the 'Maes B' campsite (for younger revellers) at Fitzalan High School in Leckwith.

== Main awards ==
=== Chairing of the Bard ===
The 2025 Eisteddfod Chair, awarded for strict metre cynghanedd poetry, went to 32 year-old S4C editor Gruffudd Eifion Owen. The judges described his poem as "so trenchant in the way it deals with experiences which are a way of life for the digital generation."

=== Crowning of the Bard ===
Cardiff-born Catrin Dafydd, using the pen name 'Yma', was awarded the Eisteddfod Crown. Her collection of poems explored the "mixed Welshness" of the central Cardiff district of Grangetown.

== Aftermath ==
In November it was announced that the Cardiff Eisteddfod had made an overall loss of £290,000. This was largely because of additional security requirements of the open event. The festival cost £4 million to stage. An estimated 500,000 visitors had attended the Eisteddfod, three times more than the 2017 event. Prior to 2018, the National Eisteddfod had made a profit every year since 2012, with a £93,000 surplus in 2017 despite the Anglesey festival almost being cancelled by the weather. The Eisteddfod council said that more public money would be needed to fund the tourism aspect and make similar open events viable in the future.

In October 2018, a public meeting was held in Caernarfon to promote the idea of holding the 2021 National Eisteddfod in the town using existing permanent buildings.

In May 2019 the Urdd Eisteddfod held its first festival without admission fees, which also took place in Cardiff Bay, with more than 100 stalls.

The 2019 National Eisteddfod returned to the usual fenced Maes with daily entrance fees of £20 for visitors. However, Ceredigion's Assembly Member, Elin Jones, announced she was keen to support a fenceless Eisteddfod for the 2020 event in Tregaron.
