= Clive Bowen =

British potter

- Born: 1943 (age 82–83); Cardiff
- Education: Cardiff College of Art
- Occupation: Potter
- Known for: Pottery
- Spouse(s): Alison Leach, Rosie Bowen
- Children: Dylan, Nicolette, Helena, Tom
- Website: https://clivebowen.co.uk/

Clive Bowen (born 1943 in Cardiff) is a Devon-based potter. Bowen studied painting and etching at Cardiff Art School before becoming apprenticed to Michael Leach in 1965. In 1971 he bought a property on the North Devon coast. Bowen converted the outbuildings into his workshop, and in 1976 built a double-chambered wood kiln, with a capacity of over 400 cu. ft. holding over 1000 pots. Having exhibited all over Great Britain, Bowen has also shown in Israel, Denmark and South America and has had several sell-out shows in Japan. His work is held in public collections throughout the UK and abroad.

== Education and training ==
Bowen studied painting and etching at Cardiff College of Art from 1960–64. He then became the apprentice of Michael Leach at Yelland Pottery where he came to love the rich Fremington clay and earthenware of Fishley. A further year at Brannam Pottery in Barnstaple allowed him to develop his throwing skills and to gain the ability to make large pots. Residing in North Devon allowed Bowen the opportunity to help fire pots at Wenford Bridge with Michael Cardew and to meet Svend Bayer who became a lifelong friend.

== Career ==
In 1971 Bowen purchased a small agricultural property at Shebbear in North Devon and established his pottery with large double-chambered woodfiring kilns. Bowen still uses local Fremington clay and is internationally known and respected for his powerful yet intimate pieces. Bowen exhibits widely in the UK throughout Europe, North America and Japan.

== Style ==
He has been described "as a gestural decorator, even something of an action painter, applying a fluid spontaneity and broad hand to his trailing, pouring and combing. Seeing his pots in groups – runs of splendid jugs, bowls, platters and press-moulded dishes – reveals Bowen's ability to explore within the parameters of his signature forms." (David Whiting)

== Public collections ==
Bowens work can is included in a number of public collection in the UK including:

- Victoria and Albert Museum
- Amgueddfa Cymru – Museum Wales
- Ulster Museum
- Fitzwilliam Museum, Cambridge
- York Art Gallery
- Aberystwyth University Gallery
- Crafts Council Collection
- Royal Albert Memorial Museum

== Personal life ==
Bowen was married to Alison Leach, daughter of Michael Leach and granddaughter of Bernard Leach His children, Dylan Bowen and Helena Bowen, are also potters.
