= Cranks (restaurant) =

Defunct chain of English wholefood vegetarian restaurants

Coordinates: 51.5132°N 0.1388°W

- Interactive map of Cranks

Restaurant information
- Previous owners: David Canter; Kay Canter; Daphne Swann
- Food type: Vegetarian
- Location: United Kingdom

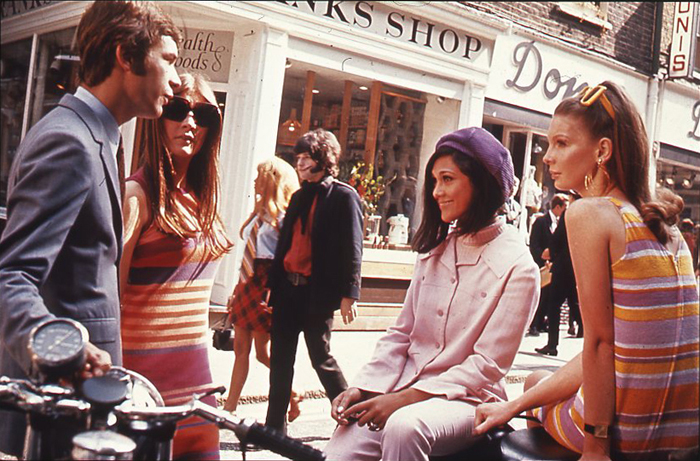
Cranks (background) on Carnaby Street, 1966

Cranks was a chain of English wholefood vegetarian restaurants. It was founded and owned by David and Kay Canter and Daphne Swann, and its flagship restaurant was at Marshall Street in the West End of London.

== History ==
The first Cranks opened at 22 Carnaby Street, London, in 1961. In 1968 there were 16 vegetarian restaurants in London and 18 in the United Kingdom. Although it was by no means the first vegetarian restaurant in the U.K. – Sir George Newnes, 1st Baronet opened a successful vegetarian restaurant in Manchester in 1881 called Vegetarian Company's Saloon.

In the 1950s, David Canter was treated by an osteopath who introduced him to the idea of healthy eating. While he was converting premises in Carnaby Street for the Craft Potters Association (of which he was a co-founder), a vacant bakery came on to the market nearby and Canter decided to make it into a healthy food salad bar. At that time Carnaby Street was, in Canter's words "not swinging, but a street of small shops and cafés." Canter, his wife Kay, and Swann borrowed £500 to start the restaurant.

The style of decor was also new, although owing something to 1950s coffee bars. There were solid natural-coloured oak tables, hand thrown stoneware pottery made by ceramicists Ray Finch and Sidney Tustin at Winchcombe Pottery, heather-brown quarry tiles, woven basket lampshades, and hand-woven seat covers.

Cranks moved to larger premises in Marshall Street in 1967. In the next decade they opened branches at Dartmouth, Totnes, Guildford, Dartington, Heals furniture store in Tottenham Court Road, and the Peter Robinson department store in Oxford Street. A sole franchise, the Cranks Grønne Buffet, was opened in Copenhagen.

David Canter died in 1981. Celebrity chef Denis Cotter worked at Cranks in the 1980s. In 1987 Kay Canter and Daphne Swann sold Cranks to Guinness. Opening more branches under a new business plan, the business encountered financial difficulties, attributed by some to a dated image. It was then bought and sold several times, and in the 1990s was rebranded, bringing it in line with contemporary sandwich bars. In 1998 it was bought by Capricorn International, who invested £1.5m in the London branches, but continuing losses forced them to close the restaurants. The brand was then sold to Nando's Grocery Ltd.

Most of the Cranks restaurants closed in 2012 and an estimated 60 staff were made redundant.

Kay Canter died in April 2007 at age 85. Daphne Swann died on 28 February 2020 at age 95.

The current owners have now agreed a sandwich distribution deal with Holland and Barrett in selected stores in London, and a frozen ready meal deal with Waitrose.

== Cultural influence ==
Cranks has been seen as a major factor in the spread of vegetarianism in recent decades. It attracted many celebrities who dined there, including Princess Diana, Sir Paul McCartney, Linda McCartney, and Sir Cliff Richard.

The Financial Times reported "Cranks restaurants and recipes popularised vegetarian food on the high street and in the home." In 2018, Bon Appétit journalist Julia Tausch called The Cranks Bible "the Only Vegetarian Cookbook I'll Ever Need."

Satirists and cultural critics called vegetarians "cranks" during the twentieth century but "In the 1960s, a vegetarian restaurant took the sting out of over a century of mockery by proudly adopting the name "Cranks"" reported the Cabinet Magazine. United States journalist Avery Yale Kamila of the Portland Press Herald reported Cranks is "credited with setting the tone for London’s current vibrant veg scene." Andrew Anthony of The Guardian reported about the mainstreaming of vegan food and reported "That old vegan profile ... has gone the way of Cranks restaurant and the cliche of nut roasts."

The Guardian reported on the closing of the Food for Thought vegetarian restaurant and reported "Gradually, Covent Garden became a centre for alternative eating. On Marshall Street was Cranks, a little older and duller in its treatment of vegetarian food." In 2023, Dan Carrier of the Camden New Journal called Cranks "UK’s first genuinely famous veggie restaurant."

== Menu ==
The restaurant became successful quickly, indicating unmet demand for its original menus. The Cranks menu at first consisted mainly of salads. David Canter wrote that, "In contrast to the traditional tired lettuce that makes the appetite wilt too, these salads could change the eater's whole view of vegetables. The vivid combinations of ingredients and colours, crisp from cutting and dressing, were teamed with equally fresh wholemeal rolls, savouries and puddings." Bean soups were another staple. Its carrot soup recipe is still used by some who ate at the restaurant. Other dishes were added, such as the popular nut roast, homity pie, veg crumble, and carrot cake. The Cranks cheese baps were named Best Sandwich in London by the Evening Standard. By 1998, the top selling menu items were cous cous with roasted Mediterranean vegetables and stir-fried vegetables with noodles.

=== Nut roast ===
The best-known Cranks dish was the nut roast. The Financial Times reported in 2021 "In the Cranks cookery book, nut roast is offered up as the veggie gateway drug." The recipe ingredients are one onion, butter or margarine, nuts, wholemeal bread, vegetable stock or water, yeast extract, mixed herbs, salt and pepper. The Cranks nut roast inspired nut roasts eaten in the United States.

== Books ==
- David Canter, Kay Canter, Daphne Swann, The Cranks Recipe Book, Panther, 1982
- Kay Canter and Daphne Swann, Entertaining With Cranks, Grafton Books, 1987
- Daphne Swann, Cranks Puddings & Desserts, Guinness, 1987
- Daphne Swann, Cranks Soups & Starters, Guinness,1987
- Daphne Swann, Cranks Cakes & Biscuits, Gullane Children's Books, 1988
- Daphne Swann, Cranks Breads & Teacakes, Guinness, 1988
- David Canter, Cranks' Recipe Book, Orion, 1993
- David Canter, Kay Canter, Daphne Swann, Traditional Vegetarian Cooking, Recipes from Europe's Famous Crank's Restaurant, Healing Art Press, 1991
- Nadine Abensur, The Cranks Bible: A Timeless Collection of Vegetarian Recipes, 2002

== See also ==
- List of vegetarian and vegan restaurants
- Food for Thought
