= Colin Pearson (potter) =

English studio potter and art teacher

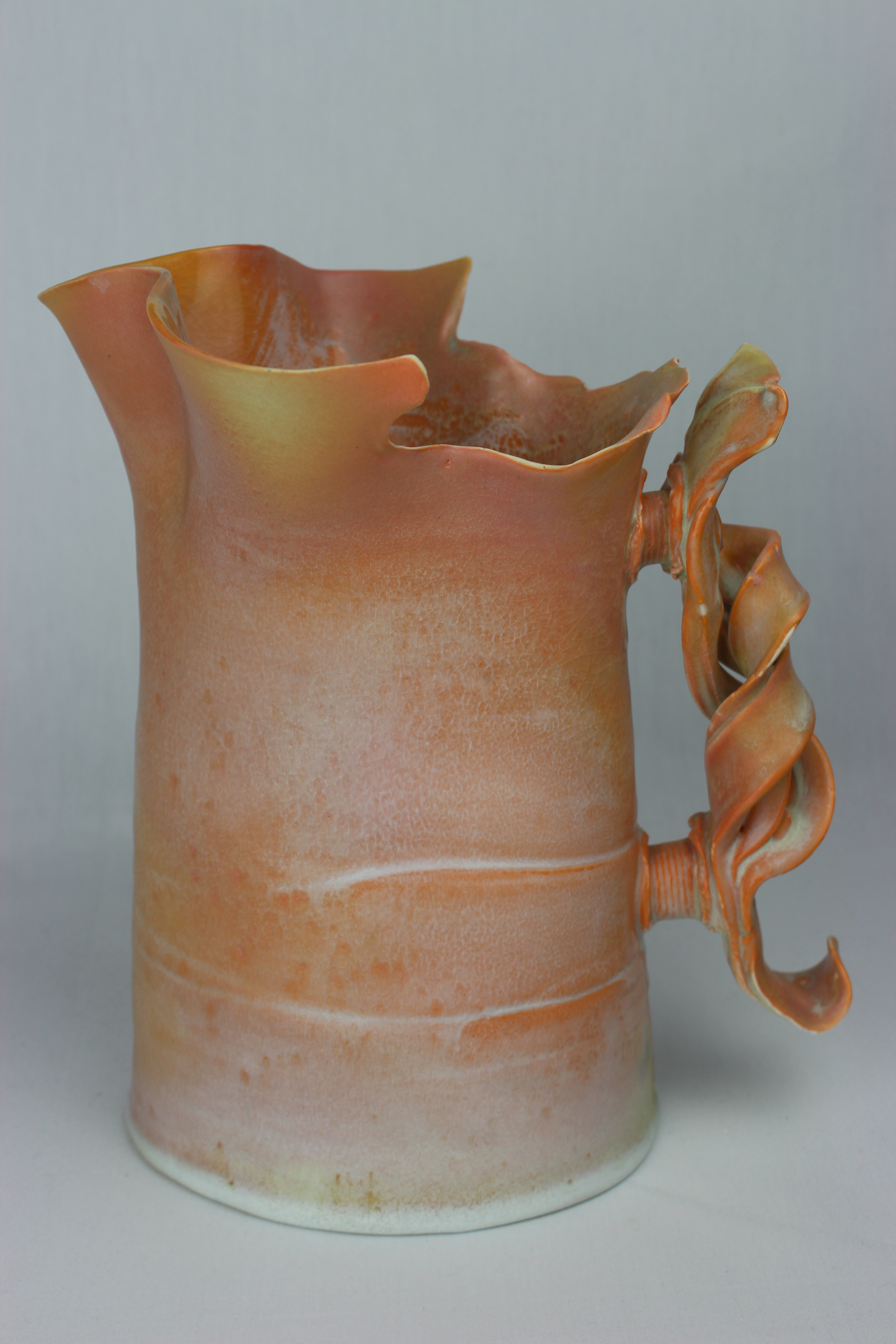
Thrown, altered jug by Colin Pearson

Colin Pearson (14 September 1923 – 3 December 2007) was an English studio potter and art teacher.

== Biography ==
Pearson was born in Friern Barnet, London in 1923 and studied at Goldsmiths College, University of London. He worked at Winchcombe Pottery under Ray Finch before going to Lambeth in 1954 to work at Royal Doulton.

In 1955 he took over as manager of Aylesford Pottery, Kent which David Leach had set up a year earlier. In 1961 he set up Quay Pottery making domestic ware in Aylesford. Pearson was awarded an honorary fellowship from the University of the Arts London in 1996.

His work is in the V&A collection and the Metropolitan Museum of Art.

He taught at Camberwell College of Arts and the Medway School of Art.
