= Alexandra Kitchin =

British photographic model of Lewis Carroll (1864-1925)

Alexandra "Xie" Rhoda Kitchin
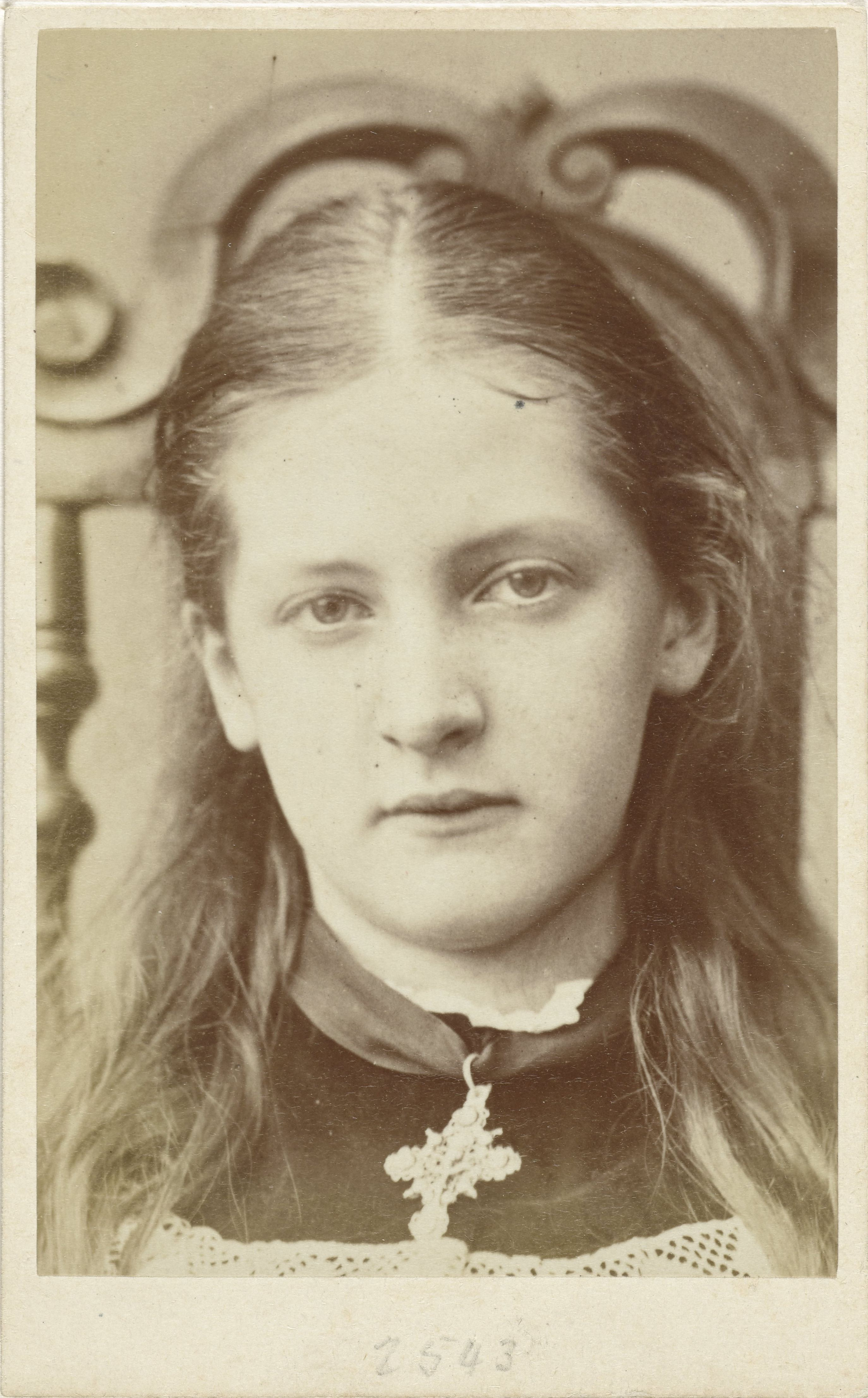
- Alexandra ‘Xie’ Kitchin on 17 July 1878, by Lewis Carroll
- Born: 29 September 1864
- Died: 6 April 1925 (aged 60); Wimbledon Common, London
- Resting place: Putney Vale Cemetery
- Known for: Favourite photographic subject of Charles Lutwidge Dodgson (Lewis Carroll)
- Spouse: Arthur Cardew (m. 1890)
- Children: 6
- Parents: George William Kitchin (father); Alice Maud Taylor (mother)
- Relatives: Michael Cardew (son)

Alexandra "Xie" Rhoda Kitchin (29 September 1864 – 6 April 1925) was a notable 'child-friend' and favourite photographic subject of Charles Lutwidge Dodgson (Lewis Carroll).

She was the daughter of Rev. George William Kitchin (1827–1912), who was Dodgson's colleague at Christ Church, Oxford, and later became Dean of Winchester and Dean of Durham. His wife, Alice Maud Taylor, was the second daughter of Bridges Taylor, the British consul in Denmark at the time of the marriage. Xie's godmother was Alexandra of Denmark, then Princess of Wales, who had been a childhood friend of her mother. Xie had three younger brothers: George Herbert, Hugh Bridges, and Brook Taylor, and a younger sister, Dorothy Maud Mary. All were featured in Dodgson's photographs.

Dodgson photographed her around fifty times, from age four until just before her sixteenth birthday. The works they made together, often in tableau form, are commonly known to collectors, curators, and the contemporary artists who are inspired by them as the 'Xie' (pronounced 'Ecksy' — a diminutive form of Alexandra) pictures.

It is commonly reported that Carroll once posed the question “How do you achieve excellence in photography?” and then provided this answer: “Put Xie in front of a Lens.” In truth, in a letter to her on June 16, 1880, he writes, "Here is a riddle—'What is the best way to secure Excellence in a photograph?' Answer: 'First you take a "lence," and then put "ecce" before it.'" He is punning on "ecce," the Latin word for "behold."

She married Arthur Cardew, a civil servant, antiques dealer and gifted amateur musician, on 17 April 1890. They had six children: Penelope (b. 1891), Christopher (b. 1894), Richard (1898–1918), Michael (1901–1983), Philip (b. 1903) and Arthur (b. 1906). Composer Cornelius Cardew was her grandson. The family resided at 4 North View, Wimbledon Common, London, until Xie's death; they also had a country home at Saunton. She is buried at Putney Vale Cemetery.

Unlike Alice Liddell, Isa Bowman and other Dodgson 'child-friends', Xie never published reminiscences of him.

== In popular culture ==
- Subject of the play Xie by Justin Sherin.

== Gallery ==
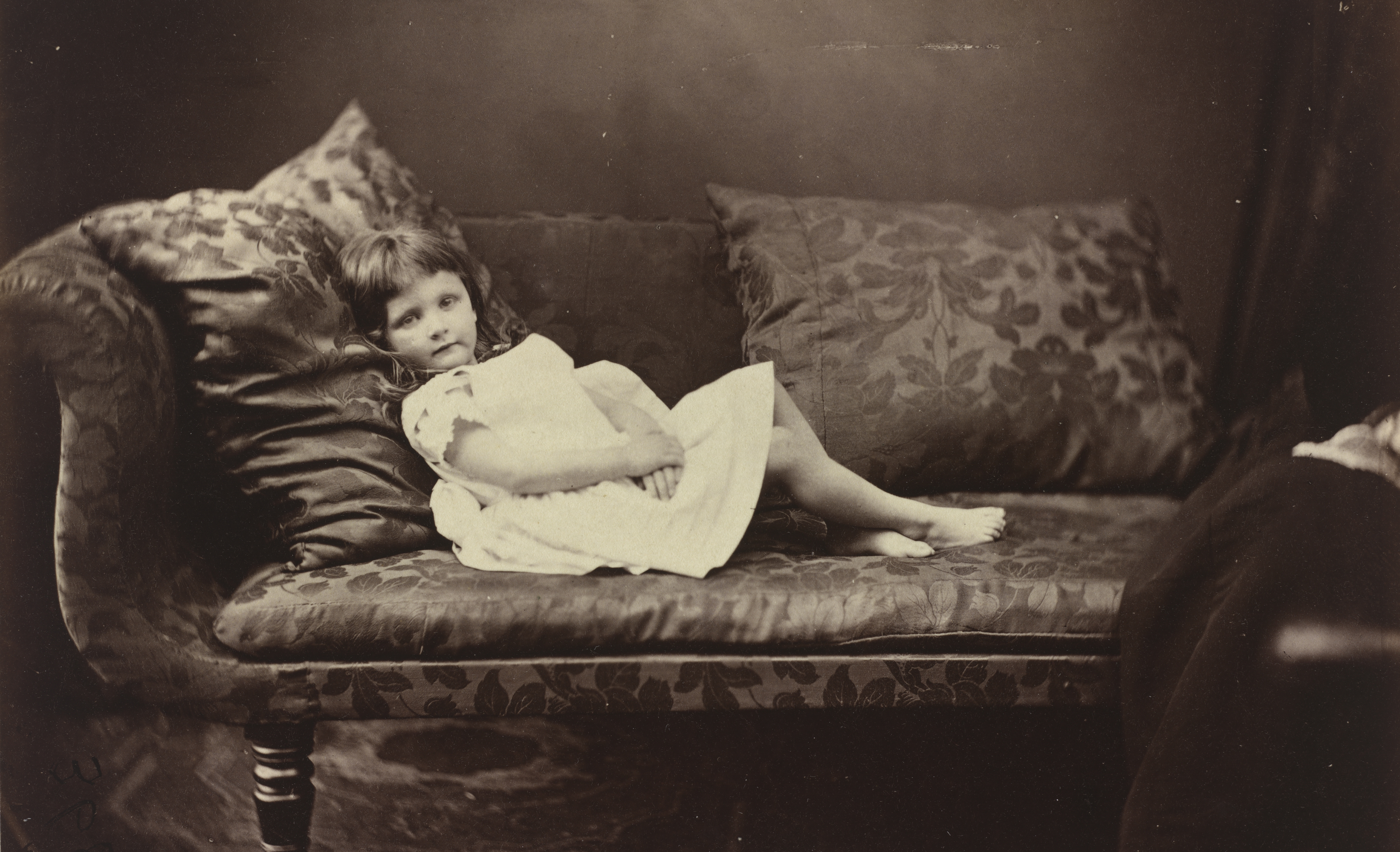
Xie Kitchin by Lewis Carroll, 1869.

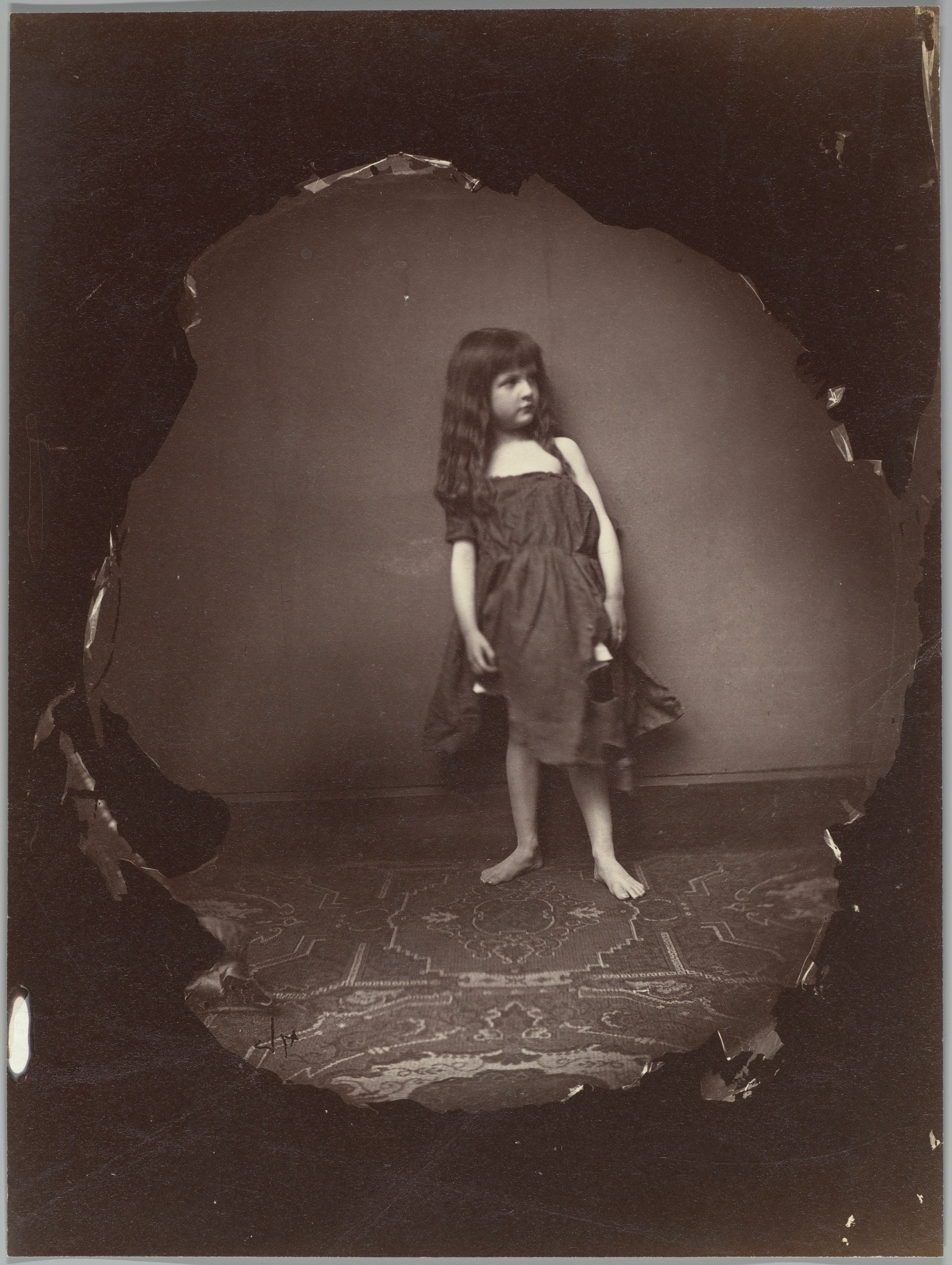
Xie Kitchin in The Prettiest Doll in the World by Lewis Carroll on 5 July 1870.

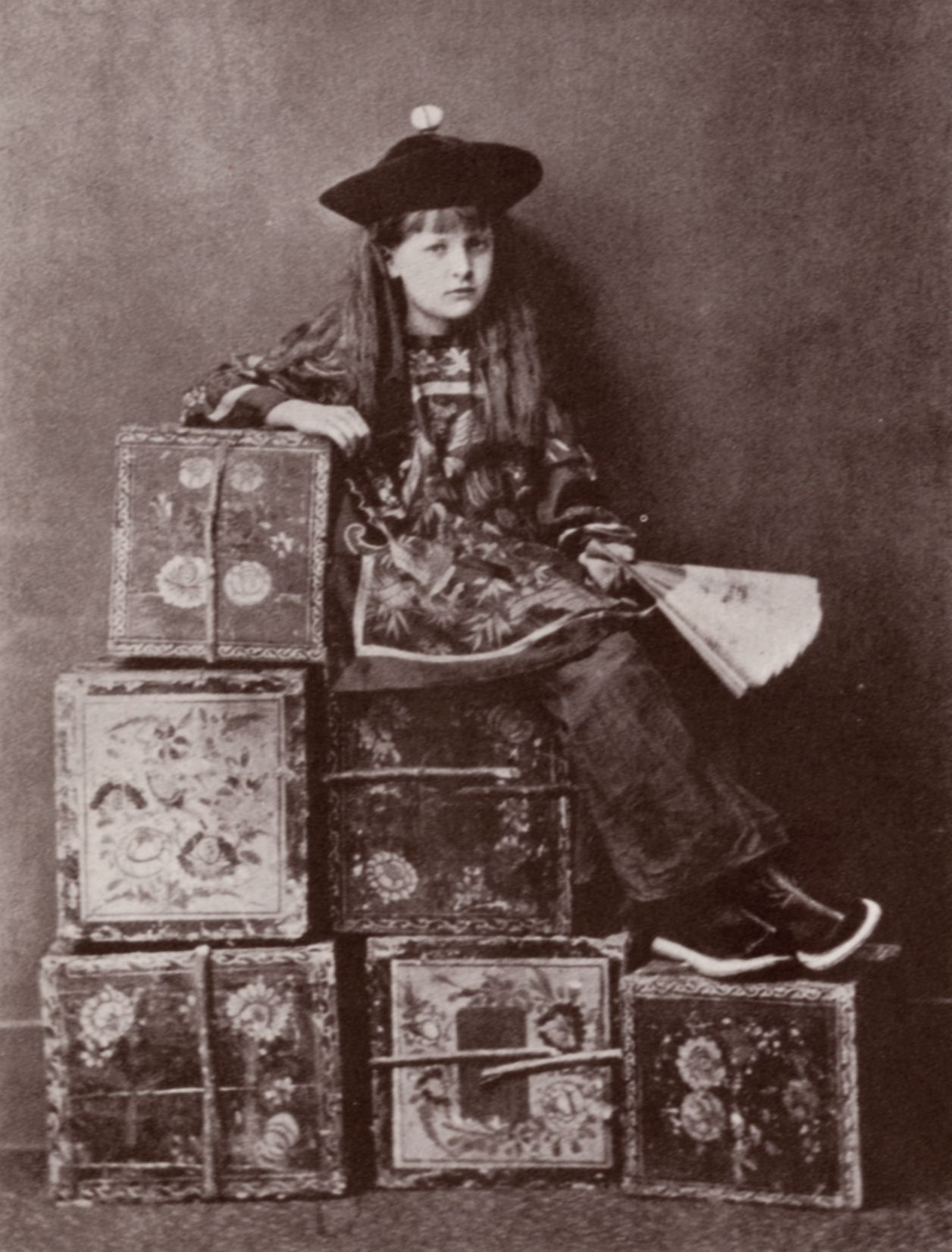
Xie Kitchin in Tea merchant (on duty) by Lewis Carroll on 14 July 1873.

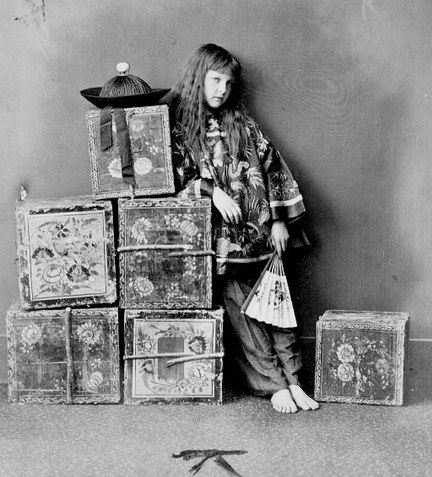
Xie Kitchin in Tea merchant (off duty) by Lewis Carroll on 14 July 1873.

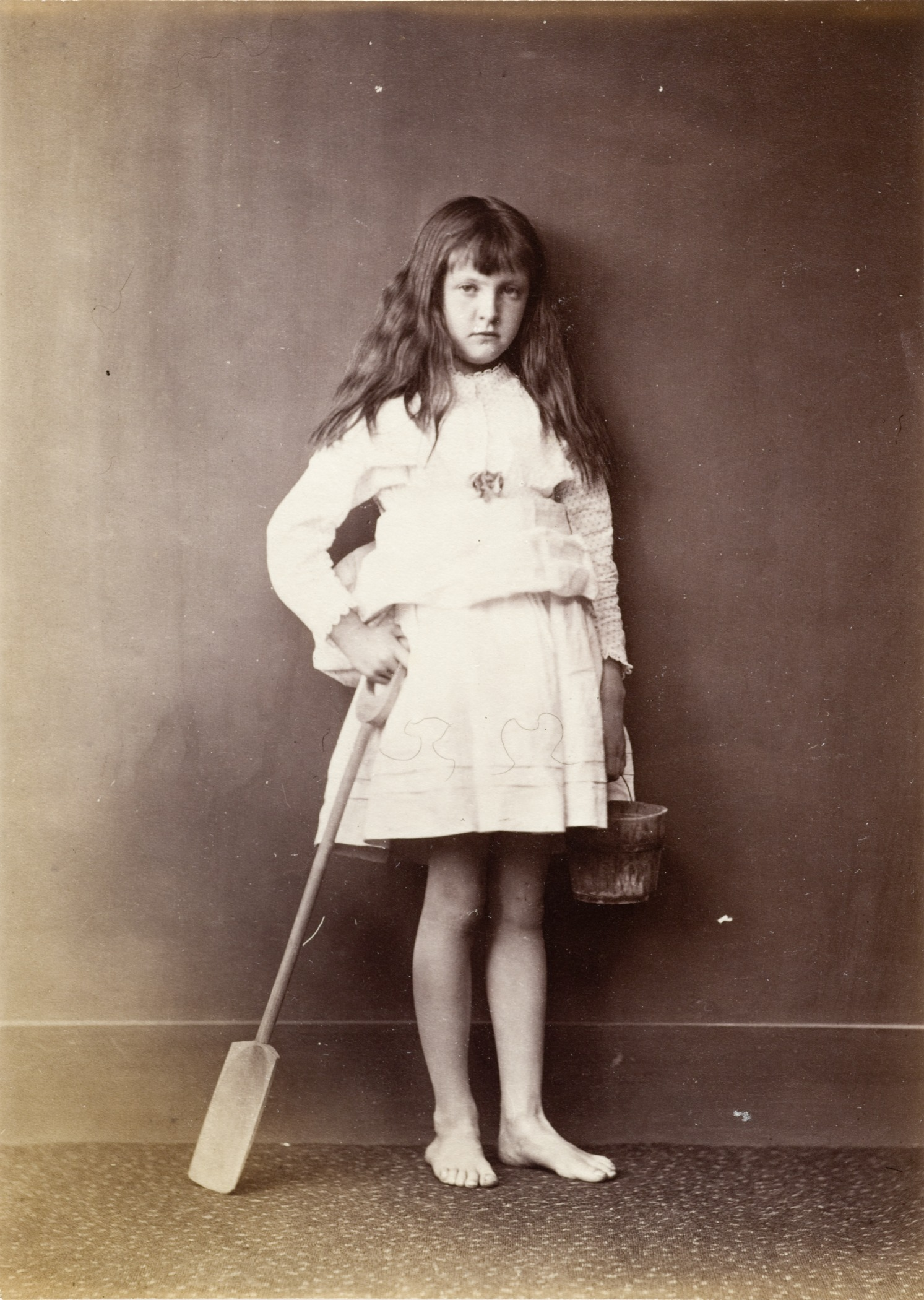
Xie Kitchin with Bucket and Spade by Lewis Carroll in 1873.

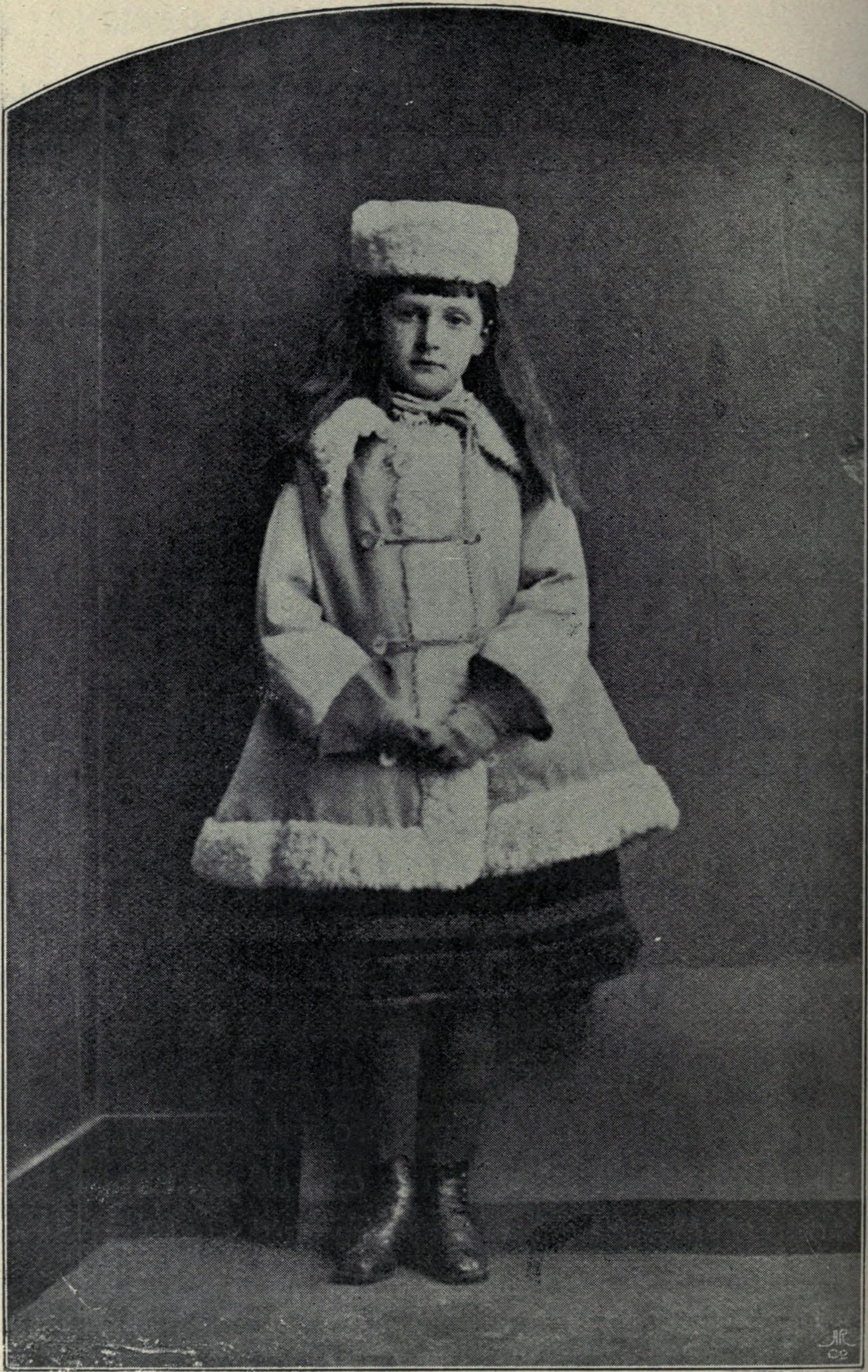
Xie Kitchin as 'Dane' by Lewis Carroll, 1873.

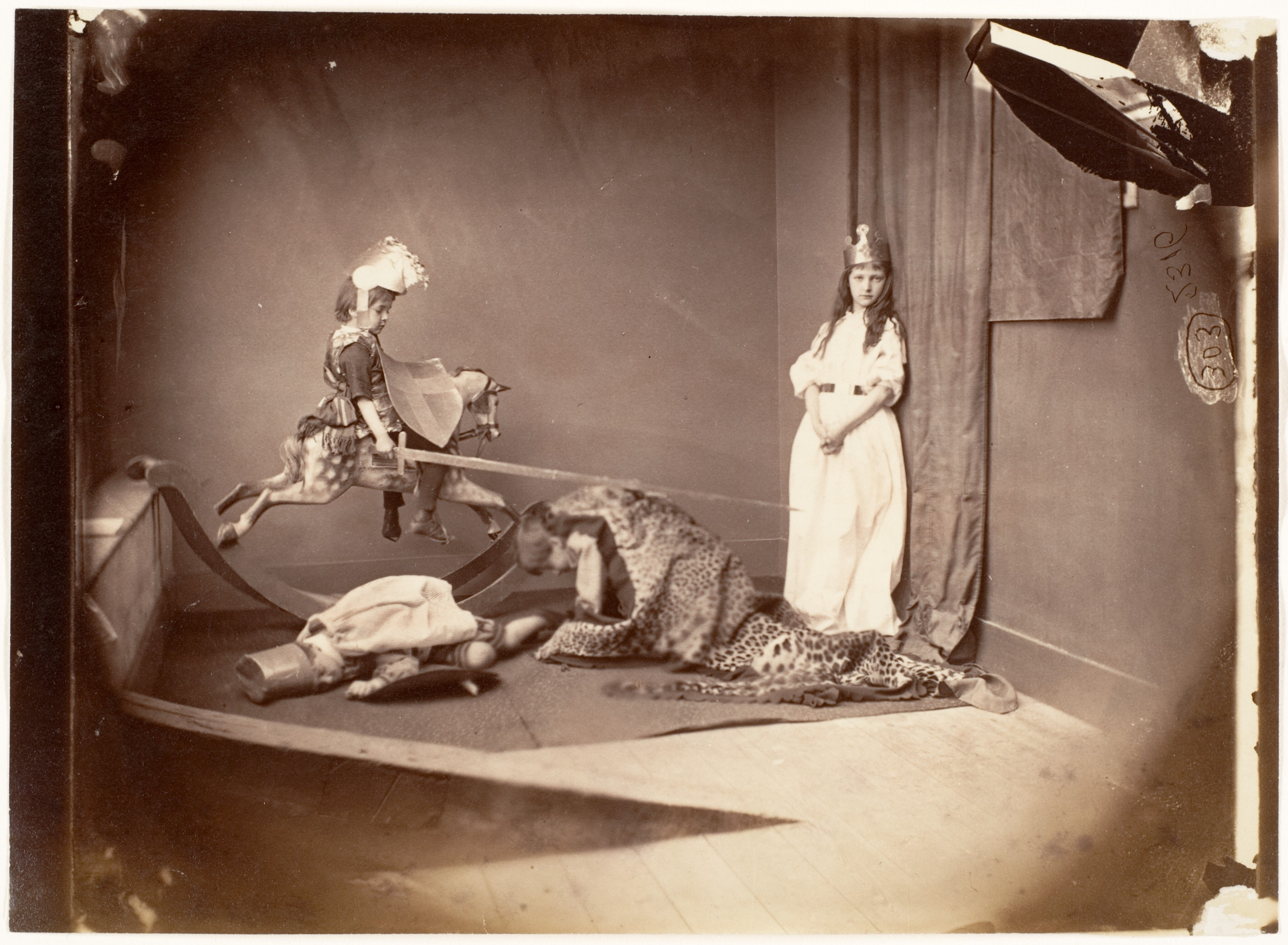
Xie Kitchin as a princess, her brother Brook Taylor Kitchin as Saint George, her brother George Herbert Kitchin as the slain soldier, and her brother Hugh Bridges Kitchin wrapped in the leopard skin rug in St. George and the Dragon on 26 June 1875 by Lewis Carroll.

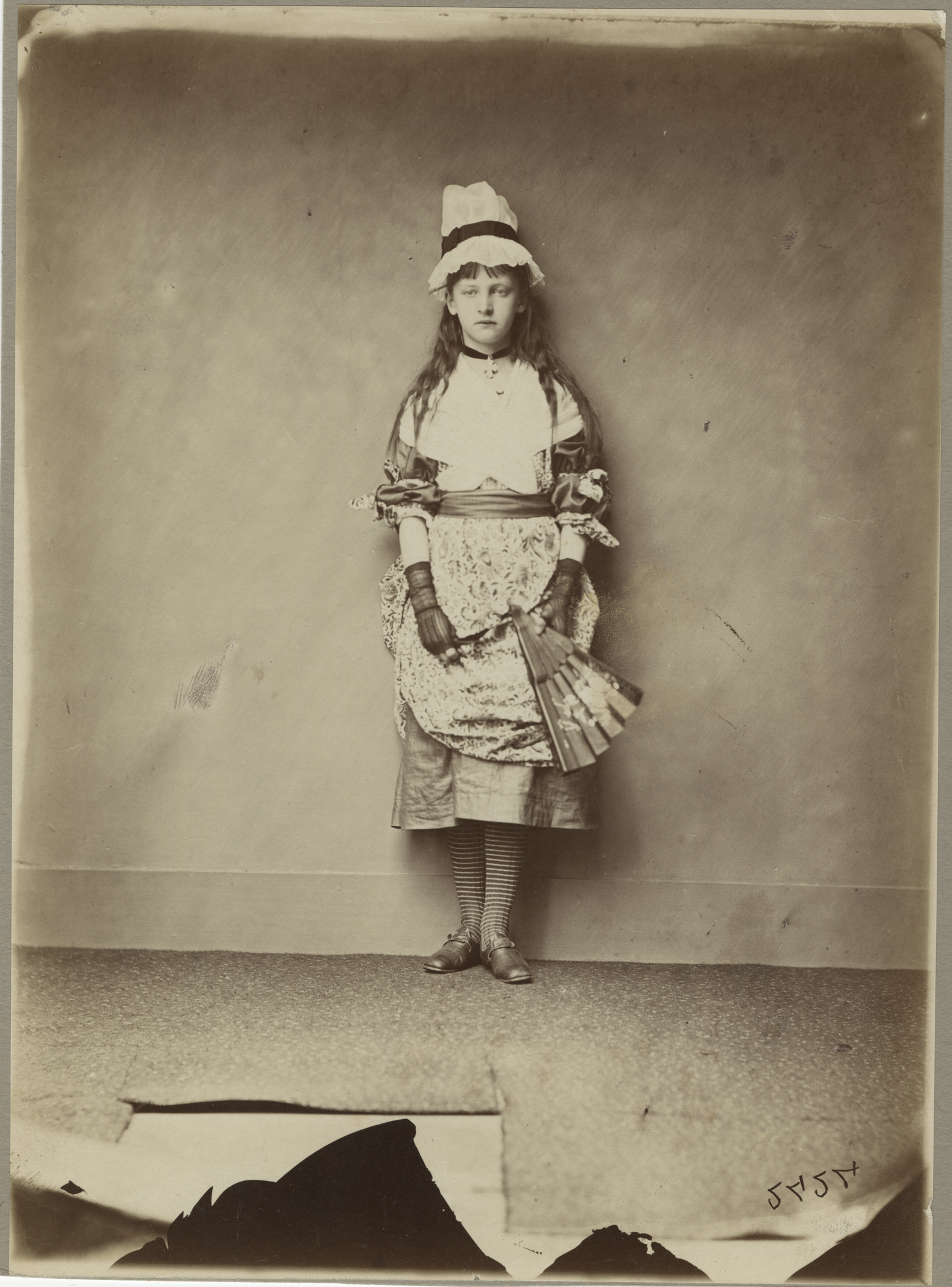
Xie Kitchin as Penelope Boothby , by Lewis Carroll on 1 July 1876.

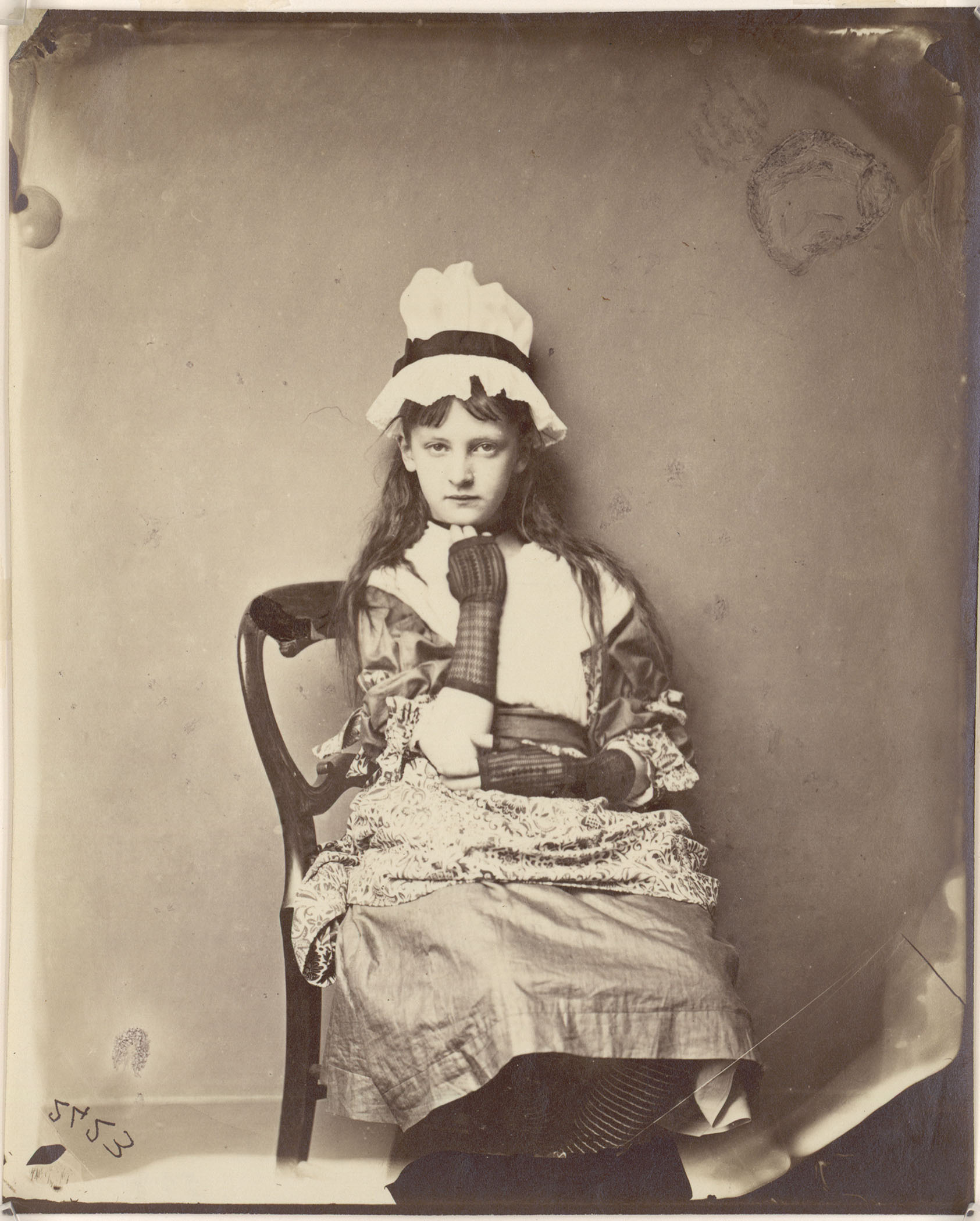
Xie Kitchin as Penelope Boothby by Lewis Carroll on 1 July 1876.

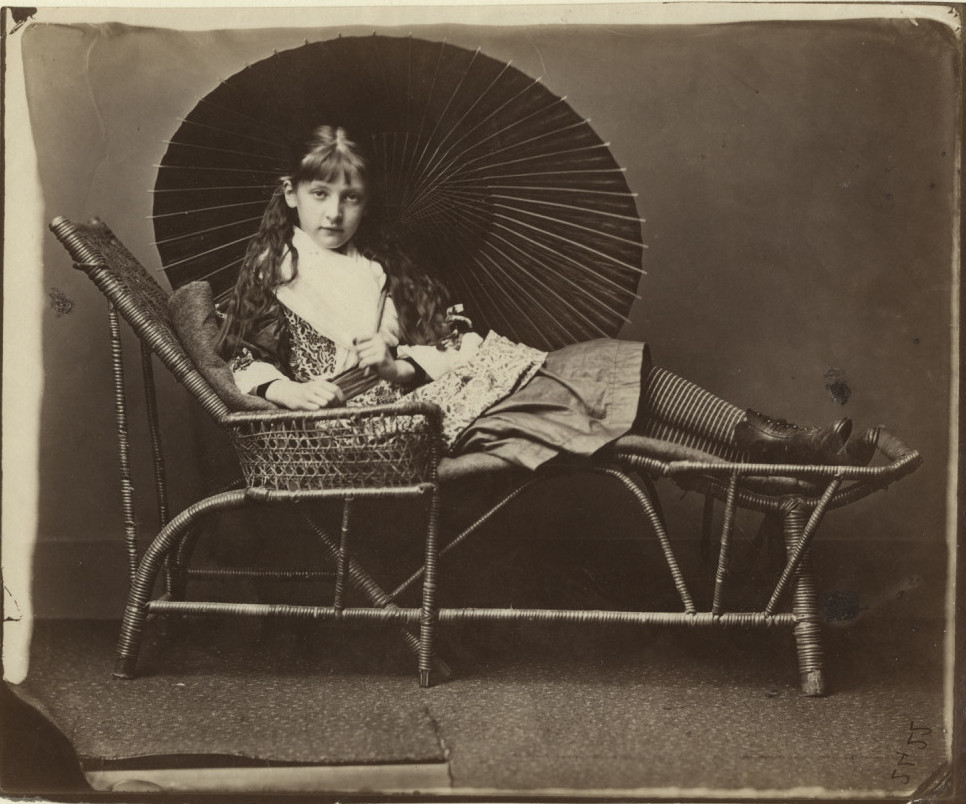
Xie Kitchin partly in the Penelope Boothby dress, on a garden chair, with a Japanese sunshade, by Lewis Carroll on 1 July 1876.
