= Lucy Finch =

Malawian nurse and hospice founder

- Born: Lucy Kishindo; 1943 (age 82–83); Malawi
- Occupation: Palliative nurse
- Organization: hospice Ndi Moyo

Lucy Finch (born 1943) is a palliative nurse who has worked in several African countries and founded a hospice in Malawi – Ndi Moyo – "the place giving life".

== Early life ==
Born Lucy Kishindo in Malawi in 1943, she was the eldest of 11 children of an Anglican primary school teacher. She was educated at mission schools in southern Malawi and trained as a nurse in the UK.

== Nursing ==
In September 1964, Lucy travelled to Scotland to study nursing at the South Edinburgh School of Nursing. In 1969, she met and married Tony Finch, son of the potter Ray Finch. He worked for the Forestry Commission around the world and Lucy travelled with him, working as a nurse in Britain, Tanzania, Uganda and Zambia. In 1997, while her husband was based in Kampala, Lucy Finch began volunteering at Hospice Africa Uganda, where she worked with Dr Anne Merriman in her pioneering, palliative care programme. A year later, she returned to Malawi to nurse her sister, who was dying of HIV-related meningitis. In the same hospital, a young man was dying in great pain and distress with no adequate pain relief. Lucy Finch vowed then, that with the knowledge and skills that she had, she would never again allow herself to be in that position where she could not help somebody who was suffering.

== Ndi Moyo ==
In 2002, Lucy and Tony Finch returned to Malawi and she began to help local patients, providing them with paracetamol and other assistance. In 2005, her family and friends in the UK founded a charity to raise funds to support the work that she had started. After gathering resources, the hospice Ndi Moyo – "the place giving life" – was opened in the Salima District in 2007 by the Minister of Health, Marjorie Ngaunje. In 2016, it was the only hospice in all of Malawi. (Note: Some sources say that the hospice was the first in Malawi but a Peace Corps nurse, Mary Jane Lucas, started a similar small hospice when she was there from 1999 to 2001.) As of 2016, Ndi Moyo treats about 330 patients; trains and mentors health professionals; runs outreach clinics; and advocates for better end-of-life care. It provides home-based, patient-centred, holistic care to patients who would otherwise have little access to pain relief or end-of-life support. According to 2015 estimates, approximately 1 million people in Malawi are living with HIV/AIDS and many of these patients develop cancers in a country that has no curative public health cancer treatment.

== Recognition ==
In 2013, Lucy Finch was recognised by Hospice Africa Uganda for her outstanding support in the promotion and development of palliative care in Uganda. In 2015, she was awarded a Certificate of Recognition by the Right Honourable Dr Peter Kumpalume, the Malawi Minister for Health. In 2016, she was recognised as one of the BBC's 100 Women for her work caring for the dying.
