= H. V. Meyerowitz =

Herbert Vladimir Meyerowitz (1900 in Saint Petersburg – 1945 in London) was an artist, educator and British colonial administrator in South Africa and Basutoland (modern-day Lesotho), and then later in the British Gold Coast colony.

== Early life ==
Meyerowitz's father was a wealthy German businessman and his mother a Russian pianist who had studied with Arthur Rubinstein.

At the time of the Russian Revolution of 1905, the family moved from Russia to Switzerland, where Meyerowitz was educated at a Pestalozzi school. His education was completed in England, with holidays in Russia. The family were in Russia when the First World War broke out in 1914 and, because of their German nationality, they were interned at Ekaterinburg. They moved to Berlin in 1916 as part of a prisoner exchange between Russia and Germany. In 1918, Meyerowitz served briefly in the German army.

After the war, he returned to Berlin to study art. Together with his future wife, Eva Lewin-Richter, he developed an enthusiasm for the art of West Africa. Meyerowitz went on to study woodcarving at the Berlin Kunstgewerbeschule. He became an admirer of the educational theories of Franz Cižek.

== Work in South Africa and Lesotho ==
On the completion of his art training, Meyerowitz moved to South Africa with his wife Eva, where he established a reputation as a wood sculptor. He taught for five years at Cape Town University and opened a school of art.

In 1935, he made a study of the crafts in Basutoland (now Lesotho), which he wrote up in A Report on the Possibilities of the Development of Village Crafts in Basutoland (Morija Printing Works, 1936). He organised an exhibition of African arts and crafts as part of the International Educational Conference in Salisbury, Rhodesia. He said in a speech that the traditional African art on show was "good, because it still fulfilled its purpose", but that the work brought in from the schools and institutions was "trash ... which we, in the name of education, had inflicted on the people of Africa".

== Move to Ghana ==
The Rev. H. M. Grace, the Principal of Achimota College in the Gold Coast (now Ghana), offered Meyerowitz the job of arts and crafts supervisor. Achimota College had been founded in 1927 as a selective boarding school to train an African élite. It combined Western educational methods with the study of local customs, languages, biology and geography.

Meyerowitz and Eva made a survey of the indigenous crafts of the Gold Coast, which they found to be in decline. At Achimota, he replaced Western-style art classes based on academic drawing with an arts and crafts approach based on local skills and traditions.

== Institute of West African Arts ==
From 1937, Meyerowitz began to develop a scheme for an Institute of West African Arts, Industries and Social Sciences, which would be a "marriage of the aesthetic skill and power to modern technique". It would investigate local arts and crafts, teach certain native crafts in the light of European experience and create local craft industries. It would also investigate local history, tribal life, customs, religion and economic conditions. This scheme was approved by the West African Governors' Conference at Lagos in 1939 and the Advisory Committee on Education in 1940. Before the Second World War, African colonies had depended on the export of commodities, which was made almost impossible by enemy shipping. The Colonial Office adopted instead a policy developing indigenous industries and eventually accepted Meyerowitz's idea. In 1943, the institute was set up under the direction of the Rev. Robert Stopford. Meyerowitz's colleague Michael Cardew records that only the power of Meyerowitz's "magnetic eloquence (backed up by the pressure of the war) could have persuaded the Colonial Office to support the project and the Treasury to release the necessary funds."

Meyerowitz planned the institute on the basis of production units that would combine the arts with industry. "If industries are to be established for West African needs," he argued, "the only alternative to white capital and coloured labour is a self-contained development of the kind now proposed; and the people as a whole benefit more from many local production units on a co-operative basis than from concentrated industrial centres".

In 1936, on the recommendation of the English studio potter Michael Cardew, Meyerowitz appointed Harry Davis to teach pottery at Achimota and expand the pottery department to manufacture bricks, tiles, water coolers and glazed ware. The college also produced textiles. Davis resigned in 1942, and was replaced by Cardew, who undertook a large expansion of the pottery on a site at Alajo, with the aim of creating a profitable business that would meet all the pottery needs of West Africa, including that of the British Army. The pottery made continuing losses and the educated Africans who worked as apprentices found little to admire in Cardew's studio pottery approach.

Grace had retired from the college in 1940, depriving Meyerowitz of a useful ally. Stopford returned to England in 1945. The financial losses at the Institute brought its future into question.

== Death ==
While in London in 1945, Meyerowitz discovered that his mother, who had remained in Russia, had died in the Siege of Leningrad. He died by suicide in the same year, dying at home, 12 Girdlers Road, London W14.

The inquest recorded that he had suffered from "manic depressive cyclothymia". Shortly after his death, the Institute of West African Arts was closed.
