= Sydney Nicholson =

British musician (1875–1947)

Sir Sydney Hugo Nicholson MVO (9 February 1875 – 30 May 1947) was an English choir director, organist, composer, and founder of the Royal School of Church Music (RSCM) and the compiler of The Parish Psalter.

== Life ==
Nicholson was born in London to Sir Charles Nicholson, 1st Baronet, and his wife, Sarah Elizabeth Nicholson (née Keightley). His elder brother was the architect Sir Charles Nicholson; his younger brother was the stained-glass artist Archibald Keightley Nicholson.

Sydney was educated at New College, Oxford before going on to study the organ at the Royal College of Music. He then served as organist at Barnet Parish Church (1897–1903), Carlisle Cathedral (1904), Lower Chapel, Eton College (1904–1908), Manchester Cathedral (1908–1919), and Westminster Abbey (1919–1928). Along with maintaining his organist posts, he edited the Hymns Ancient and Modern supplement that was published in 1916; he did not live to see the 1950 revised edition.

In 1927 Nicholson founded the School of English Church Music (now the RSCM). The School's members initially met at St Sepulchre-without-Newgate.

One of Nicholson's most successful compositions for parish choirs was his Communion Service in G, which was widely sung, especially in Anglo-Catholic churches, until recent times. He was warden of St Nicholas College, Chislehurst, Kent (1928–1939).

In addition to having edited Hymns Ancient and Modern, still the standard hymn book in many Anglican churches today, Nicholson wrote several hymn tunes. Of these, the most famous are Crucifer for the popular processional hymn Lift High the Cross and Totteridge. In 1928 he received the Lambeth DMus, and a decade later he was knighted for his services to Church music. He died at Ashford, Kent at the age of 72, and was buried at Westminster Abbey.

== Works ==
=== Books on Church Music ===
- Church Music (1920) London: Faith Press
- Boys' Choirs (1922) Glasgow
- Church Music A Practical Handbook (1927) London: Faith Press
- In Quires and Places where they sing (1932) London: Bell
- Peter: Adventures of a chorister 1137-1937 (1944) London: SPCK (fiction)
- Practical Methods of Choir Training (1947) London: SPCK (now RSCM)
- The Elements of Extemporisation (n.d.) Croydon: RSCM

=== Other books ===
- British Songs for British Boys (1903 with several later reprints). A collection of one hundred and eight national songs. Macmillan and Company, London .

=== Anthems ===
- An Ode on the Birth of our Saviour
- Beloved, Let Us Love One Another (1922)
- Cleanse us, O Lord
- God be in my head
- Let us with a gladsome mind
- Love divine, all loves excelling
- My song is love unknown
- Teach us, good Lord, to serve Thee (boys' voices)

=== Cantata ===
- The Saviour of the World

=== Canticles ===
- Evening Service in D-flat major
- Evening Service in F for Two Trebles (or Women's) Voices
- Evening Service on Parisian Tones
- Communion Service in G major
- Jubilate in F major (boys' voices)

=== Hymn tunes ===
- AIRLIE
- BOW BRICKHILL
- CHISLEHURST
- CRUCIFER
- FENITON
- HOSANNA IN EXCELSIS
- LYTLINGTON
- TOTTERIDGE
- TRAFALGAR

=== Opera ===
- The Boy Bishop: an Opera for Boys (1926)

=== Chamber ===
- Piano Quintet in E Major

Cultural offices
Preceded by E. G. Mercer	Organist of Carlisle Cathedral; 1904-1910	Succeeded by Frederick William Wadely
Preceded by James Kendrick Pyne	Organist and Master of the Choristers of Manchester Cathedral; 1908–1919	Succeeded by Archibald Wilson
Preceded by Frederick Bridge	Organist and Master of the Choristers of Westminster Abbey; 1919–1928	Succeeded by Ernest Bullock
