= Food for Thought (restaurant) =

Vegetarian restaurant

Food For Thought

- Location within Central London

Restaurant information
- Established: 1971
- Owner: Vanessa Garrett
- Previous owner: Margot Boyce-White
- Food type: vegetarian
- Location: 31 Neal Street, London, WC2H 9PR
- Coordinates: 51.5142473°N 0.1255163°W
- Seating capacity: 40
- Website: Archived 5 February 2020 at the Wayback Machine

Food for Thought was a vegetarian restaurant in the Seven Dials district of London's Covent Garden. Founded in 1971 in a former banana warehouse, it later closed in 2015 due to rising rents.

== History ==
The restaurant was founded by Australian Margot Boyce-White in 1971, when the relocation of London's fruit and vegetable market to New Covent Garden caused the area to be redeveloped. The premises in Neal Street had formerly been used as a banana-ripening warehouse. The business changed hands in 1977 when John and Jane Damant purchased the restaurant, and Jane's daughter Vanessa Garrett later took over. Rising rents caused the restaurant to close on 21 June 2015.

The counter-culture activist Sue Miles worked at Food for Thought, so starting a career as a restaurateur.

The restaurant was patronised by workers in the nearby businesses of the Covent Garden district, which included the numerous theatres. Acts which ate there included the Red Hot Chili Peppers.

A former stable and forge in Denmark Street was used by the proprietors of the restaurant as a storage area and sleeping quarters. This was then used by Andy's Guitars as an amplifier workshop and the testing there then developed into the famous 12 Bar Club.

== Cuisine ==
The food at the restaurant was vegetarian and some of it was vegan. Fresh vegetables were used but, to keep the cost down, these were not normally organic. The preparation avoided peeling to preserve the nutrients in the skin of the vegetables.

Two different cookbooks, composed of the restaurant's recipes, were written by the head chef Jane Noraika (formerly Jane Stimpson). New Food for Thought: A New Era in Vegetarian Cuisine was first published in 1994, with a revised and expanded second edition released in 2002, titled New Food for Thought: Over 200 Recipes from London's Original Vegetarian Restaurant (originally named More Food for Thought, prior to publication).

== Reception ==
Russell Rose, reviewing the place for Veggie & Organic London, rated it five stars for vegetarian choice and three stars for taste.

This is a remarkable bargain basement vegetarian eaterie on one of Covent Garden's busiest thoroughfares. ... Food For Thought is a bit rushed but for a really cheap bite, in the middle of London's theatreland, it's tough to beat.

== Gallery ==
The restaurant's counter and tables were in the basement.

A lunch dish of soup and salad served on stoneware

Patrons would commonly queue up the stairs ...

... and squeeze into the cubbyhole

Vanessa Garrett (right) on the last day

== See also ==
- List of restaurants in London
- List of vegetarian and vegan restaurants
- Cranks
