= Lift High the Cross =

19th-century English Christian hymn

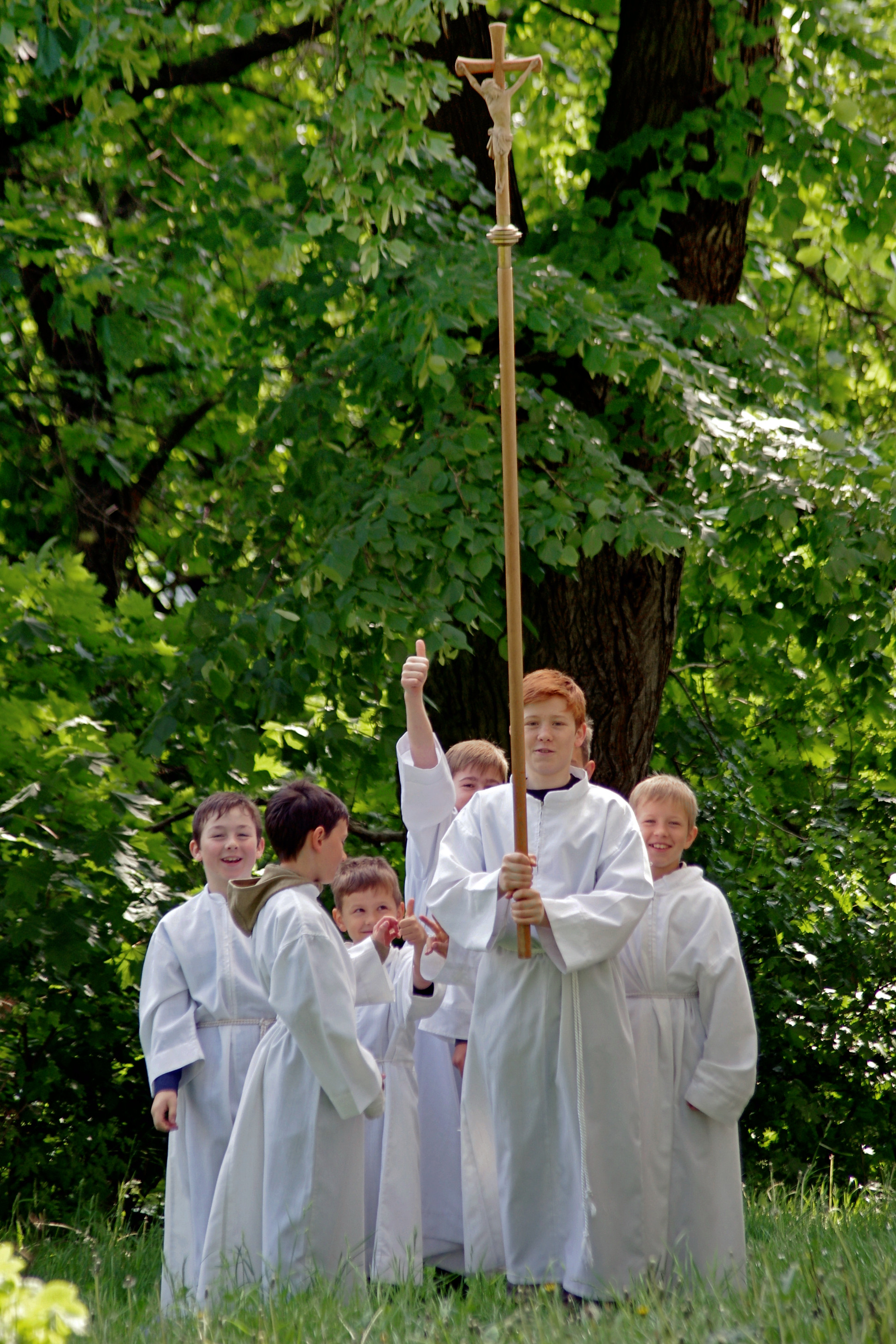
- A crucifer with other altar boys
- Genre: Hymn
- Written: 1887
- Text: George Kitchin
- Based on: Matthew 16:24
- Meter: 10.10 with refrain
- Melody: "Crucifer" by Sydney Nicholson

"Lift High the Cross" is a 19th century English Christian hymn. It was written in 1887 by George Kitchin and revised in 1916 by Michael R. Newbolt.

== History ==
Kitchin wrote "Lift High the Cross" in 1887, while he was the Church of England Dean of Winchester, for the Society for the Propagation of the Gospel. It has been suggested that the hymn was inspired by the story of Constantine the Great's conversion to Christianity after seeing a cross with "In hoc signo vinces" on it. It was intended as a festival hymn and was first performed in Winchester Cathedral. In 1916, Newbolt revised the hymn so that it was in twelve couplets and it was printed in the 1916 Supplement to Hymns Ancient and Modern. In that same revision, "Lift High the Cross" was set to the tune of "Crucifer" by Sydney Nicholson. The hymn is often sung during Lent or Holy Week but is also used as a processional hymn or recessional hymn before or after a church service.

"Lift High the Cross" was first published in the United States in 1974 by Donald Hustad in Hymns for the Living Church and since then has appeared in a number of different hymnals outside England. In 1978 it appeared in the Lutheran Book of Worship, the hymnal for the Evangelical Lutheran Church in America. In 1982 it appeared in Lutheran Worship, the hymnal for the Lutheran Church-Missouri Synod. In 1989 the hymn was included in The United Methodist Hymnal, but with a replacement first verse as the original was considered to be too militaristic.

== Critical analysis ==
A recording of the hymn tune, played on the organ.

The lyrics of "Lift High the Cross" have been subject to discussion. Stanley L. Osbourne wrote that the hymn's "images are biblical, its moods expectant, its promises courageous, and its demands costly" while stating that the cross in the hymn is a symbol of the love of Jesus. However, there has been a view from Christian scholars that the hymn is an endorsement of the Gospel of John's description of the Passion (remembered on Good Friday) and focuses on the cross as a source of agony rather than as a throne of Jesus. Usage of the hymn on Easter Sunday is often contextualized as the cross being a sign of resurrection rather than of death and shame.
