= Michael Cardew =

English studio potter (1901–1983)

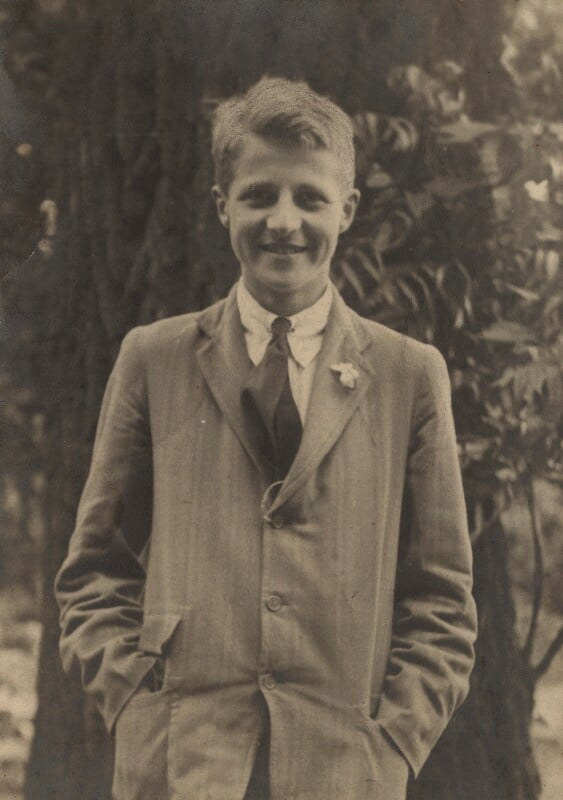
Cardew in 1917

A slipware cider flagon Michael Cardew made at the Winchcombe Pottery, c.1935.

Michael Ambrose Cardew CBE (1901–1983), was an English studio potter who worked in West Africa for twenty years.

== Early life ==
Cardew was born in Wimbledon, London, the fourth child of Arthur Cardew, a civil servant, and Alexandra Kitchin, the eldest daughter of George William Kitchin, the first Chancellor of Durham University. His family had a holiday home in North Devon, where Arthur Cardew collected Devon country pottery. Cardew first saw this pottery being made by Edwin Beer Fishley at Fremington Pottery and learned to make pottery on the wheel from Fishley's grandson, William Fishley Holland.

He gained a scholarship to read Classics at Exeter College, Oxford and graduated with a third class degree in 1923.

== St Ives and Wenford Bridge ==
Cardew was the first apprentice at the Leach Pottery, St Ives, Cornwall, in 1923. He shared an interest in slipware with Bernard Leach and was influenced by the pottery of Shoji Hamada. In 1926 he left St Ives to restart the Greet Potteries at Winchcombe in Gloucestershire. With the help of former chief thrower Elijah Comfort and fourteen-year-old Sidney Tustin, he set about rebuilding the derelict pottery. Cardew aimed to make pottery in the 17th-century English slipware tradition, functional and affordable by people with moderate incomes. After some experimentation, pottery was made with local clay and fired in a traditional bottle kiln. Charlie Tustin joined the team in 1935 followed in 1936 by Ray Finch, who bought the pottery from Cardew in 1946 and worked there until he died in 2012. The pottery is now known as Winchcombe Pottery.

Cardew married the painter Mariel Russell in 1933. They had three sons, Seth (1934–2016), Cornelius (1936–1981) and Ennis (b. 1938).

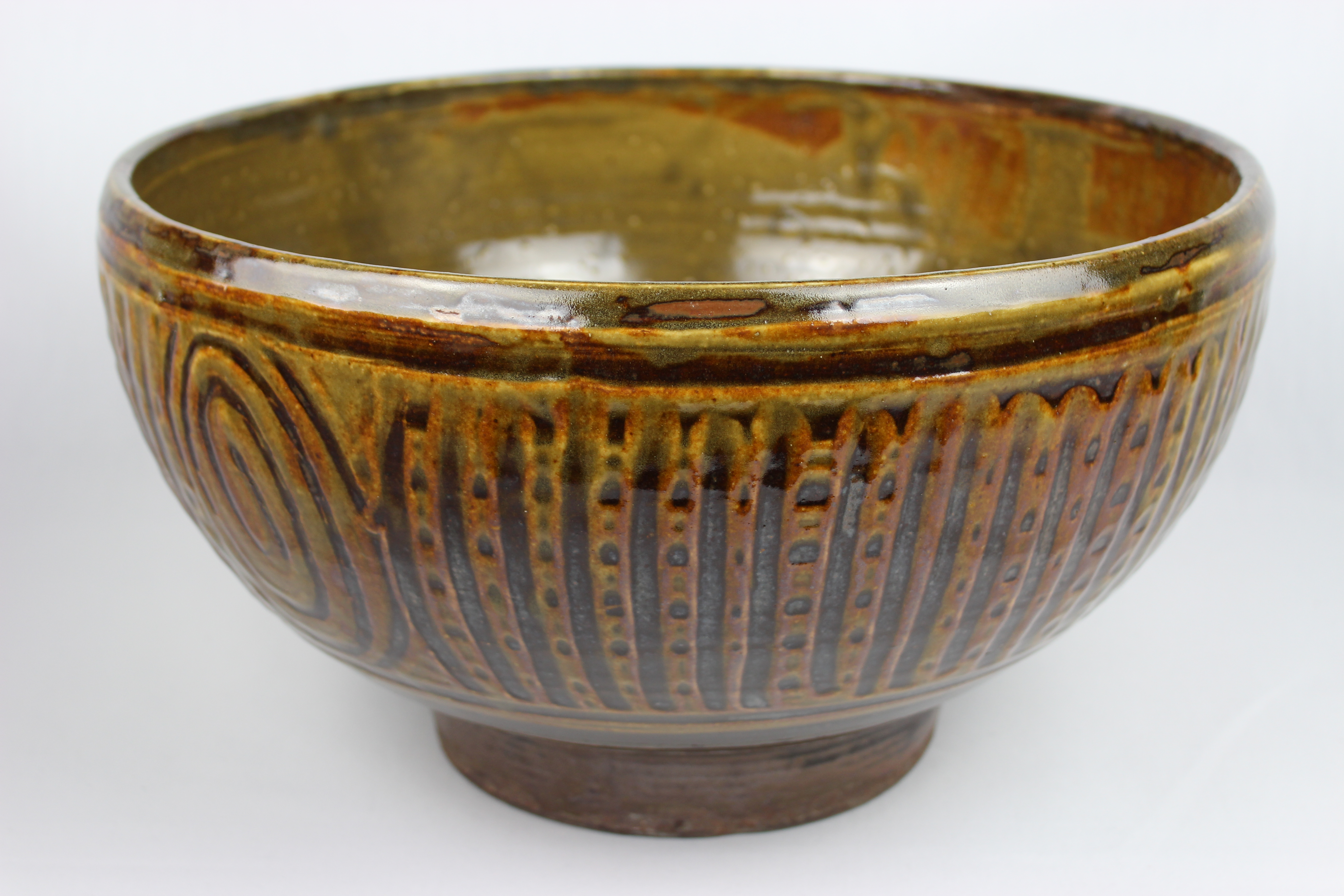
Thrown Bowl by Michael Cardew

In 1939, an inheritance enabled Cardew to fulfill his dream of living and working in Cornwall. He bought an inn at Wenford Bridge, St Breward, and converted it to a pottery, where he produced earthenware and stoneware. He built the first kiln at Wenford Bridge with the help of Michael Leach, Bernard Leach's son. It was fired only a few times before the outbreak of the Second World War, when blackout restrictions brought work to an end. In 1950 an Australian potter, Ivan McMeekin, became a partner and ran the pottery while Cardew was in Africa. McMeekin built a downdraught kiln and produced stoneware there until 1954.

Wenford Bridge Pottery

== Africa ==
Wenford Bridge did not make enough money to support Cardew and his family, and in 1942 he accepted a salaried post in the Colonial Service as a ceramist at Achimota School, an élite school for Africans in the Gold Coast (now Ghana). Although Cardew's main motivation for taking the post was financial, he had become convinced (partly through his reading of Marx) that there should be a closer relationship between the studio potter and industry. Following the outbreak of war, the school's supervisor of arts and crafts, H. V. Meyerowitz, recommended that the pottery department should expand into a handcraft-based industry that might provide all the pottery needs of British West Africa. African colonies had hitherto depended on the export of commodities, but enemy shipping made this almost impossible. The Colonial Office adopted instead a policy developing indigenous industries and eventually accepted Meyerowitz's idea. They agreed to fund the Achimota pottery, which they intended should become profitable, and hired Cardew to build and manage it in nearby Alajo. This gave him the opportunity to apply his ideas on an industrial scale, and he went to the task with enthusiasm. The pottery employed about sixty people and had large orders from the rubber industry and the army. However, it did not meet its production targets and was unprofitable. There was an apprentice rebellion and a huge kiln failure. Cardew admits that his enthusiasm developed into fanaticism. In 1945 Meyerowitz committed suicide. All these disasters led to the closure of Alajo.

In 1945 Cardew moved to Vume on the River Volta where he set up a pottery with his own resources. He chose to remain in Africa partly to erase the failure of Alajo and partly to vindicate the ideas of Meyerowitz, to whom he felt he owed a debt. He records in his autobiography his obsession to prove to the colonial administrators "that they were wrong to close down Alajo, and that a small pottery in a village would be successful in every way, provided it was allowed to develop naturally." He struggled with difficult clay and kiln failures for three years and later judged the Vumë pottery to have been unsuccessful, but its products are among his most highly regarded pots.

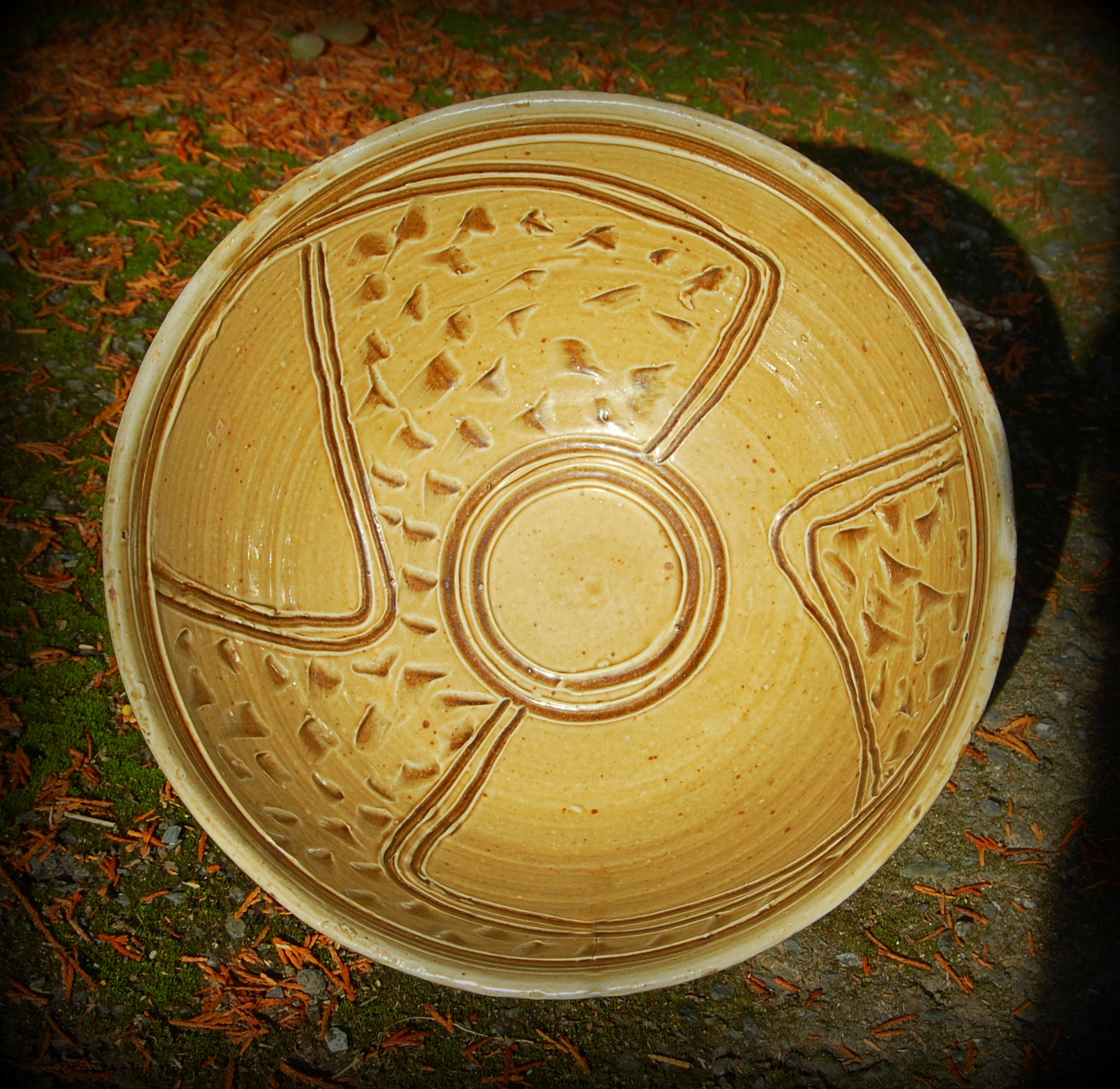
Michael Cardew Bowl made at Wenford Bridge

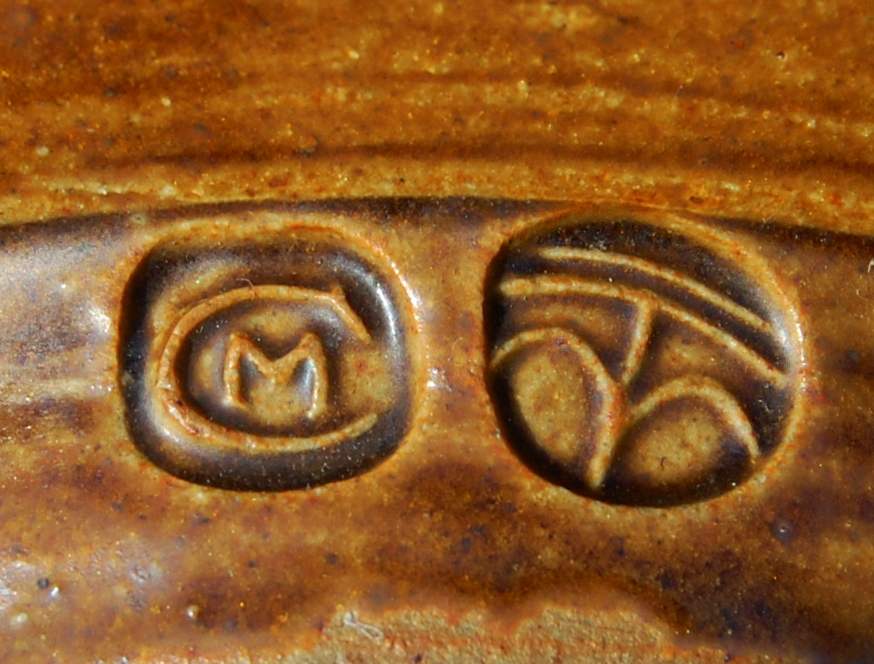
Cardew's mark

He returned to England in 1948 and made stoneware pottery at Wenford Bridge.

In 1951 he was appointed by the Nigerian government to the post of Pottery Officer in the Department of Commerce and Industry, during which time he built and developed a successful pottery training centre at Suleja (then called "Abuja") in Northern Nigeria. His first western student was Peter Stichbury. Another of his western students at Abuja was Peter Dick in 1961-62. His trainees were mainly Hausa and Gwari men, but he spotted the pots of Ladi Kwali and in 1954 she became the first woman potter at the Training Centre, soon followed by other women. As a result of Cardew's extensive contact with and admiration of African pottery, his later work shows its influence. He returned to Wenford Bridge on his retirement in 1965.

== Later life ==
Through Cardew's contact with Ivan McMeekin, in 1968 he was invited by the University of New South Wales to spend six months in the Northern Territory of Australia introducing pottery to indigenous Australians. He travelled in America, Canada, Australia and New Zealand, making pots, demonstrating, writing and teaching.

Cardew wrote an autobiography, A Pioneer Potter, and Pioneer Pottery, an account of pottery-making based on his experiences in Africa, which assumes that the potter will have to find and prepare his own materials and make all his tools and equipment.

Several of Cardew's former apprentices went on to become studio potters including Svend Bayer, Clive Bowen, Michael OBrien, and Danlami Aliyu.

Cardew died in Truro.

== Assessment and reputation ==
Bernard Leach said that Cardew was his best pupil. He has been described as "one of the finest potters of the century and one of the greatest slipware potters of all times." The decorative style of his slipware is usually trailed or scratched and is free and original. The stoneware he made at Vumë and Abuja is similarly well regarded. There are collections of his work in museums in Britain, (for example in the York Art Gallery), the United States, Australia and New Zealand.

== Honours ==
Cardew was one of the first bards of Gorsedh Kernow in 1928 with the bardic name Myghal An Pry ('Michael of the clay'). He was a Cornish speaker and contributed stories to the Cornish magazine 'Kernow' in the mid 1930s.

He was appointed MBE in 1964 and CBE in the 1981 Birthday Honours.
