= Sue Miles =

Anglo-American activist

Sue Miles (born Susan Crane, 20 March 1944 – 8 October 2010) was an Anglo-American counter-culture activist and restaurateur. With her husband Barry and the support of celebrities such as Paul McCartney, she started the Indica Gallery and the underground newspaper International Times (IT). She started her cooking career by running the cafe at the Arts Lab and then worked at other prominent restaurants in central London such as Food for Thought and L'Escargot.
