= George Kitchin =

English academic administrator (1827–1912)

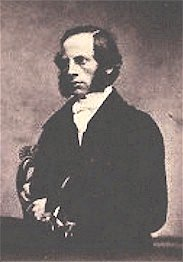
- Portrait of Kitchin by Lewis Carroll, 1859

Warden of the University of Durham
- In office 1894–1908
- Preceded by: William Lake
- Succeeded by: Frank Jevons

Chancellor of the University of Durham
- In office 1908–1912
- Preceded by: Position established
- Succeeded by: Henry Percy, 7th Duke of Northumberland

Dean of Durham
- In office 1894–1912
- Preceded by: William Lake
- Succeeded by: Hensley Henson

Personal details
- Born: George William Kitchin; 7 December 1827 Naughton, Suffolk, England
- Died: 13 October 1912 (aged 84) Durham, County Durham, England
- Spouse: Alice Maud Taylor (m. 1863)
- Children: 2, including Alexandra
- Education: King's College London; Christ Church, Oxford
- Profession: Dean; academic; warden

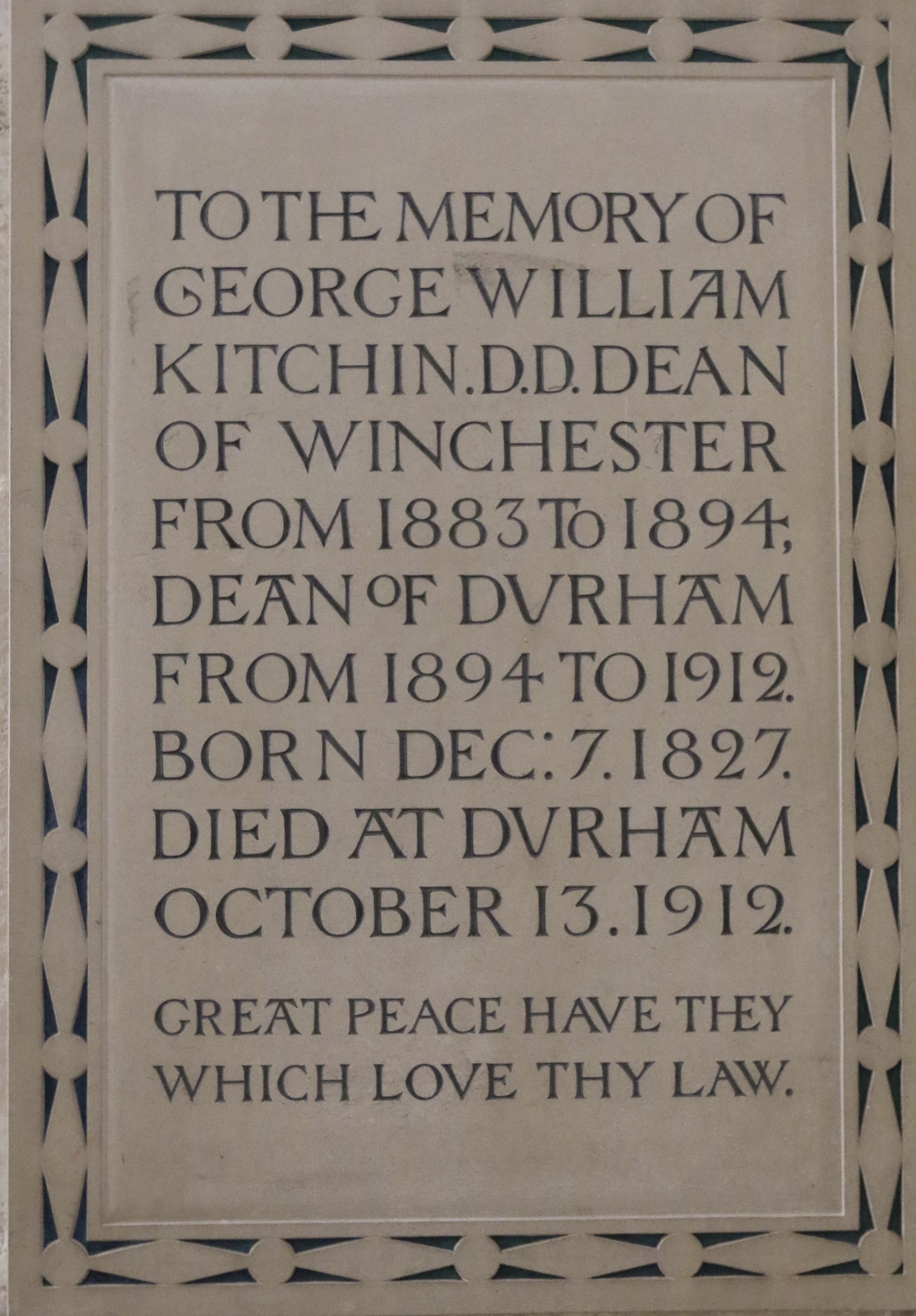
Memorial in Winchester Cathedral

George William Kitchin (7 December 1827 – 13 October 1912) was the first Chancellor of the University of Durham, from the institution of the role in 1908 until his death in 1912. He was also the last Dean of Durham to govern the university.

== Early life ==
Kitchin was the son of the Reverend Isaac Kitchin, then curate of St Mary's Naughton, Suffolk, and later Rector of St. Stephen's, Ipswich. He was educated at King's College School and King's College, London, then at Christ Church, Oxford, where in 1850 he took a Double First in Classics and Mathematics, promoted by seniority to MA (Oxon) in 1852.

== Career ==
In 1854, Kitchin was an examiner in Mathematics at Christ Church. He soon left Oxford to become Headmaster of Twyford Preparatory School in Hampshire in 1855. He returned to residence at Oxford as Censor in 1861. While at Christ Church, in late 1861 he was partly responsible for the ending of the Latin Prayer Service, conducted there since time immemorial, and for the continuation of which special provision had been made in the Act of Uniformity 1662. Kitchin served as Oxford's first Junior Censor of non-collegiate students from 1868 to 1883. He was also Select Preacher at Oxford for 1863–1864 and Whitehall Preacher for 1866–1867. He took a break from Oxford life to live at Brantwood, in the Lake District, from 1869 to 1871, a property later bought by his friend John Ruskin. While there he undertook assignments for the Clarendon Press, including working on the proofs of Richard Cleasby and Gudbrand Vigfusson's Icelandic-English Dictionary.

He was appointed as Chaplain to William Jacobson, Bishop of Chester, from 1871 to 1872, was tutor of Frederik, Crown Prince of Denmark (later Frederik VIII of Denmark), and was lecturer and tutor in history at Christ Church from 1870 to 1883. He was also Commissary to Charles Sandford, Bishop of Gibraltar, from 1874 to 1904, and was an Honorary Fellow of King's College, London, and an honorary Student (meaning Fellow) of Christ Church. In theology he was a moderate liberal.

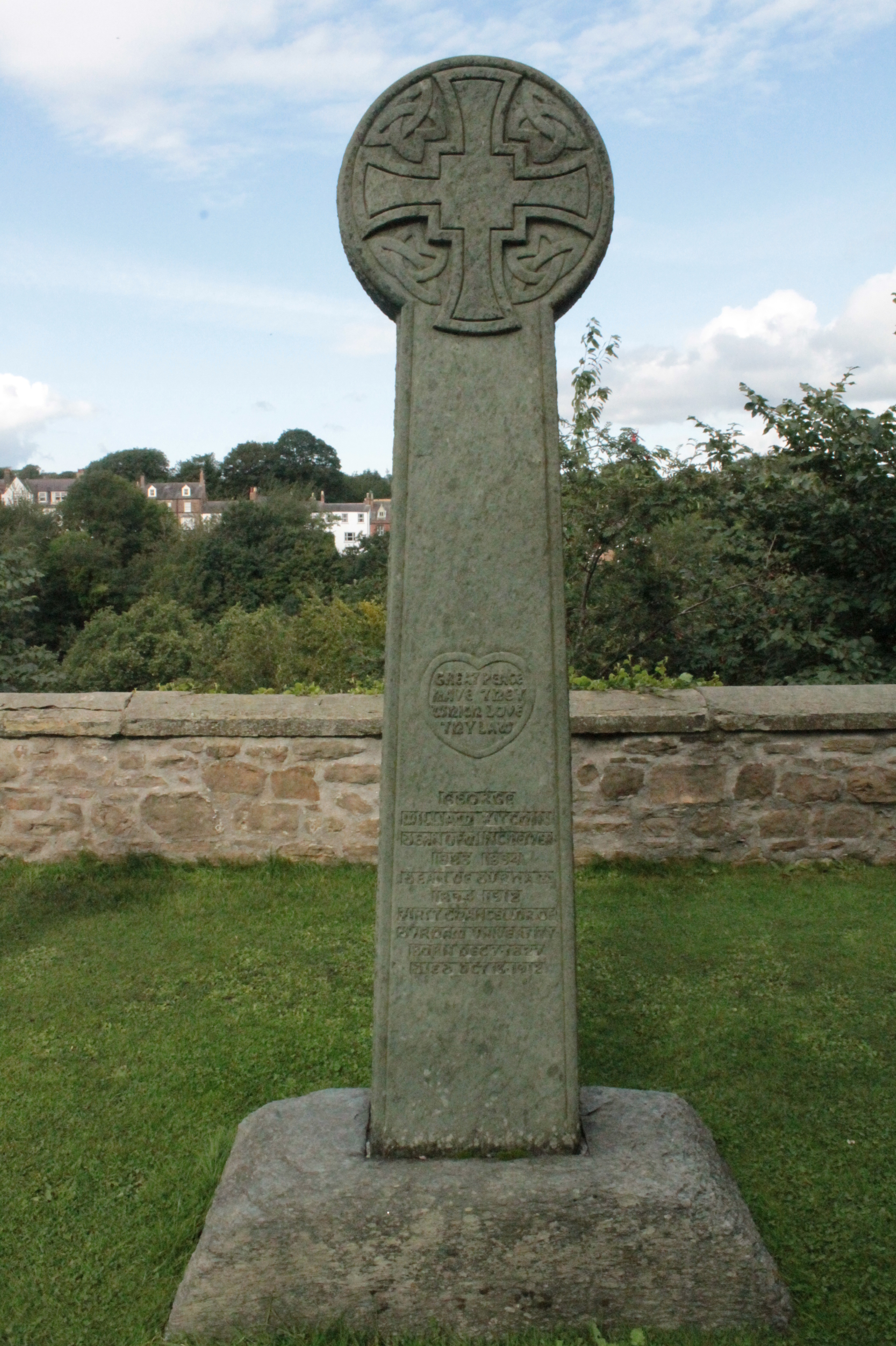
The grave of George Kitchin, Durham Cathedral churchyard

In 1879, Kitchin was a member of a committee formed to create a women's college at Oxford "in which no distinction will be made between students on the ground of their belonging to different religious denominations." This resulted in the founding of Somerville Hall, later renamed Somerville College.

In 1883, Kitchin was appointed as Dean of Winchester and in 1894 as Dean of Durham. At Oxford, his friends included John Ruskin and Lewis Carroll.

While Dean of Winchester Kitchin was responsible for refurbishments within the Cathedral, most notably the restoration of the mediaeval reredos behind the High Altar, usually known as 'The Great Screen'. The restoration was initially entrusted to the architect J D Sedding. However, Sedding's design for the scheme did not meet with general satisfaction and was not implemented. Thereafter, Kitchin personally took over and master-minded the entire project, essentially as his own architect, commissioning the many new statues needed to populate the restored screen. When completed, this was acclaimed as one of the Church of England's major artistic ecclesiastical restorations of the 19th century.

Kitchen joined the University of Durham in 1894 and admitted the first female students to the university.

In 1910, when the University of Durham was given a new constitution, Kitchin was elected as its first Chancellor and remained in office until his death two years later.

He died on 13 October 1912. He is buried on the west (right hand side) of the entrance path to Durham Cathedral next to Bishop Alfred Tucker.

== Personal life ==
On 8 September 1863, at Westminster Abbey, Kitchin married Alice Maud Taylor, second daughter of Bridges Taylor, the British consul in Denmark. Their daughter Alexandra, known as "Xie", born in 1864, became Lewis Carroll's favourite photographic subject. Their son George Herbert Kitchin (1865–1951), was a prolific architect, especially in Hampshire. Examples of his work include Compton End, Winchester, Lyegrove House, Sodbury, and Horsley Hall, Gresford. He was also a botanist and garden architect. They had three further children, two sons, Hugh Bridges and Brook Taylor, and a second daughter, Dorothy Maud Mary.

The studio potter Michael Cardew was his grandson; Seth Cardew and Cornelius Cardew were his grand-grandsons.

== Works ==
- Bacon's Novum Organum (2 vols., Oxford, 1855)
- Bacon's Advancement of Learning (London, 1860)
- Catalogue of Manuscripts in the Library of Christ Church, Oxford (Oxford, 1867)
- Catalogus codicum MSS. qui in bibliotheca Aedis Christi, Oxford 1867.
- A History of France (3 vols., 1873–77)
- "France - History” (article), Encyclopaedia Britannica, 9th and 10th editions, 1875–89 and 1902-03.
- "The Inquisition" (article), Encyclopaedia Britannica, 9th and 10th editions, 1875–89 and 1902-03.
- Ranke's Englische Geschichte, translated by Kitchin (1875)
- An Etymological Dictionary of the French Language (Crowned by the French Academy) by A. Brachet, author of 'A Historical Grammar of the French Tongue' Formerly Examiner and Professor at the Polytechnic School, Paris Laureate of the Institute, etc. Translated by G.W. Kitchin, M.A. (Clarendon Press, Oxford, 1878)
- Life of Pope Pius II (1881)
- Winchester Cathedral Records (2 vols., Winchester, 1886)
- Documents Relating to the Foundation of the Chapter of Winchester, A.D. 1541–1547 (London, 1889)
- Winchester (1890)
- Rolls of the Obedientaries of St. Swithin's Priory, A.D. 1309–1534 (Winchester, 1895)
- The Manor of Manydown, Hampshire (1895) works
- Edward Harold Browne, Bishop of Winchester: A Memoir (London, 1895)
- Ruskin in Oxford, and other Studies (1904).
- Sir Roger L'Estrange: A Contribution to the History of the Press in the Seventeenth Century

Kitchin also wrote the hymn 'Lift High the Cross' in 1887 for a special service in Winchester Cathedral.

Kitchin described several biblical manuscripts: Uncial 0132, Minuscule 506, Minuscule 507, and Minuscule 639.

Academic offices
Preceded by William Lake	Warden & Vice-Chancellor of the University of Durham; 1894–1908	Succeeded by Frank Jevons
Preceded by New creation	Chancellor of the University of Durham; 1908–1912	Succeeded by Henry Percy, 7th Duke of Northumberland
