= Richard Nixon (parody) =

Parody account on social media

Justin Sherin
- Born: 1981 (age 44–45); New Jersey, U.S.
- Education: Fordham University (B.A.); Yale Drama School (M.F.A.)
- Occupations: Playwright; Director; Screenwriter
- Writing career
- Notable works: Parody of Richard Nixon on X (formerly Twitter) and Bluesky

Richard M. Nixon, also known by the username @dick_nixon, is a parody account on Twitter and Bluesky created by playwright Justin Sherin. The account recreates the mannerisms and speaking style of Richard Nixon, 37th president of the United States, commenting on the politics and events of the day.

The account is followed by numerous politicians and journalists on both social media networks, with many calling it an uncanny recreation of Nixon's political instincts and mannerisms.

== Background ==
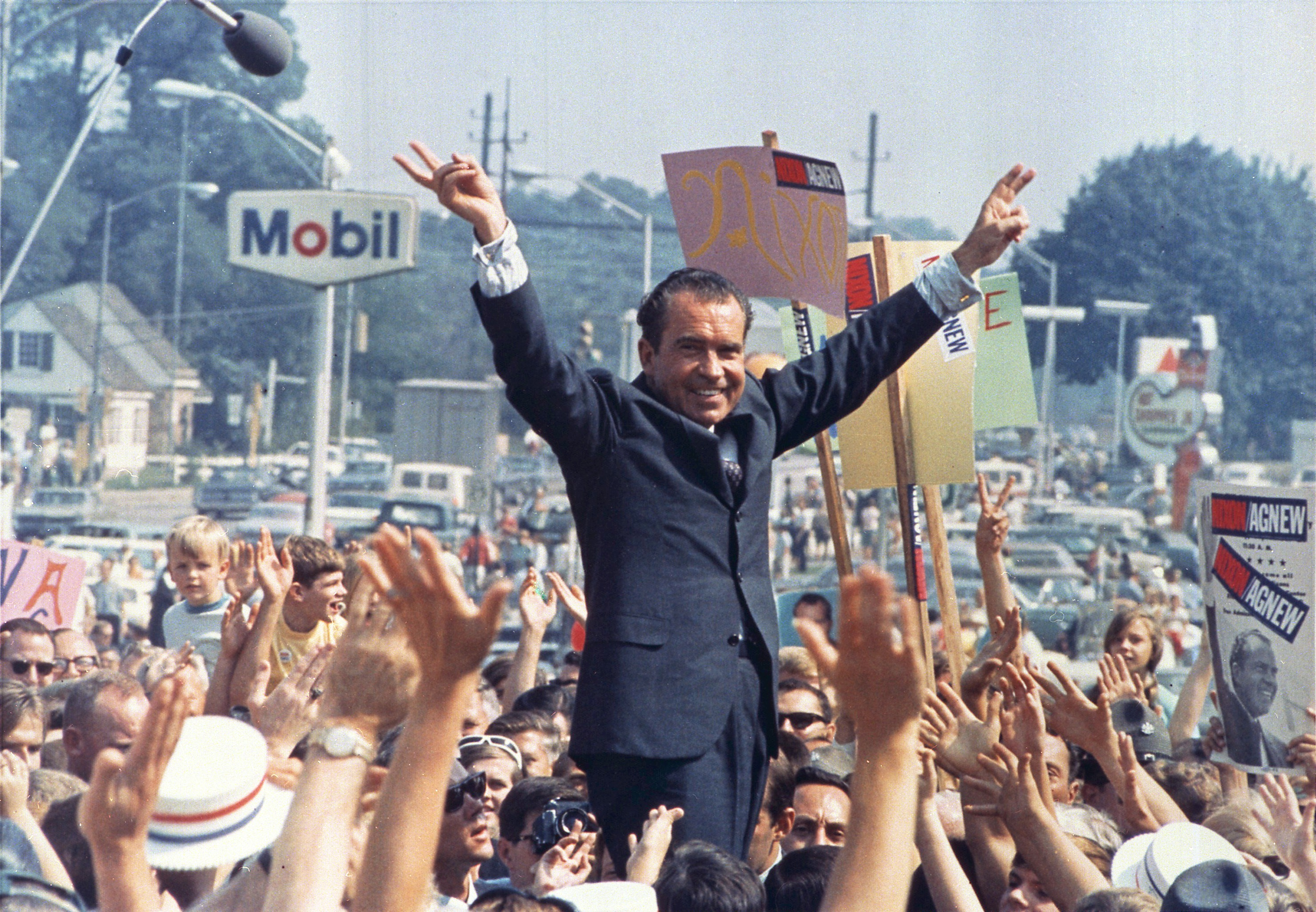
Nixon campaigning for president in Paoli, Pennsylvania, July 1968

The account was created by Sherin, a playwright from New Jersey, in 2008. He initially tweeted excerpts from the Nixon White House tapes. After abandoning the account for a few years, he returned to it in 2013, this time writing original tweets, using Nixon's old mannerisms, including using the phrase "My God", as the president did to convey shock or surprise.

According to Associated Press writer Hillel Italie, the account "... is neither tribute nor parody but an uncanny reincarnation that has some Washington insiders and political junkies marveling that someone could so well capture the phrasing, savvy, tenacity, profanity and world view of our 37th president." Sherin said he was fascinated by Nixon's "weird" and "convoluted" way of expressing himself: "I try very hard either to use something that he did say in a similar context or that I could argue he would have said when faced with such a situation."

According to Sherin, this version of Nixon is still alive and resides in Saddle River, New Jersey with his wife Pat, vacations in Key Biscayne, Florida and makes occasional trips to Washington, D.C. He also makes "press statements" – usually "President Nixon is resting" – through his former White House Press Secretary Ron Ziegler, signed "RZ", and comments on the main events of the day.

== Reception ==
Elizabeth Drew, a Watergate historian and journalist, commented that "[Sherin] has his voice and his mentality down cold. And he also makes me laugh." Journalist Robert Draper remarked on Sherin's recreation of Nixon: "I never got to meet Nixon, so this is the next best thing for me." Political consultant John Weaver said: "He seems to know everything there is about Nixon. He also has the president's keen political analytical skills, and he has that streak within Nixon that undid the president."

== See also ==
- Cultural depictions of Richard Nixon
