= Svend Bayer =

Danish-British studio potter

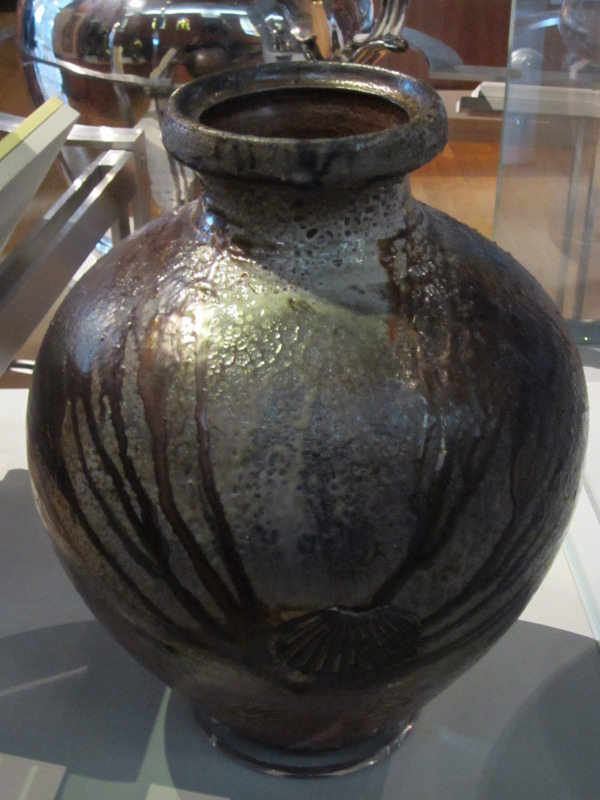
Vase made by Svend Bayer in 1997. Walker Art Gallery, Liverpool.

Svend Bayer (born 2 January 1946) in Uganda is a Danish-British studio potter described by Michael Cardew as "easily my best pupil."

Born in Uganda to Danish parents, Bayer grew up in Tanganyika and discovered pottery whilst studying geography and economics at the University of Exeter from 1965 to 1968. He began work as an apprentice at Wenford Bridge Pottery with Michael Cardew in 1969. In 1972 he joined the Brannam Pottery in Barnstaple, where he worked as a thrower for a year. He has been described as probably the best of the potters to work at Wenford Bridge, and his large pots have been said to be "very powerful".

After travelling in the Far East, Asia and the United States, he set up his own workshop in Sheepwash Beaworthy, Devon in 1975. He uses local North Devon ball clays and fires his kiln with wood. He is known for boldly decorated domestic ware and very large garden pots.

Bayer has exhibited widely in Europe, the Middle East, North America, Australia and New Zealand.
