= Fremington Pottery =

Fremington Pottery in North Devon, was founded by George Fishley in the early 1800s, the pottery was later taken over by George’s grandson, Edwin Beer Fishley (1832-1912). Studio potters Michael Cardew and Bernard Leach were influenced by their work and Leach called Edwin Beer Fishley “the last of the English peasant potters”.

The pottery was acquired by Brannam Pottery in 1915.

The pottery is best known for its slipware and sgraffito designs.

A number of pots are held in the V&A, a Fremington Pottery mottoware jug by Edwin Beer Fishley is a part of the Burton at Bideford pottery collection. The Museum of Barnstaple and North Devon has a large collection and a harvest jug, created for Mary Parminter in 1829 is on display at A La Ronde near Exmouth, Devon.
