= Cultural depictions of Richard Nixon =

Richard Nixon, the 37th President of the United States, has inspired or been portrayed in numerous cultural works.

== Literature ==
- What the Dead Men Say, a 1964 short story by Philip K. Dick predicting the election of Nixon in 1968
- Our Gang, a 1971 novel by Philip Roth
- The Public Burning, a 1977 novel by Robert Coover, and Whatever Happened to Gloomy Gus of the Chicago Bears?, a 1987 novella by the same author
- Watchmen, a 1986 alternate history comic book by Alan Moore and Dave Gibbons where Nixon is still President in 1985
- The Two Georges, a 1996 alternate history book by Richard Dreyfuss and Harry Turtledove, where Nixon is a used car salesman who never entered politics
- Transmetropolitan, a 1997–2004 series of comics, where one of US presidents 'The Beast' looks like Richard Nixon.

== Film ==
- 18½, a 2021 comedy thriller about the 18½-minute gap in the Nixon White House tapes, portrayed by Bruce Campbell
- The 101-Year-Old Man Who Skipped Out on the Bill and Disappeared, a 2016 Swedish comedy, portrayed by Darrell Duffy
- All the President's Men, a 1976 political thriller about the Watergate scandal
- Bebe's Kids, a 1994 American adult animated comedy film. A theme park animatronic Nixon serves as the prosecutor in a trial.
- Black Dynamite, a 2009 American blaxploitation action comedy film, portrayed by James McManus
- The Butler, a 2013 biopic about White House butler Eugene Allen, portrayed by John Cusack
- Dick, a 1999 comedy film that parodies the Watergate scandal, portrayed by Dan Hedaya
- Elvis & Nixon, a 2016 comedy-drama film that focuses on the December 21, 1970, meeting between the two men at the White House, portrayed by Kevin Spacey
- Elvis Meets Nixon, a Canadian mockumentary film, portrayed by Bob Gunton
- Forrest Gump, a 1994 film, portrayed by Joe Alaskey
- Frost/Nixon, 2008 film based on the eponymous play, portrayed by Frank Langella
- J. Edgar, a 2011 biopic about J. Edgar Hoover, portrayed by Christopher Shyer
- J. Edgar Hoover, a 1987 made-for-television film about Hoover, portrayed by Anthony Palmer
- Millhouse, a 1971 documentary
- Nixon, a 1995 biopic, portrayed by Anthony Hopkins
- Pawn Sacrifice, a 2014 biopic of Bobby Fischer, portrayed by Edward Yankie
- The Private Files of J. Edgar Hoover, a 1977 film
- Secret Honor, a 1984 film, portrayed by Philip Baker Hall
- Transformers: Dark of the Moon, portrayed by John Tobin
- Watchmen, a 2009 super-hero movie, portrayed by Robert Wisden
- The Werewolf of Washington, a 1973 satire of Nixon's presidency
- X-Men Days of Future Past, a 2014 super-hero movie, portrayed by Mark Camacho
- Born Again, a 1978 movie, based on Charles Colson's book, portrayed by Harry Spillman
- Million Dollar Duck, a 1971 Disney comedy, and uncredited Nixon impersonator has one line.

== Television ==
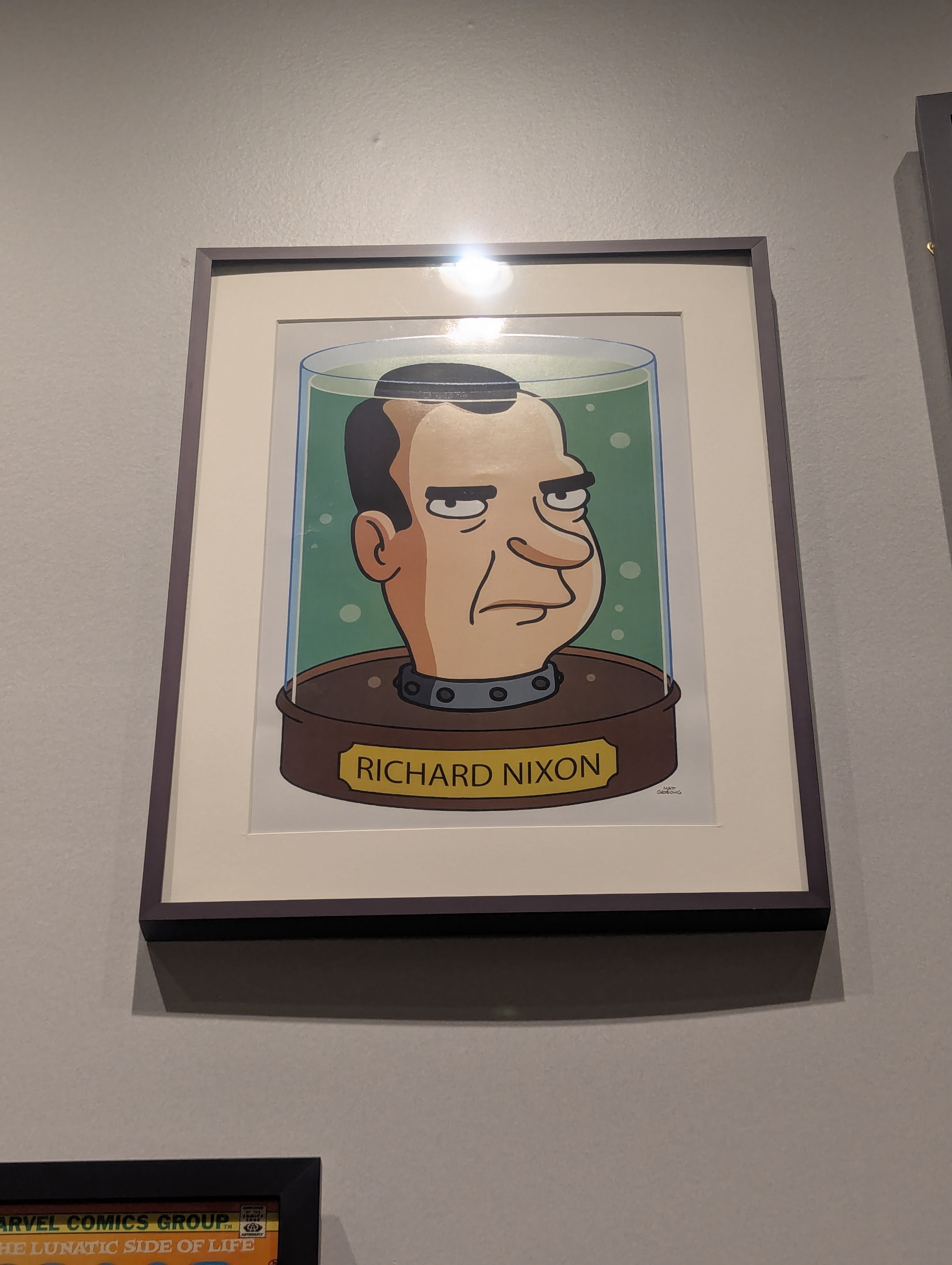
An illustration of Nixon, "President of Earth", from the television series Futurama on display at the Richard Nixon Presidential Library and Museum

- Futurama featured a fictionalized version of Nixon as a recurring character, President of Earth. A headless Spiro Agnew is his vice president, Portrayed by Billy West.
- In 1979, Nixon was portrayed by Rip Torn in the miniseries Blind Ambition.
- Nixon, as portrayed by Stuart Milligan, appeared in the Doctor Who sixth series episodes "The Impossible Astronaut" and "Day of the Moon".
- Nixon appears in the season 1 episode "The Watergate Tape" of the NBC series Timeless, where he is portrayed by Sheldon Landry. In the episode, Lucy, Wyatt, and Rufus travel to June 7, 1972, to stop Flynn from using the Nixon tape with the 18 1/2-minute gap and someone called the "Doc" to reveal Nixon's involvement with Rittenhouse.
- Nixon, as portrayed by Paul Ganus, appeared in the Legends of Tomorrow fourth series episode "The Getaway".
- Nixon was portrayed by Lane Smith, in the television movie The Final Days based on a book by Bob Woodward and Carl Bernstein. The television movie was released in 1989 and nominated for four Primetime Emmy awards.
- Nixon makes a guest appearance in the 2018 television series Trust.
- Slow Burn, an Epix documentary
- White House Plumbers (miniseries), an HBOMax limited series.
- Agent Elvis features a fictionalized meeting between Nixon and Elvis Presley. Nixon is voiced by Gary Cole.
- Paul Wilson plays Nixon in the anthology series The First Lady.
- Nixon is portrayed by Danny Winn in the Starz limited series Gaslit.
- A digital deepfake version over a body double of Nixon appears in the cold opening of Duster's episode: "Ravishing Light and Glory" directed by Steph Green.

== Music and stage production ==
Hundreds of songs have been released about or referencing Richard Nixon, with a significant portion focused on the Watergate scandal. Many songs also focus on the Vietnam War, as identified by the Vietnam War Song Project. Music historian Justin Brummer writes that in 1968 "Richard Nixon won the election and soon became the focus of protest". This included songs about the Moratorium to End the War in Vietnam, the Kent State shootings, the Pentagon Papers, and the Silent majority.

Stage productions include:

- Frost/Nixon, a 2006 play about The Nixon Interviews
- Nixon in China, a 1987 opera about Richard Nixon's 1972 visit to China

== Others ==
=== Twitter parody account ===
Since 2008, a popular parody account on Twitter, run by playwright Justin Sherin, has been imitating Nixon's mannerisms and commenting on politics and current events.

=== Video games ===
Richard Nixon is a playable character in the Call of Duty: Black Ops Zombies map "Five", which takes place in The Pentagon, alongside John F. Kennedy, Robert McNamara, and Fidel Castro. He is voiced by Dave Mallow.

A fictionalized version of Richard Nixon appears in the main campaign of Tropico 4 and it's 'Modern Times' expansion as the character 'Nicholas "Nick" Richards'.
