= Winchcombe Pottery =

English pottery company

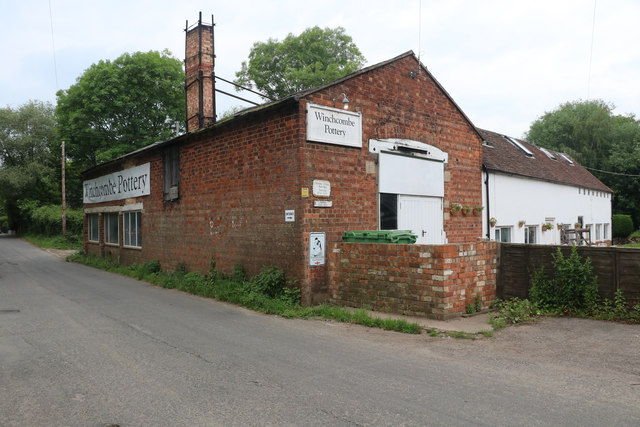
Winchcombe Pottery

Winchcombe Pottery, near Winchcombe in Tewkesbury Borough, North Gloucestershire, is an English craft pottery founded in 1926.

== Early history ==
A slipware cider flagon Michael Cardew made at the Winchcombe Pottery, c.1935.

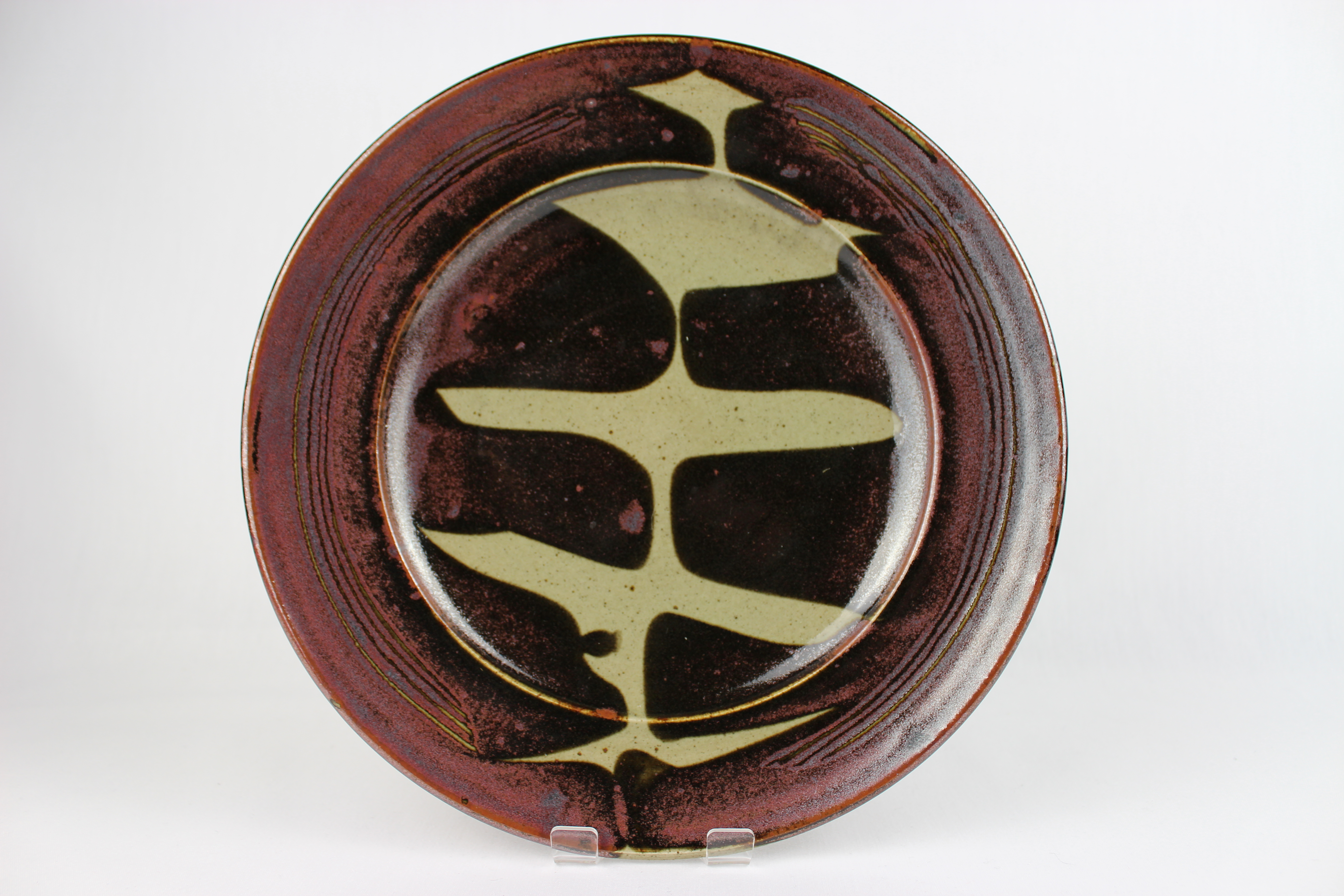
Plate by Ray Finch; from the W. A. Ismay Studio Ceramics Collection at York Art Gallery (YORYM-2004.1.2156)

There has been a pottery, with a bottle kiln, on the current site in Greet since at least 1800, 1 mile (1.6 km) north of Winchcombe. Known as Greet Potteries under the management of R. A. Beckett (who died in 1913), it produced a range of farmhouse ware, advertised as "Garden, Sea-Cale, Rhubarb, & Chimney Pots". Closed in 1914 at the outbreak of the First World War, it did not restart again after the war.

Bernard Leach is credited with restarting craftsman pottery in Britain in 1920. One of his early students was Michael Cardew who, at 25, was looking for a suitable site for his own pottery and in 1926 rented the old pottery buildings. Influencing his choice were the availability of local clay and the original bottle kiln. Cardew recruited two locals, critically Elijah Comfort, aged 63 and who had worked before in the pottery, and inspirationally, in 1927, Sidney Tustin (aged 13).

Cardew wanted people to use his pottery in regular daily use, as has been the tradition in early centuries. He followed the classic English slipware style using the red earthenware Winchcombe clay. After a difficult start and many trials, he managed to start slipware production. Experiments with firing the pots in the bottle kiln were eventually successful. For the produce of three men, the bottle kiln was really too large but it was what they had. A firing went on for three days. Gradually Cardew's skills and hard work were recognised. In 1935 he had one of his pots exhibited in the Victoria and Albert Museum. In 1935 the team was expanded to include Charlie, Sid's younger brother. A young chemist called Ray Finch tried to join the pottery staff in 1935 but was sent away by Cardew to gain some pottery experience. Finch returned in 1936, aged 22, and was able to convince Cardew that he now knew enough and he joined the team.

Cardew was a restless spirit and left to set up Wenfordbridge in Bodmin as his new pottery, leaving Finch to run Winchcombe Pottery. The Second World War caused the Tustin brothers to be called up and the bottle kiln was now too large. A small kiln was constructed in 1940. In 1943, Finch was called up and the pottery closed.

== Post-war years ==
In 1946 Finch bought the business from Cardew and restarted the pottery with the help of Sidney Tustin. The staff expanded and at last the bottle kiln saw proper usage. Students joined the pottery staff to learn the craft as they worked and many of them subsequently went on to be established potters in their own right. But the business was not as successful as hoped and in the early 1950s, the pottery was downsized. The last bottle-kiln firing took place in 1954.

Finch had always been inspired by the Japanese potter Shoji Hamada, and starting experiments with stoneware in 1952. A new stoneware kiln was built and slipware production continued using electric kilns until 1964 when all production switched to stoneware. In 1974 a wood-fired kiln was built to replace the oil-fired kiln for stoneware production and is still in use.

In the 1960s the pottery began to supply tableware to the Cranks chain of vegetarian restaurants.

Two of Ray Finch's sons followed their father's career: Mike Finch ran Winchcombe Pottery and Joe Finch runs his own pottery in Wales. Ray Finch, who continued work into his nineties, died on 18 January 2012.

The pottery continues to produce production wares with one offs and specials available in the shop. A small selection of slipware has been reintroduced to the shop. After Mike Finch took retirement in 2016, the pottery was run by Matt Grimmit until 2024; Matt is a relative of Elijah Comfort. Joe Finch now oversees the pottery.
