= Ray Finch (potter) =

English studio potter (1914–2012)

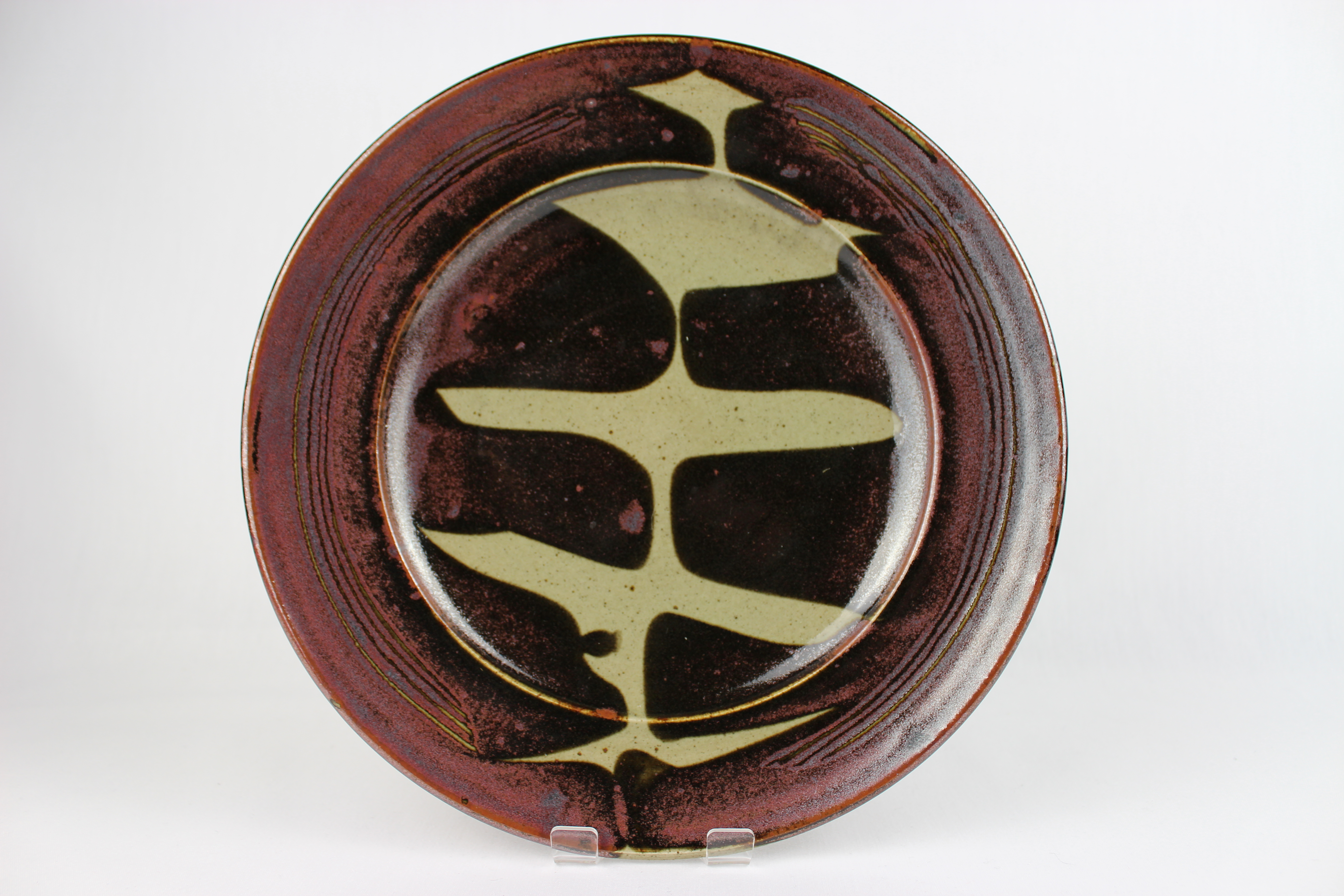
Thrown, poured-glaze plate (1972) by Ray Finch

Alfred Raymond Finch (27 November 1914 – 18 January 2012), was an English studio potter who worked at Winchcombe Pottery for a period spanning seventy-five years.

== Early life ==
Ray Finch was born in Streatham, South London.

== Career ==
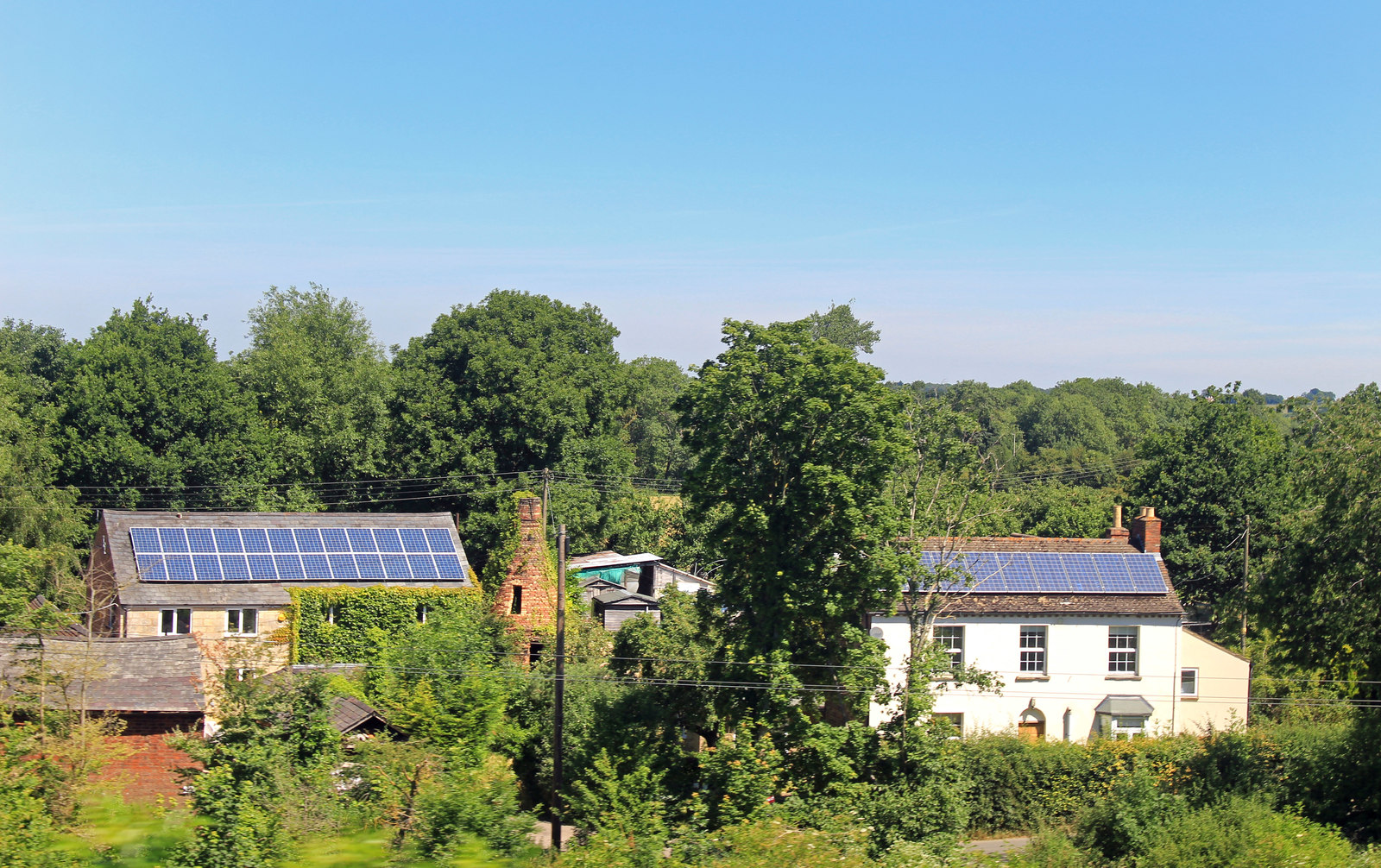
Winchcombe Pottery

In 1926 Michael Cardew had founded Greet Potteries at Winchcombe, Gloucestershire, where he made pottery in the English slipware tradition, functional and affordable, and fired in a traditional bottle kiln with help from Sidney Tustin. In 1935 Finch came to Gloucestershire and asked Cardew whether he could join the pottery. Cardew advised him to get basic skills first, and Finch went to the Central School of Art and Design, where he studied under Dora Billington and was recruited by Cardew in 1936. Finch purchased the pottery, now known as Winchcombe Pottery, in 1946.

Finch was interested in stoneware, and in 1952, he started experimenting with the more difficult clay. The experiments were eventually successful, and in 1954, the bottle kiln was fired for the last time, since it was too large and unsuitable for stoneware. Slipware production continued by using electric kilns, but was phased out in 1964. In 1974, the wood-fired kiln was built to replace the oil-fired kiln for stoneware production and has been used ever since.

Finch championed the workshop apprenticeship system and under his direction, many potters spent valuable time there including Colin Pearson, Jim Malone, John Leach (grandson of Bernard Leach) and Gwyn Hanssen Pigott.

Finch managed Winchcombe pottery until 1979 when his son, Michael took over the running of the business.

Finch was appointed MBE in the 1980 Birthday Honours and was given a Lifetime Achievement Award in 1999 at the International Ceramics Festival, Aberystwyth. Finch's work is represented in the V&A.

== See also ==
- Lucy Finch
