= Anne Merriman =

British doctor (1935–2025)

Anne Merriman MBE
- Born: 13 May 1935; Liverpool, England
- Died: 18 May 2025 (aged 90); Kampala, Uganda
- Education: National University of Ireland, UCD 1963
- Occupations: Doctor, philanthropist
- Organization(s): Hospice Africa Uganda, Hospice Africa UK
- Notable work: Founder of Hospice Home Care in Singapore and Hospice Africa. Presently Director of Policy and International Programs, Hospice Africa Uganda

Anne Merriman (13 May 1935 – 18 May 2025) was a British doctor, known for her pioneering work and influential research into palliative care in developing countries in Africa. She campaigned to make affordable oral morphine widely available.

In 1993, Merriman founded Hospice Africa Uganda. Under Anne Merriman's guidance, this introduced a model system of terminal care customized to developing countries with limited resources. From Hospice Africa Uganda (HAU) the Palliative Care Association of Uganda was founded and Anne was the founding Vice President. On a continent-wide basis, she was a founder member of the African Palliative Care Association.

== Life and career ==
Anne Merriman was born on 13 May 1935 in Liverpool, where she spent her childhood. She went to Ireland in 1953 and was enrolled in the UCD Medical School in 1957. After qualification in 1963, she completed an internship in the International Missionary Training Hospital in Medicine in Drogheda. Over the first decade of her post-graduate career, she completed three two-year stints in three Medical Missionaries of Mary hospitals in southeast Nigeria. This was interspersed with posts in Drogheda, Dublin and Edinburgh, during which she successfully took her MRCPI and MRCP Edinburgh as well as diplomas in child health and tropical medicine.

Since graduating as a medical doctor, Merriman spent 33 years working in Africa (including 10 in Nigeria as a missionary doctor and 20 in Uganda), seven in Southeast Asia, eight in the United Kingdom, and five in Ireland. She introduced palliative care into Singapore in 1985, which became an accepted form of care with the founding of the Hospice Care Association in 1989, while Senior Teaching Fellow in the Department of Community, Occupational and Family Medicine (COFM) in the National University of Singapore. This service is still fully functional in Southeast Asia. In 1990, Merriman returned to Africa, initially to Nairobi Hospice, before founding Hospice Africa. She introduced palliative care to Uganda in 1993, by forming an adaptable and affordable model, Hospice Africa Uganda (HAU).

=== Early life ===
Born in Liverpool into an Irish Catholic family, she went to Ireland when she was 18 to join the Medical Missionaries of Mary. She grew up in war-time Merseyside, seeking protection from bombs in Air-raid shelters. After the war ended, when Anne was 12, her brother Bernard (11) fell ill. Within a fortnight, he was dead from a brain tumour. The family was devastated. As Anne entered her teens, she began considering a career in medicine. During this time a local cinema screened a film about the Medical Missionaries of Mary and the work of its Irish head, Mother Mary Martin, in Africa. This was a large influence on Anne and at 18, she joined the order in Drogheda.

After graduation, Merriman was sent to work at St Luke's Hospital, Anua, in south-eastern Nigeria.

== Published works ==
- Audacity to Love: The Story of Hospice Africa: Bringing Hope and Peace for the Dying

Audacity to Love is the chronicle of Merriman's work in bringing to life her vision of making affordable pain relief to dying patients throughout the poorest countries of Africa. In this book, Merriman writes of those with whom she worked, as well as of patients, lessons learned and support received in setting up Hospice Africa.

== Later life and death ==
Merriman headed Hospice Africa's International Programs, supporting new initiatives in Tanzania, Nigeria, Cameroon, Sierra Leone, Malawi, Ethiopia, Zambia, Sudan and Rwanda, and more recently training initiators from 11 Francophone countries to suit their different health service and needs.

Merriman died in Kampala, Uganda on 18 May 2025, five days after her 90th birthday.

== Honours ==
- First award from International Association of Hospice and Palliative Care 2001, for initiating and promoting palliative care in Africa
- Honorary Fellowship from John Moore's University, Liverpool for contribution to relief of pain in the world
- MBE (Member of British Empire) Honor conferred in 2003 for contribution to health in Uganda.
- Honorary Doctorate of Science at UCD (NUI) for contribution to palliative care in Africa
- Honorary DSc from Edge Hill University, Merseyside, for contribution to palliative care in Africa
- UCD Alumnus of the Year in Health Sciences 2016

== Accomplishments ==
- Founder and Director of Policy and International Programs, Hospice Africa Uganda
- Honorary Teaching Fellow, International Observatory on End of Life Care in the Institute for Health Research, Lancaster University.
- Honorary Professor of Palliative Care at Makerere University in Kampala, Uganda
- Founder Member and the Founding Vice Chair of the Board of the Palliative Care Association of Uganda (formed in 1999)
- Founder Member and the Founding Vice Chair of the Board of the African Palliative Care Association (formed in 2003)
- Board Member of Hospice Africa UK and Hospice Africa
- Past Board Member of the International Association for Hospice and Palliative Care (IAHPC)
- Vice President for East Africa of the African Organizations for Research and Training in Cancer (AORTIC)
- Founder Cancer Disabilities Advocacy Centre (CADAC) founded in 2023

== Education ==
- MB BCh BAO: University College Dublin 1963
- DCH: Diploma in child health
- DTM&H: Diploma in Tropical Medicine and Hygiene
- MComm H: Master's in International Community Health
- FRCM (Nig): Fellow of the College of Medicine in Nigeria
- AM(Sing ): Member of the Academy of Medicine in Singapore
- FRCP (Edin) Fellow of the Royal College of Physicians in Edinburgh
- FRCP(Ire): Fellow of the Royal College of Physicians in Ireland
