= Sidney Tustin =

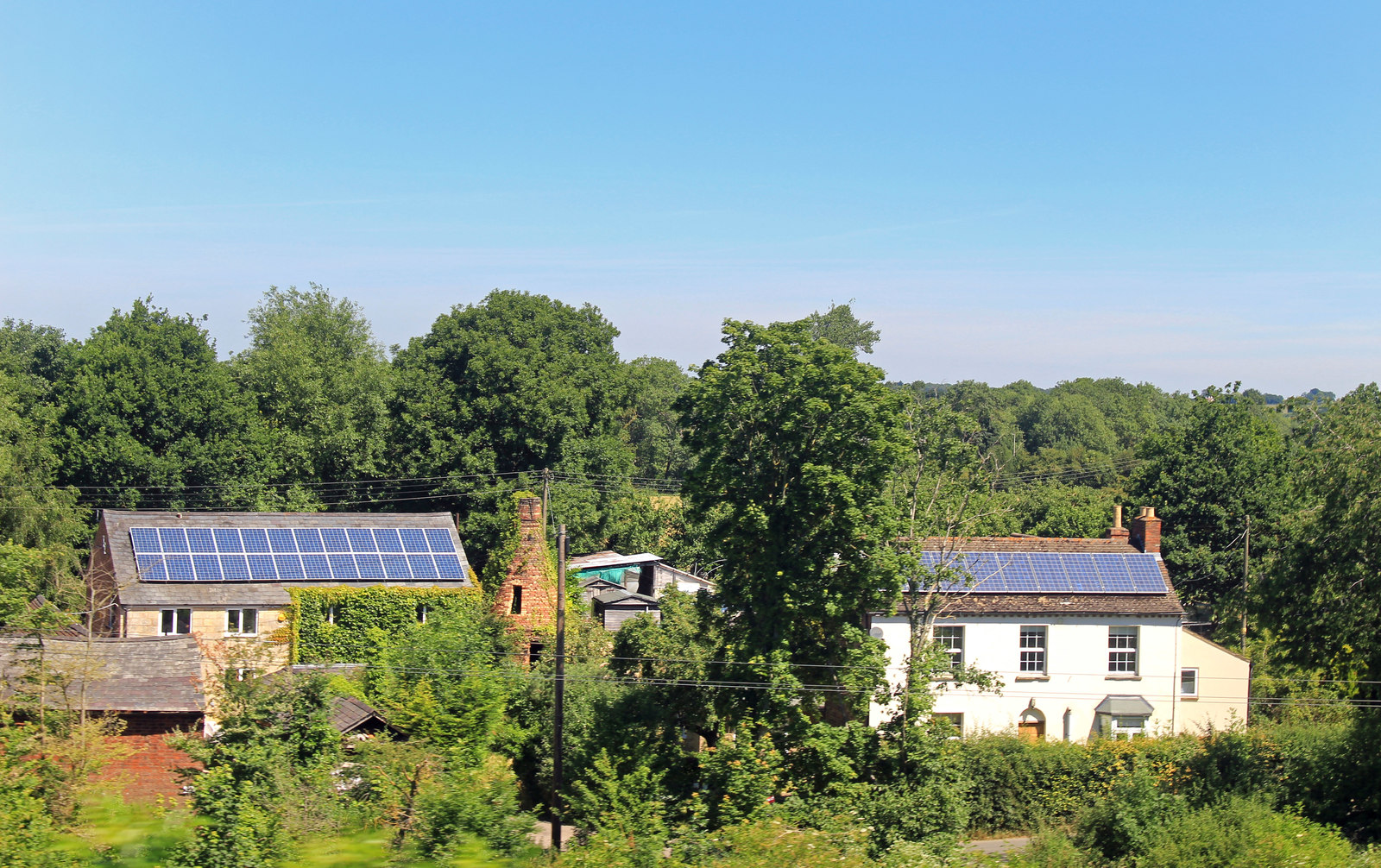
Winchcombe Pottery

Sidney Tustin (8 September 1913 – 9 November 2005) was a potter born in Winchcombe, Gloucestershire. Tustin began working aged 13, with Michael Cardew at Winchcombe Pottery in 1927. After a four-year apprenticeship he became a skilled thrower, specialising in smaller items of earthenware tableware and remaining there until his retirement in 1978. His brother Charlie Tustin joined the pottery as an apprentice in 1935. Tustin enlisted with the Dorset Regiment on the outbreak of the Second World War.

In 1939 Cardew left for Wenford Bridge, Cornwall, and Tustin, on his return from war service worked alongside Ray Finch, who purchased the pottery in 1946. It has been estimated that Tustin personally threw a million pots during his career at Winchcombe.

Muriel Rose a collector of modern craft and design, wrote of Tustin as Cardew's first pottery boy, ”His jugs in particular have a lightness and balance of form which distinguishes them”. from her book Artist Potters in England (1955).

Under Finch, Tustin changed from making earthenware to stoneware in the 1960s. Tustin's work is held in the ceramic collection of Aberystwyth University, a slip decorated bowl from 1953 is held in the collection of National Museum of Scotland and there is an earthenware jug with black slip-trailed decoration in the permanent collection of Aberdeen Art Gallery. A dish with a stylised resist motif of a dog is held in the Potteries Museum & Art Gallery Stoke on Trent.

Tustin married Marie Smith in 1935 they had one son and two daughters, he died at Winchcombe on 9 November 2005.
