= Christine Jones =

Christine Jones may refer to:

- Christine Jones (artist) (born 1955), Welsh artist
- Christine Jones (actress) (born 1943), American soap opera actress
- Christine Jones (scenic designer), Broadway scenic designer
- Christine M. Jones (1929–2013), member of the Maryland House of Delegates
- Christine Jones (businesswoman) (born 1968), American businesswoman and Arizona political candidate
- Christine Jones (police officer) (born 1964/1965), British police officer
- Christine Jones (bowls) (born 1963), New Zealand-born Norfolk Islander lawn bowls player
- Christine Jones (Home and Away), a fictional character on the Australian soap opera Home and Away

== See also ==
- Christine Jones Forman, American astrophysicist
