= Jane Hamlyn =

English studio potter (born 1940)

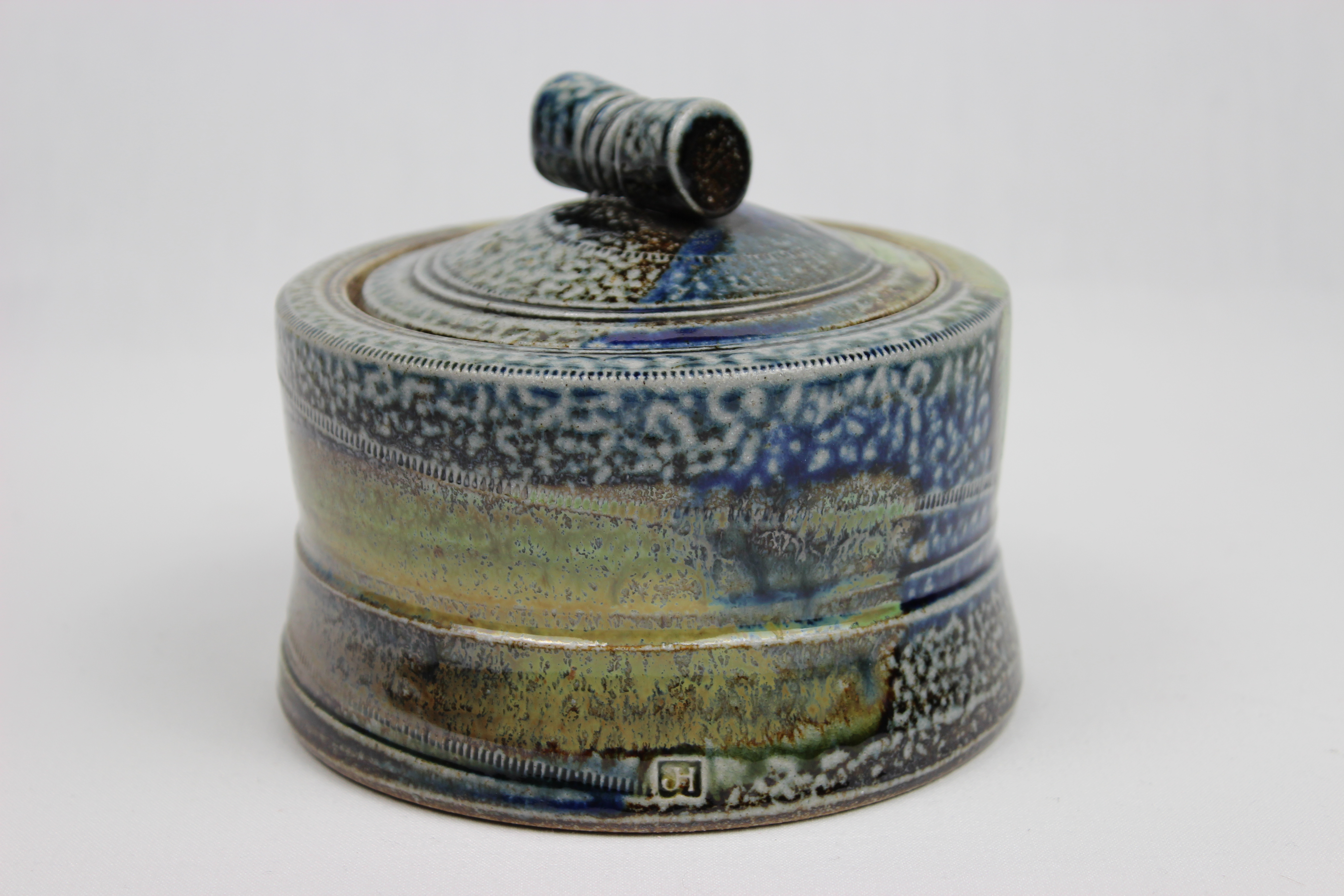
Thrown, Salt Glazed lidded box by Jane Hamlyn

Jane Hamlyn MBE (born 1940) is an English studio potter known for her functional salt glaze pottery.

Born in Whitechapel, London, Hamlyn initially trained as a nurse at University College Hospital London. She studied pottery part-time at Putney Adult Education Centre, before attending Harrow School of Art (1972–1974) where she was taught by Michael Casson. In 1975, she set up Millfield Pottery Workshop near Doncaster Yorkshire.

Hamlyn is credited with discovering the green colour that arises when painting a titanium wash over a blue slip and in 1999 she was awarded the European Saltglaze Prize. Along with Walter Keeler she is considered a pioneer of the salt glaze revival.

Hamlyn is a Fellow and former chair of the Craft Potters Association.

Her work is displayed at the Victoria & Albert Museum London, in the Crafts Council Permanent Collection, and the William Alfred Ismay ceramics collection at the York Art Gallery.

Hamlyn was appointed Member of the Order of the British Empire (MBE) in the 2022 Birthday Honours for services to pottery and ceramics.
