= Coxwold Pottery =

The Coxwold Pottery was a pottery studio based in the village of Coxwold, North Yorkshire, England, launched by artist potters Peter and Jill Dick in 1965, and in operation until 2012.

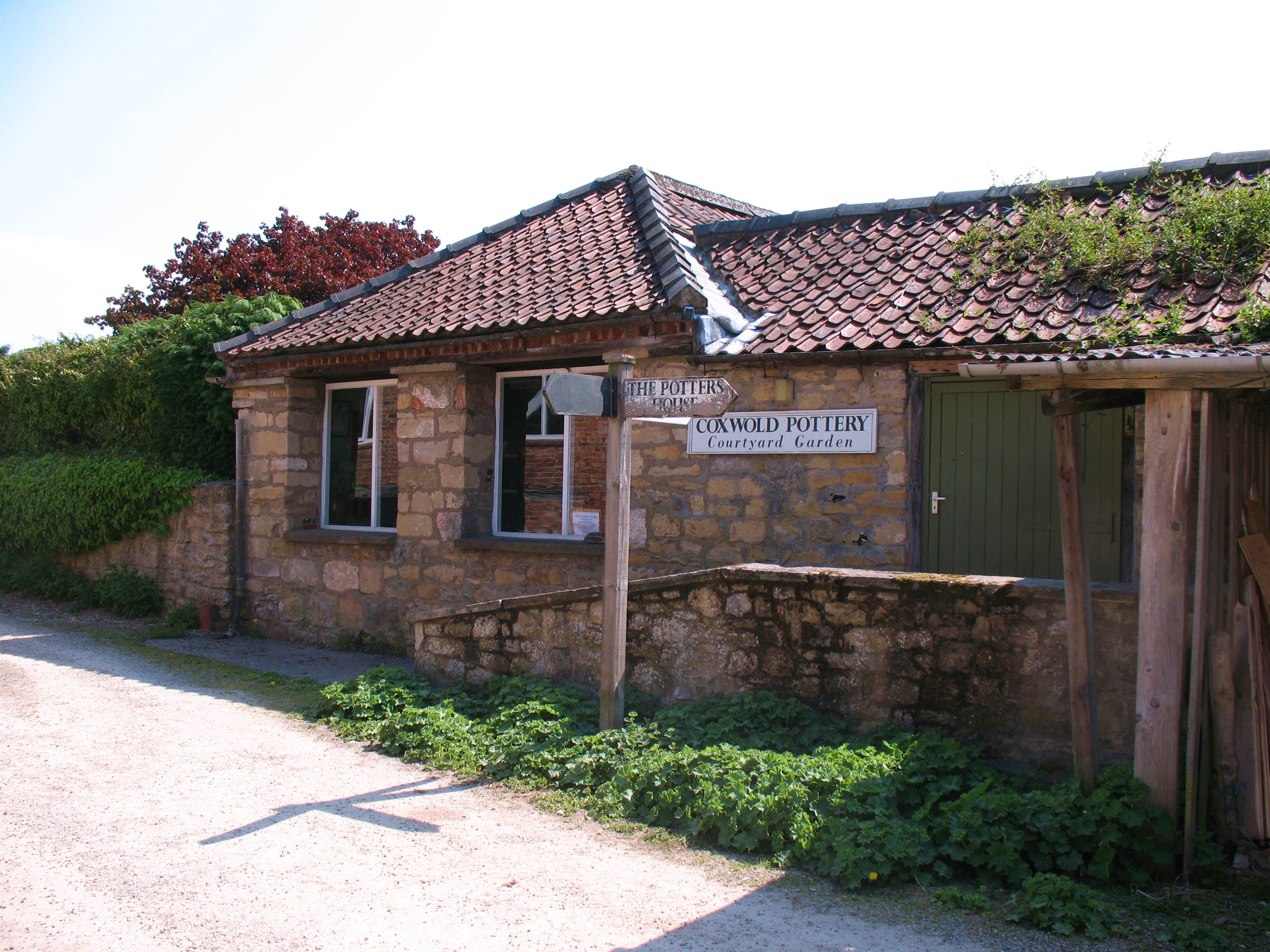
Coxwold Pottery Gallery in 2010

The pottery produced slipware decorated pottery, including kitchenware, tableware, planters and commemorative pieces, mostly thrown on the wheel. Their methods varied over the years from low-fired earthenware to high-fired, the techniques changing somewhat when they largely changed over to electric kiln firing in the early 1980s.

William Alfred Ismay described their work as " . . practical and useful, and the overall impression is of warmth and generosity - a real 'country pottery' feeling".

== The Potters ==
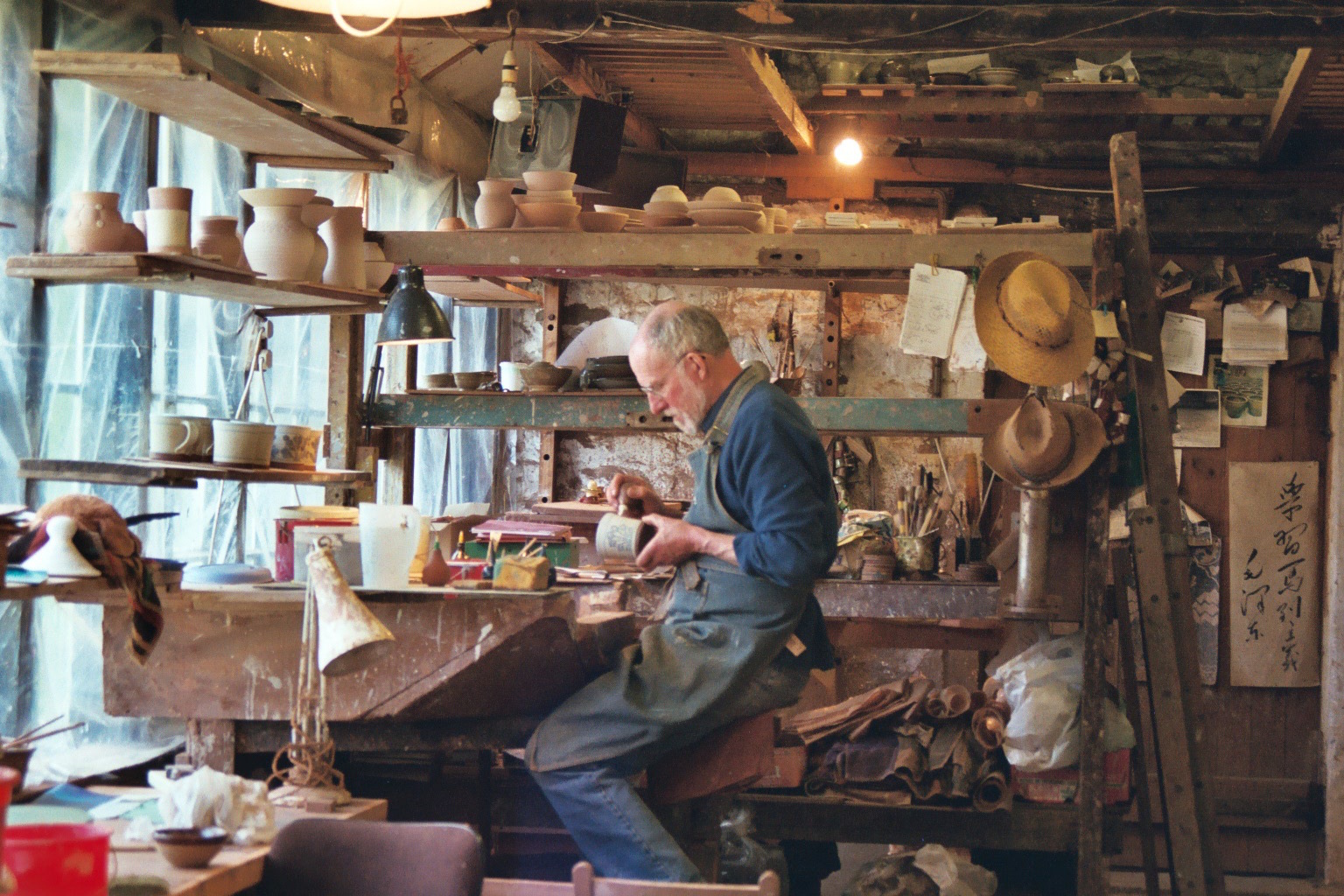
Peter Dick working in the pottery in 2003

Peter Dick worked with Michael Cardew in Nigeria then with Ray Finch at the Winchcombe Pottery in the Cotswolds. An article by Peter, reminiscing on his experiences in Abuja with other background information, appeared in 'Interpreting Ceramics', Issue 3. A valuable 'family tree' of potters shows his relationship to these potters. His distinctive style of potting and decoration was well-recognised and shown in many exhibitions, for example the Craft Council Domestic Pottery year-long touring exhibition round the UK. As well, a number of Museums and public collections have Peter Dick pots. For example, the City of York Art Gallery 'Centre for Ceramic Art' (CoCA) records having 46 pieces of pottery by Peter Dick, 23 of these from the W. A. Ismay collection. A speciality became the making of large commemorative plates, these were often commissioned by customers to celebrate family events.

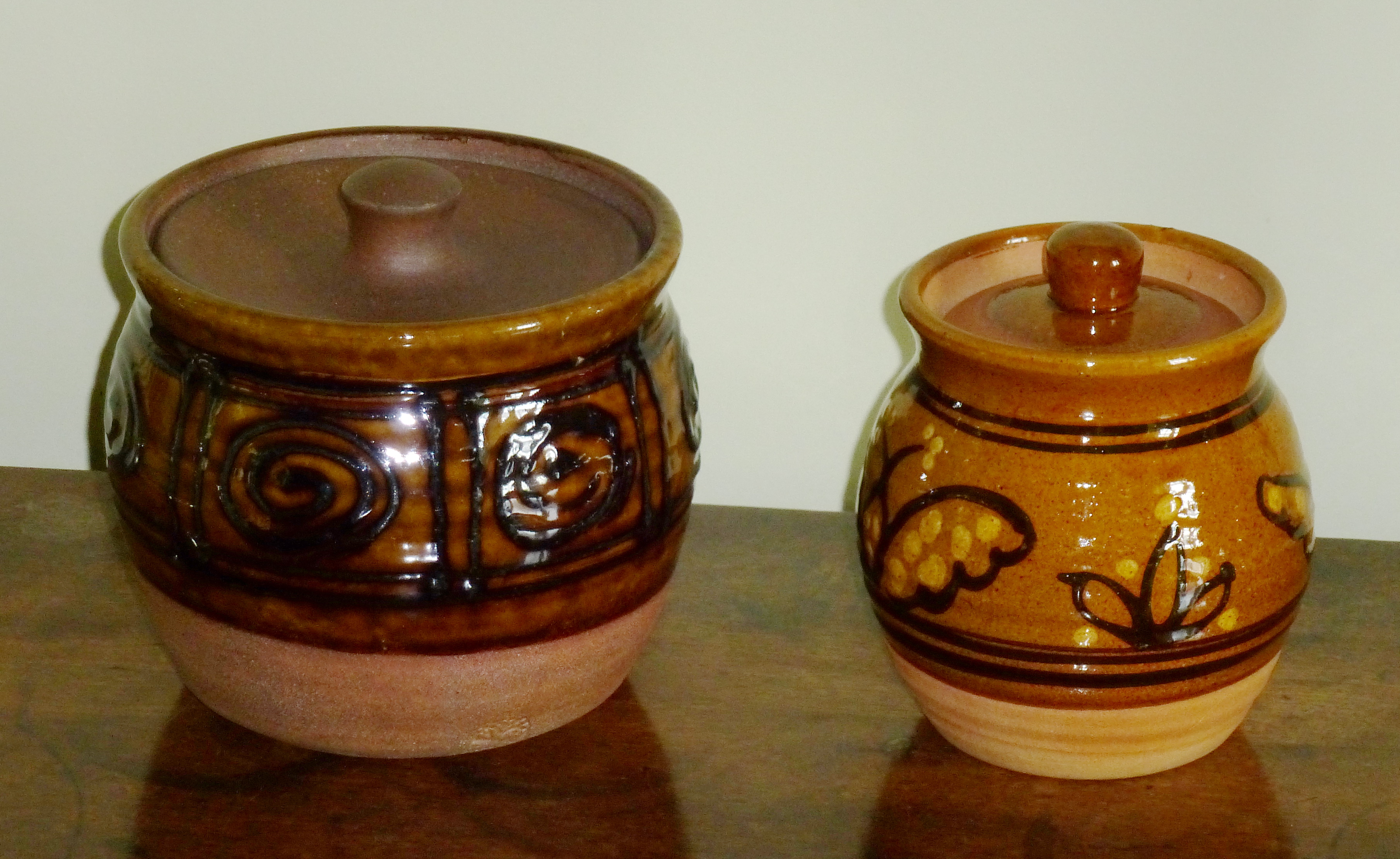
Two typical Coxwold Pottery pots by Peter Dick from the 1970s, showing colour of glazes and the 'speckled' effect produced by the wood firing.

As well as making pots, Dick participated in the studio pottery movement, being involved with the Crafts Council, the UK Craft Potters Association (board member for a period) and the Northern Potters Association (of which he was a founder member.)

Jill Frances Dick (née Smith) was an artist and noted potter in her own right. Having studied art at Gloucestershire College of Art, she established her own small pottery in Winchcombe. In the early years of the Coxwold Pottery, she actually produced more pottery than Peter, before family commitments reduced her activity. When she resumed her active potting, she developed an interest in raku ware. Her pottery was shown in various exhibitions and sold through outlets such as 'Contemporary Ceramics' and the 'Craftsmen Potters Shop and Gallery' in London. In recognition of her skills and standing she was made an Honorary Member of the Craft Potters Association.

== The Pottery ==
=== Coxwold' pottery ===
Their products are usually referred to as 'Coxwold pottery', not as 'Peter Dick' or 'Jill Dick' pots. It does not refer to the business. The Pottery was just off the Oulston Road in Coxwold, originally this was a dairy barn with an orchard. The Pottery closed in 2012, following the death of Peter Dick.

=== Wood firing techniques ===
Most of their pottery was produced in a wood-fired kiln, a method that Peter Dick had observed while working with his mentor, Michael Cardew, in Abuja Nigeria from 1961 to 1962. Though labour-intensive, needing an all-night firing, the ash from the kiln landing on the pottery gave the glaze a mottled effect to the largely brown to yellow glazes. The pottery especially in the early years was fired in a bourry fire box-style kiln, later a second chamber for stoneware was added.

=== Marks ===
The pottery marks used by Coxwold Pottery were mostly an impressed mark in the form of an apple tree, as a reference to the orchard on the property. This changed slightly from 1969. Peter and Jill had their own marks in the form of their initials.

=== Outlets and exhibitions ===
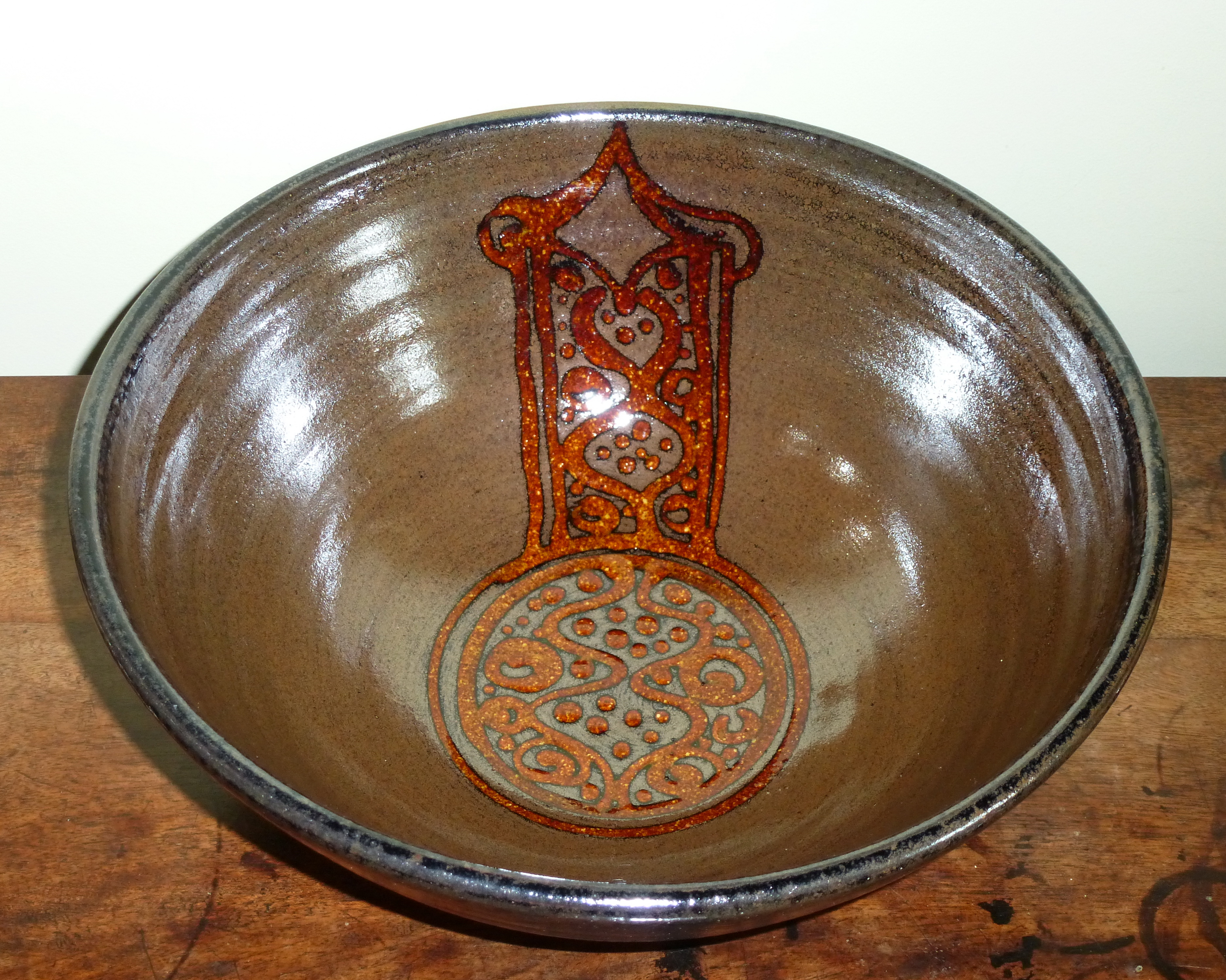
An example of Coxwold Pottery from the mid 1970s, following in 1973 a three month visit to Eastern Europe and Turkey (see Borthwick ref), which for a period inspired 'arabesque' themed decoration.

The pottery was sold through a number of outlets, including their own showroom in Coxwold, but also in London for a time through the Elizabeth David shop, Harrods, 'Alicat', and the 'Craftsmen Potter's Shop and Gallery' in Soho. Coxwold pottery also featured in exhibitions across the UK and abroad, for example the Craft Council Domestic Pottery year-long touring exhibition round the UK, which then toured in France. Another exhibition which included examples of Peter Dick's work was 'Michael Cardew and Pupils', held at York Art Gallery in 1983, this also toured in the UK. The catalogue contained an article by Peter Dick, also published in 'Ceramic Review'. Other exhibitions were 'York Potters', held at the Graves Art Gallery, London in 1978. W. A. Ismay, wrote a review of a major exhibition of some 300 pieces of their pottery, held at the Craftsman Potter's Shop, London, September to October 1977.
