= Ashraf Hanna =

Egyptian sculptor

Ashraf Hanna is a ceramic sculptor. He is from Minya, Egypt and now has a studio in Pembrokeshire, Wales. His work includes handbuilt forms based on a pinch pot such as Undulating Vessels which have been acquired by the Victoria & Albert and Fitzwilliam Museums. His works usually have a burnished finish created using a slip resist technique which he calls naked raku.

He has won several awards including Welsh Artist of the Year in 2010, in the Applied Arts category.

Hanna’s work in kiln-cast glass developed from his ceramic practice during his MA at the Royal College of Art. He creates his forms by sculpting solid clay, which is then used to make refractory moulds for kiln casting in glass. The process allows him to investigate how the aesthetic qualities of his ceramic vessels can be translated into a transparent material, while also exploring the optical and material properties of glass. His glass work received the First Prize (Best in Show) at the British Glass Biennale in 2015 for Blue Vessel Form, which was subsequently acquired by the Ernsting Stiftung Glasmuseum in Germany. In 2016, Amber Red Vessel Form received the Crossover Award at Emerge 2016, the international juried exhibition of kiln-glass organised by Bullseye Projects.

In 2024, Hanna was a guest judge on The Great Pottery Throw Down.
