= William Alfred Ismay =

British collector and librarian (1910–2001)

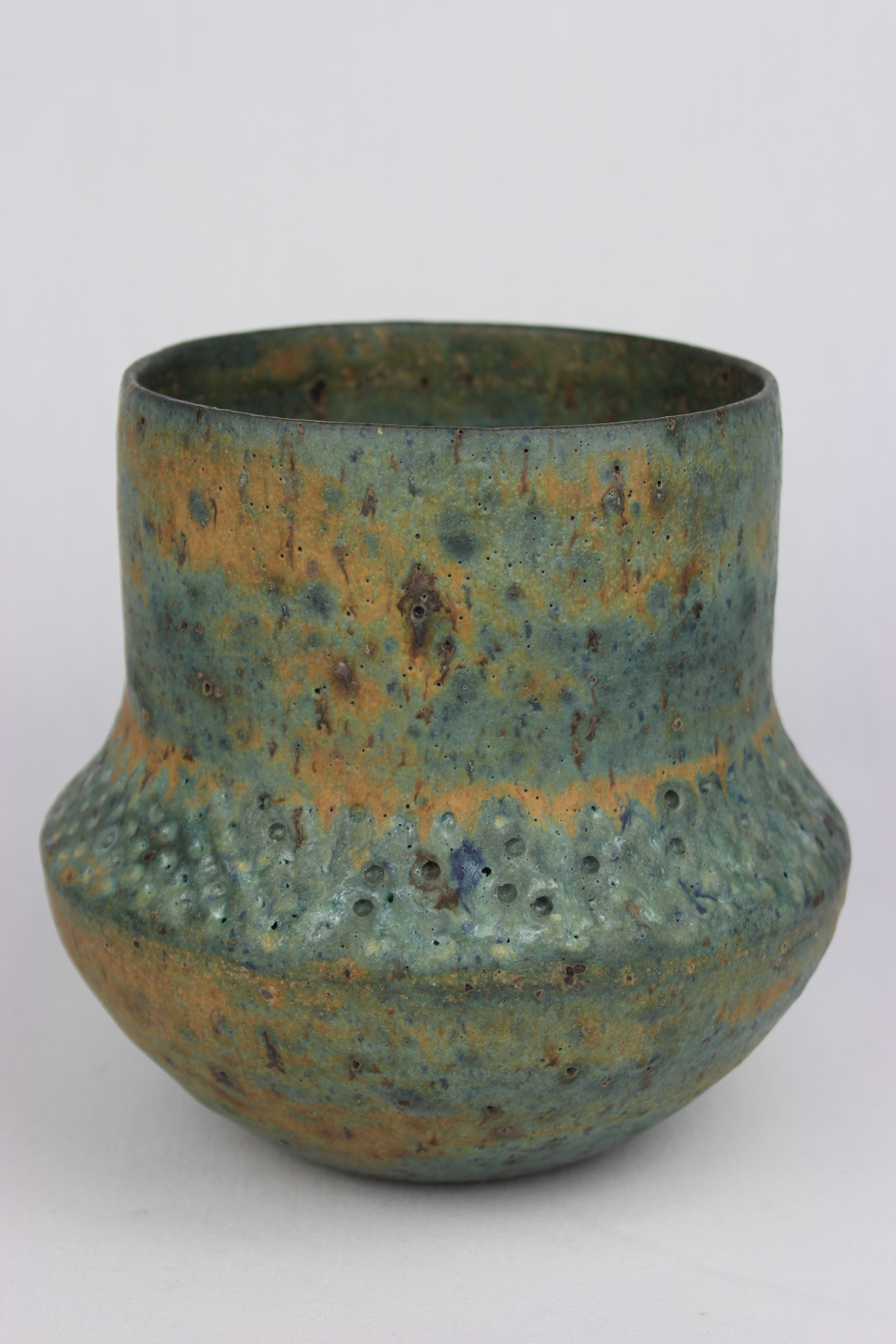
Thrown vase by Lucie Rie in the W.A. Ismay Collection

William Alfred Ismay MBE (10 April 1910 – 13 January 2001) was a librarian, writer and collector in Wakefield, West Yorkshire known for his significant collection of post-war studio pottery. The collection called the W.A. Ismay Collection was bequeathed to the Yorkshire Museum and is one of the world's largest collections of 20th-century studio pottery. It includes work by Bernard Leach, Hans Coper, Shoji Hamada, Takeshi Yasuda, David Leach Dan Arbeid and Lucie Rie.

== Life ==
Ismay was born in Wakefield, an only child; his father was a trouser presser and his mother a school teacher. He attended Wakefield Grammar School and studied classics at Leeds University. He was stationed in India during the Second World War as a signalman in the Royal Signals Corps

From 1955 Ismay collected 3,600 pots from 500 makers. By the time of his retirement in 1975 he was head librarian at Hemsworth Library. In 2014 a blue plaque was unveiled in his honour.

== Gallery ==
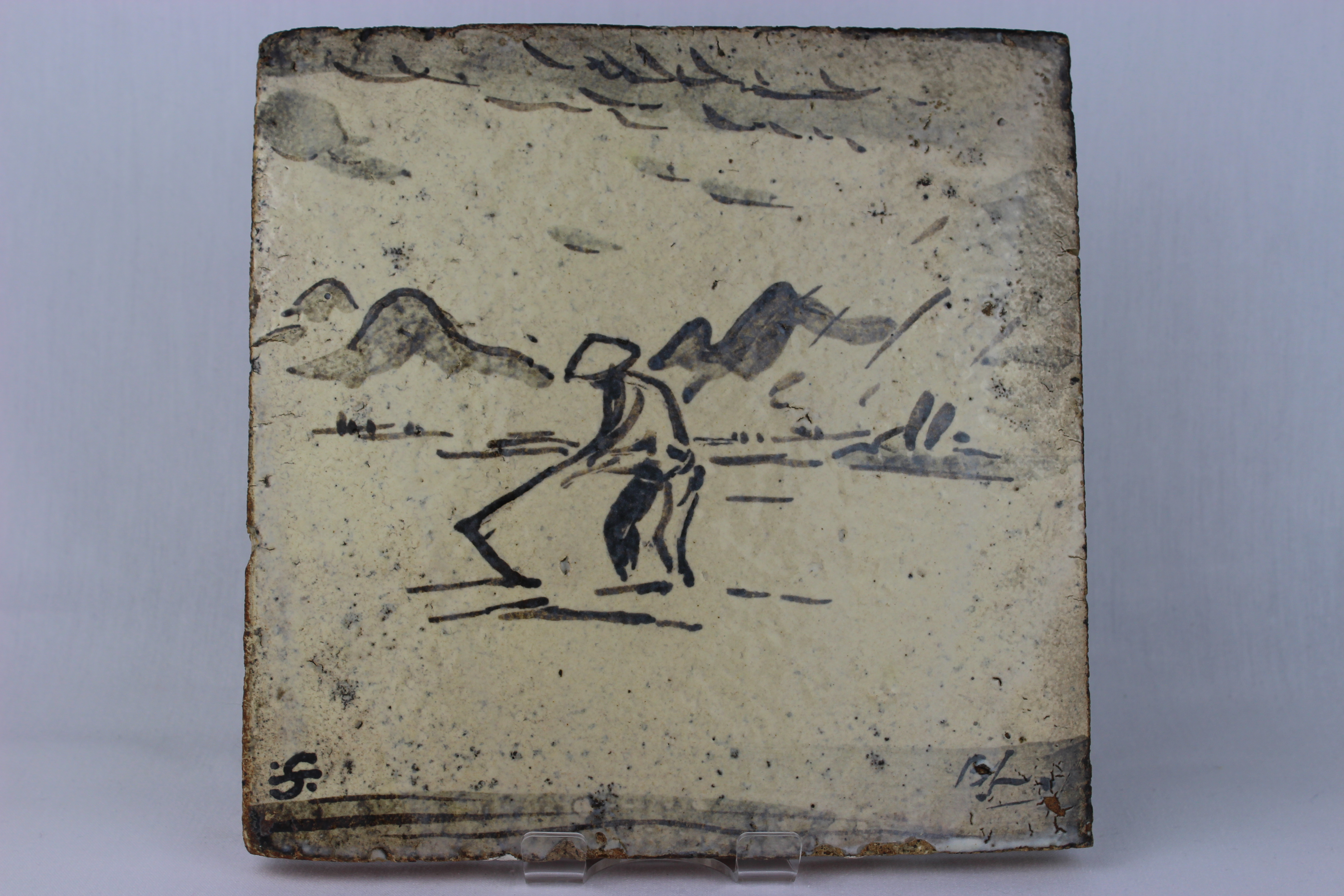
Hand-Built decorative tile by Bernard Leach.

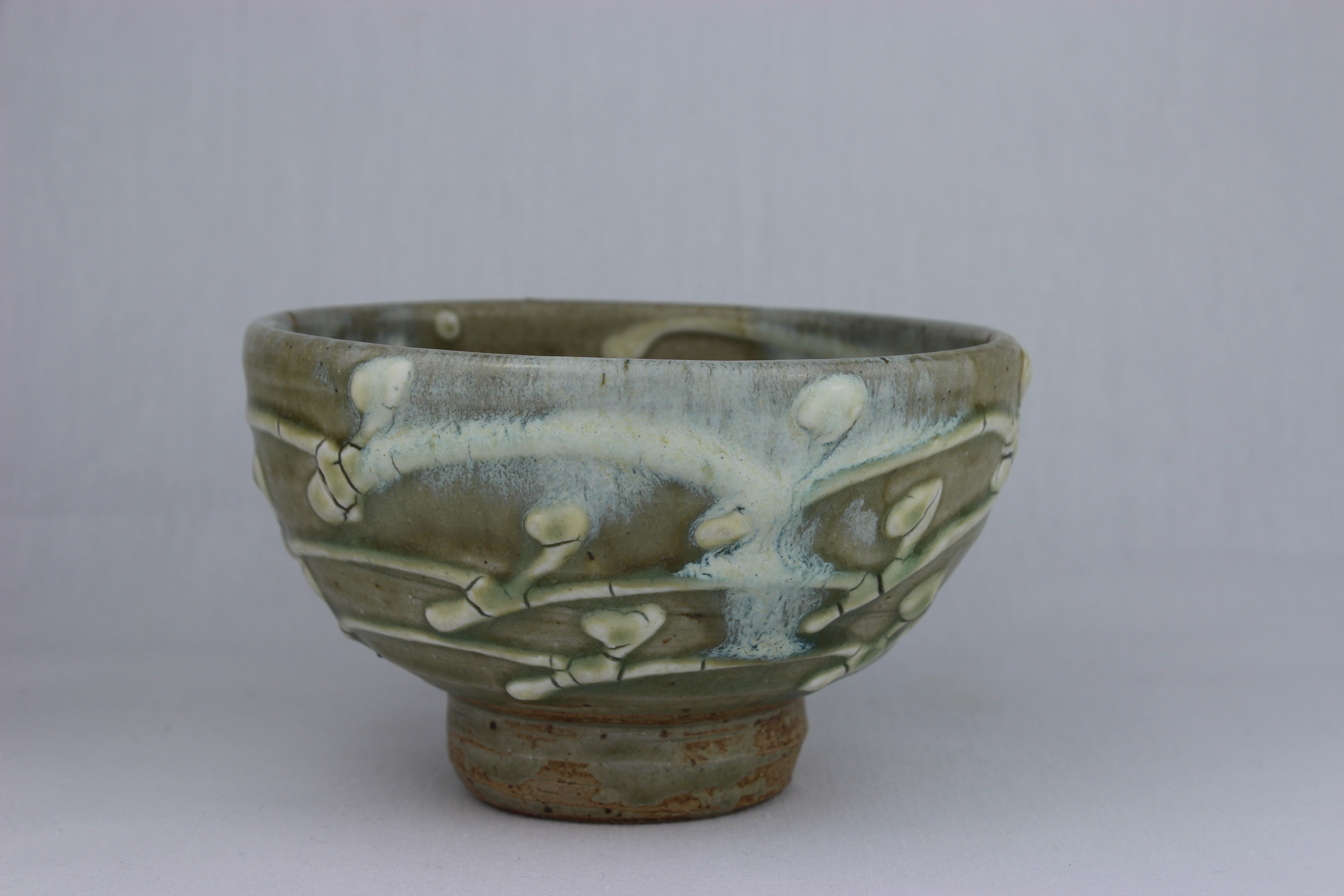
Thrown, Slip Trailed Bowl by Takeshi Yasuda

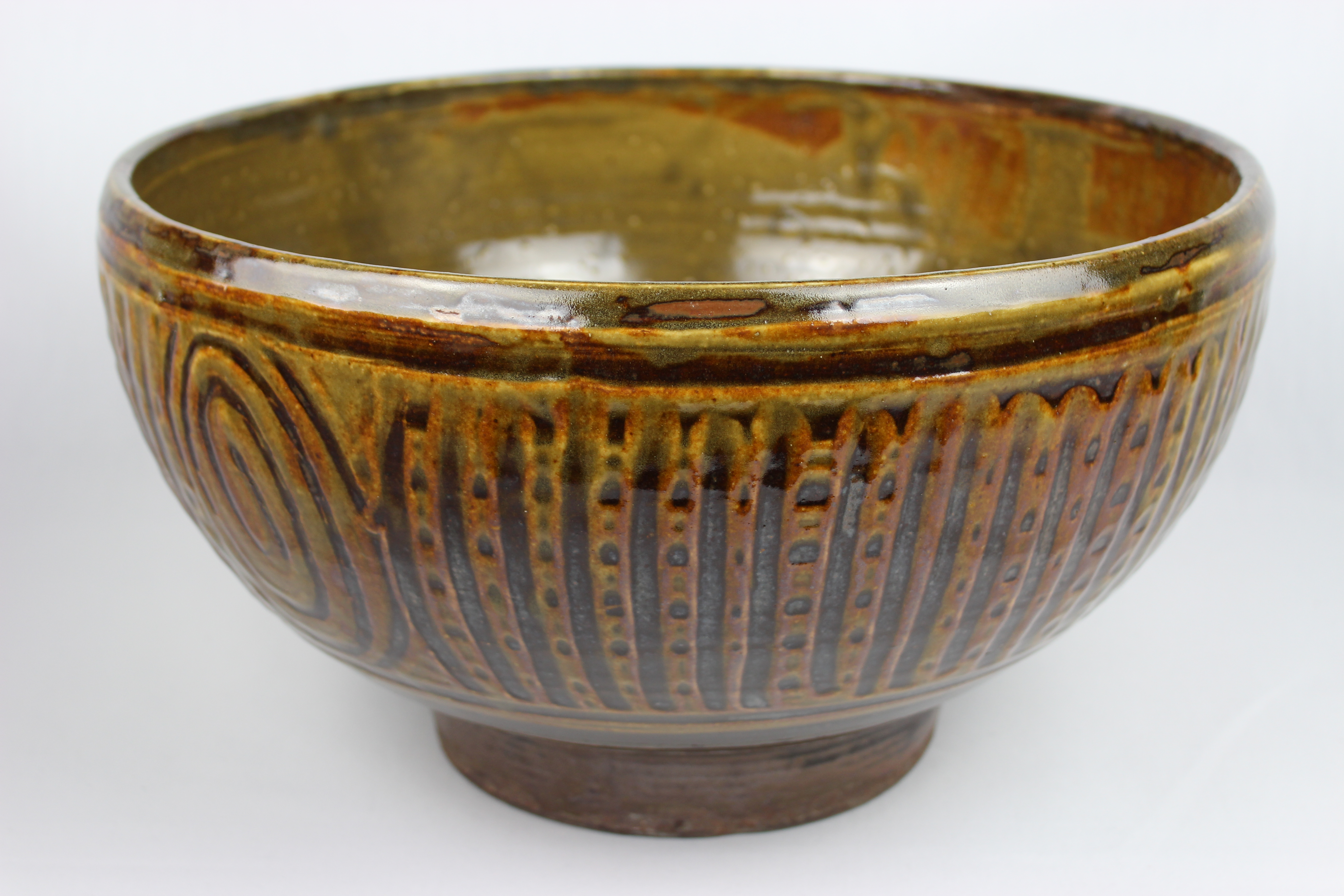
Thrown Bowl by Michael Cardew

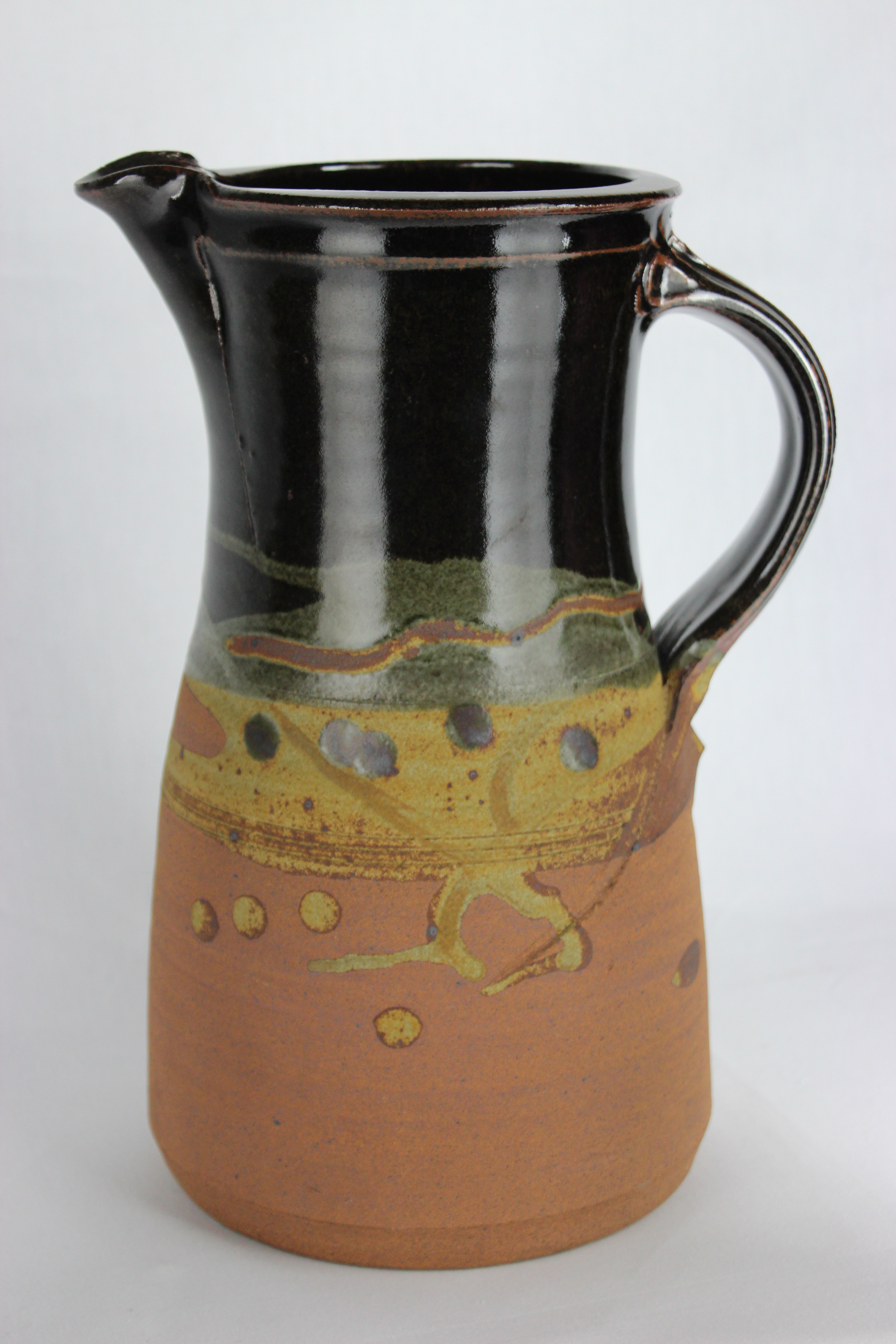
Thrown jug by Michael Casson

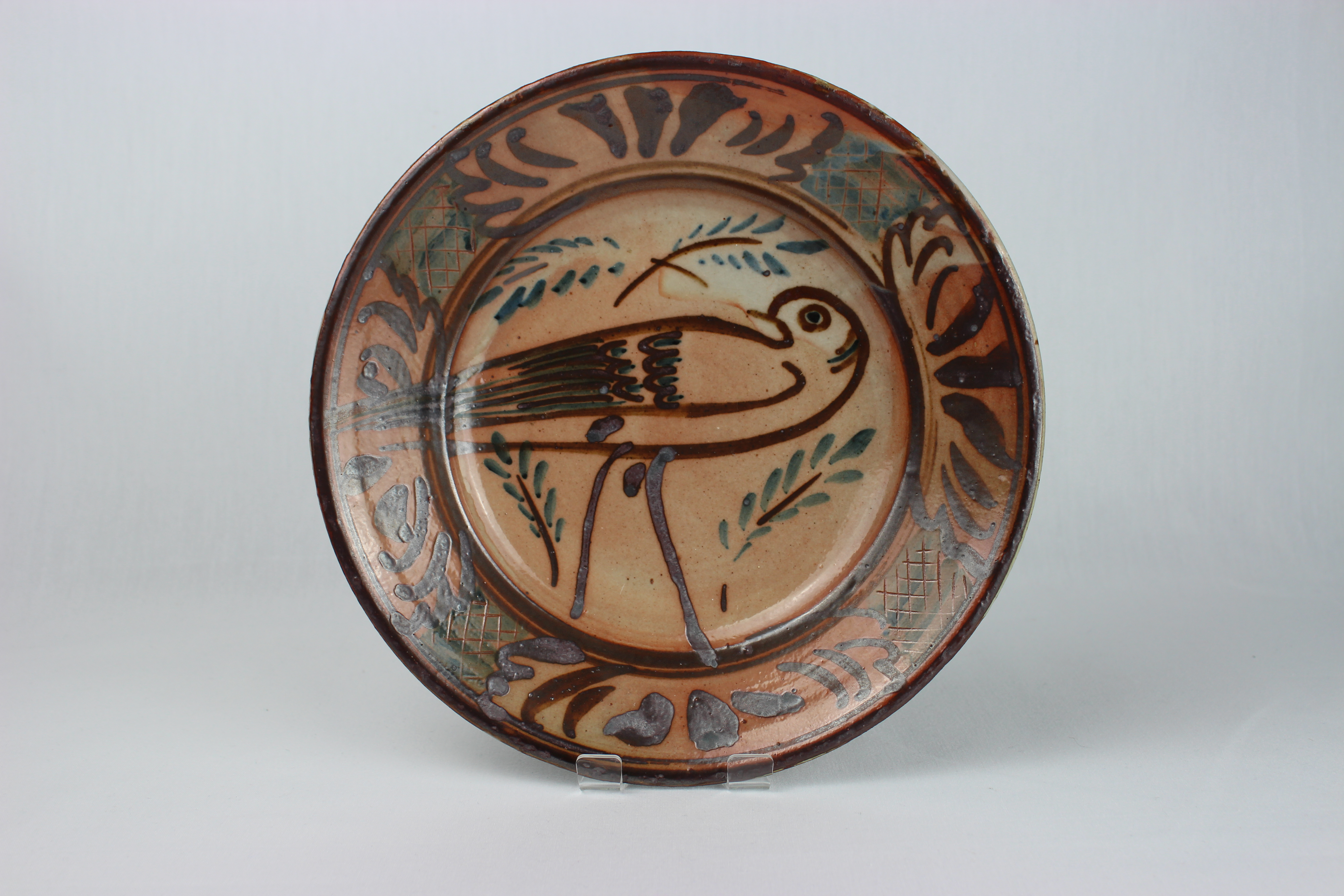
Thrown plate by Seth Cardew

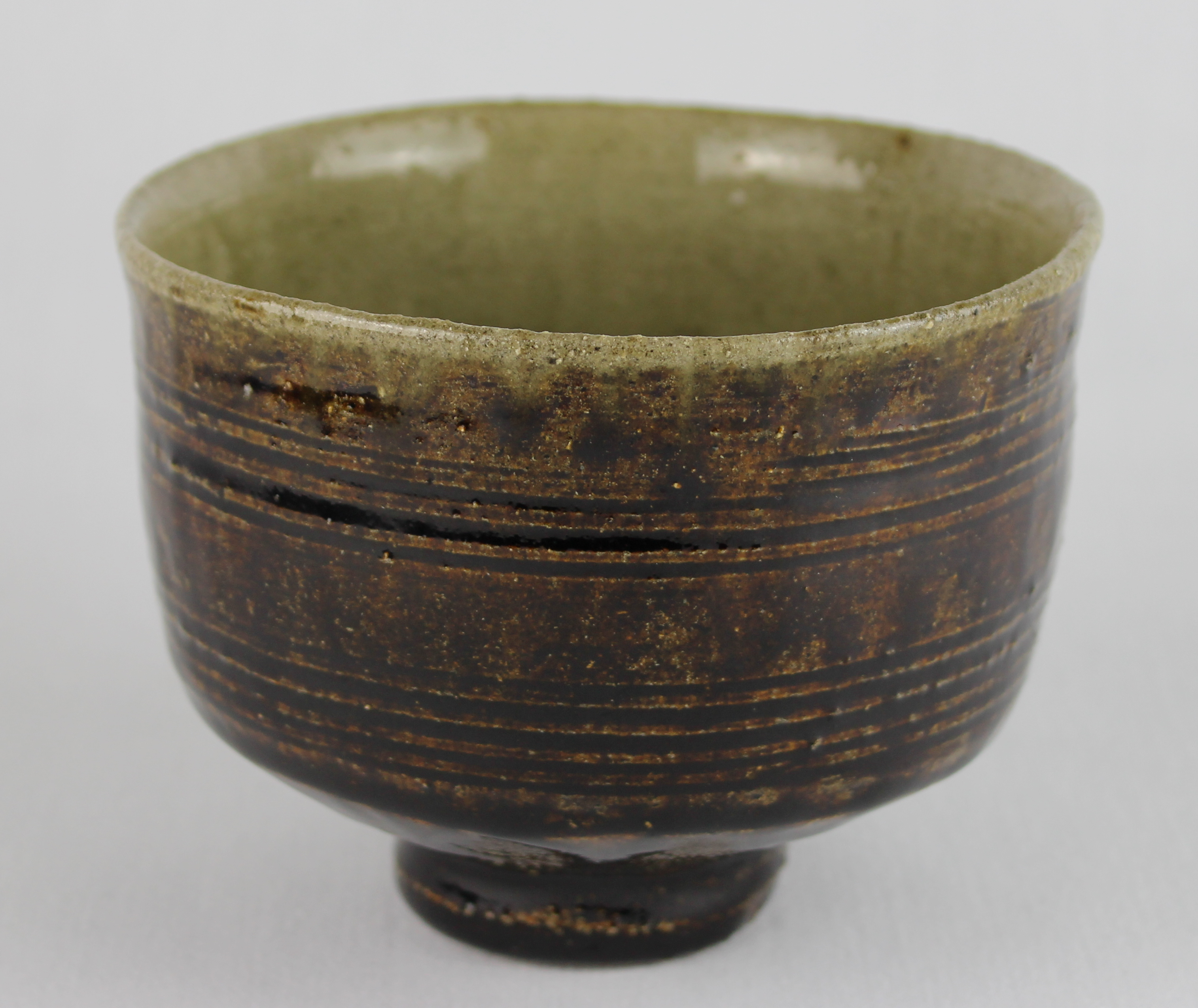
Thrown, Combed tea bowl by Shoji Hamada

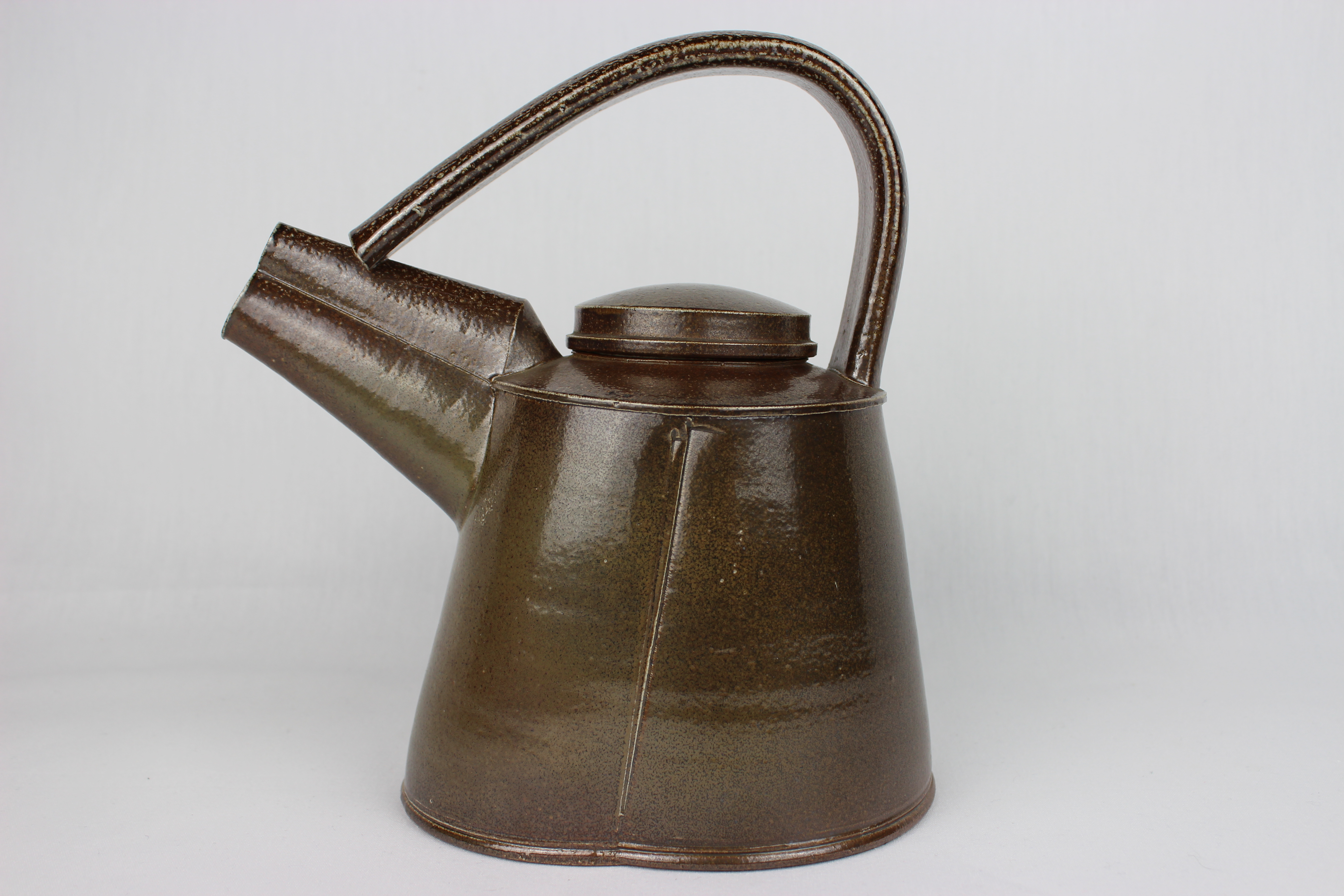
Thrown, Altered, Salt Glazed teapot by Walter Keeler.

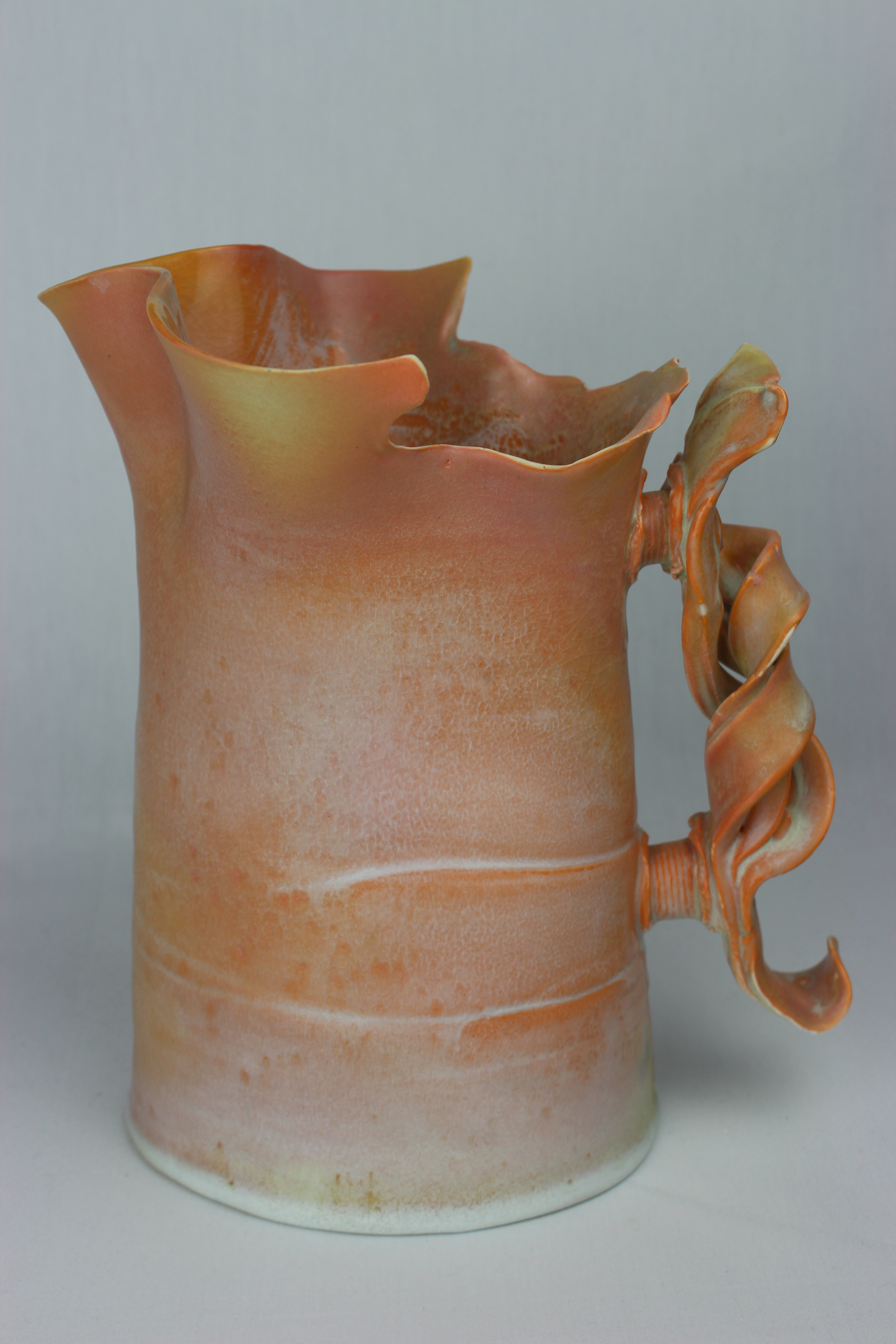
Thrown, Altered jug by Colin Pearson

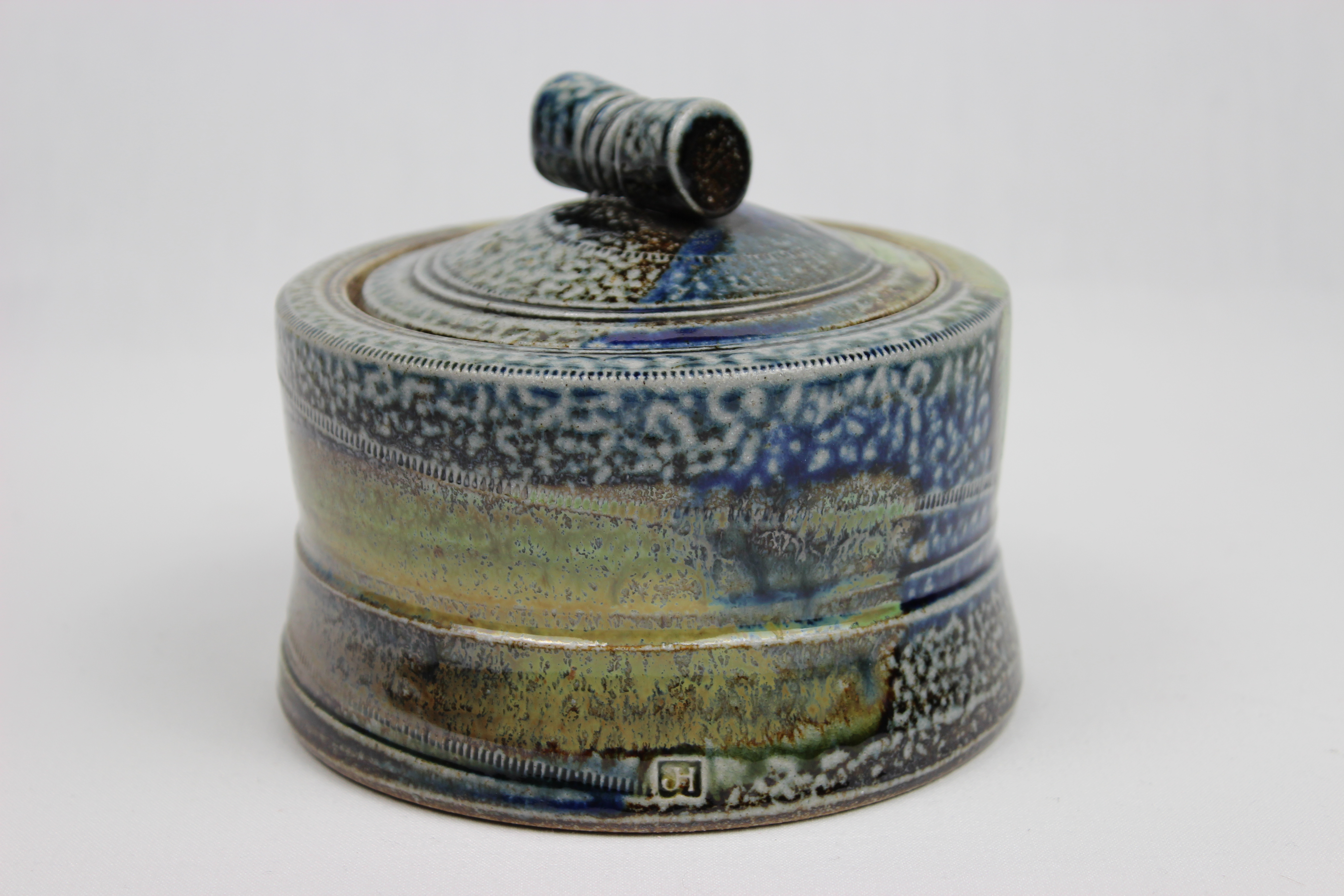
Thrown, salt glazed lidded box by Jane Hamlyn

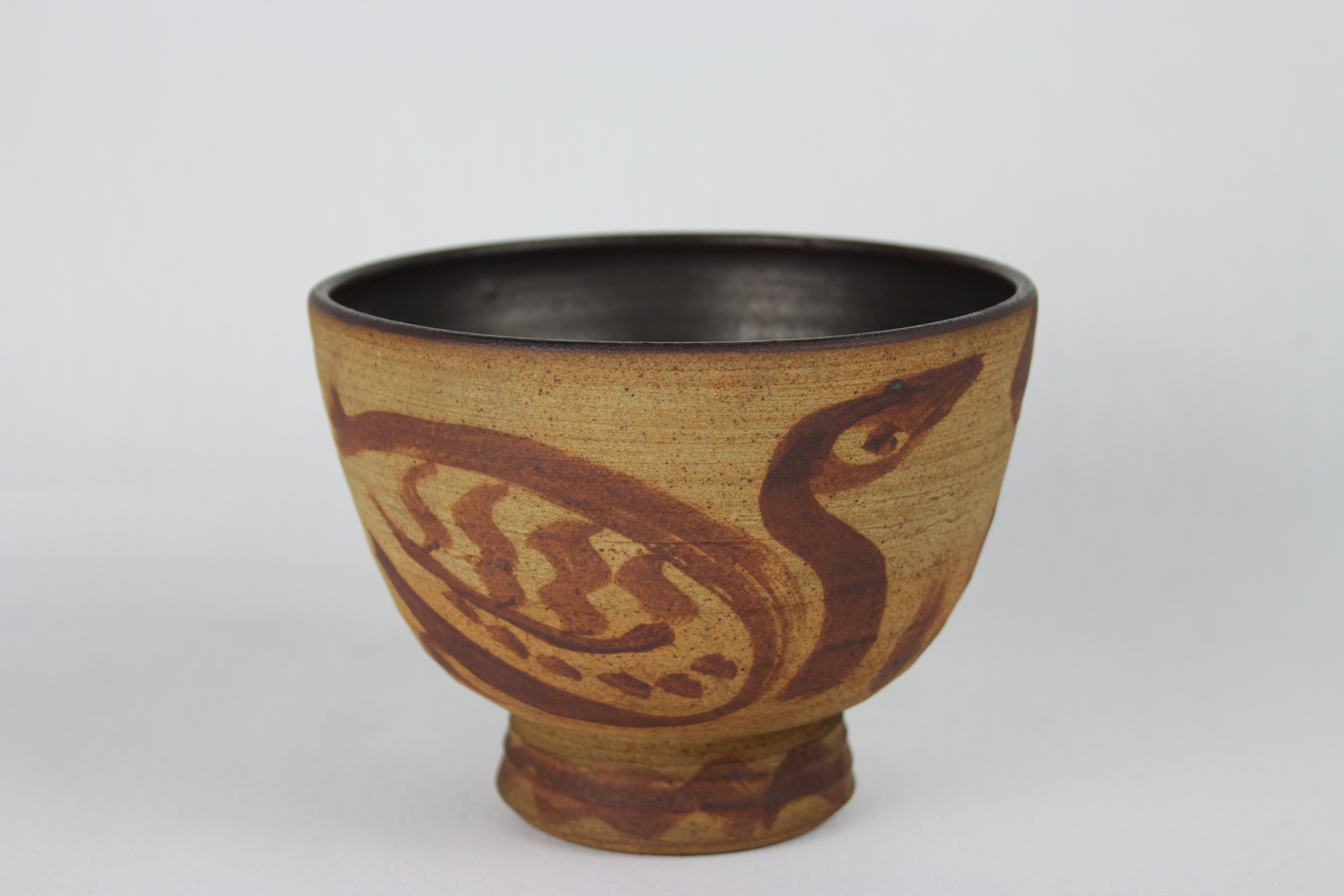
Thrown Bowl by William Staite Murray

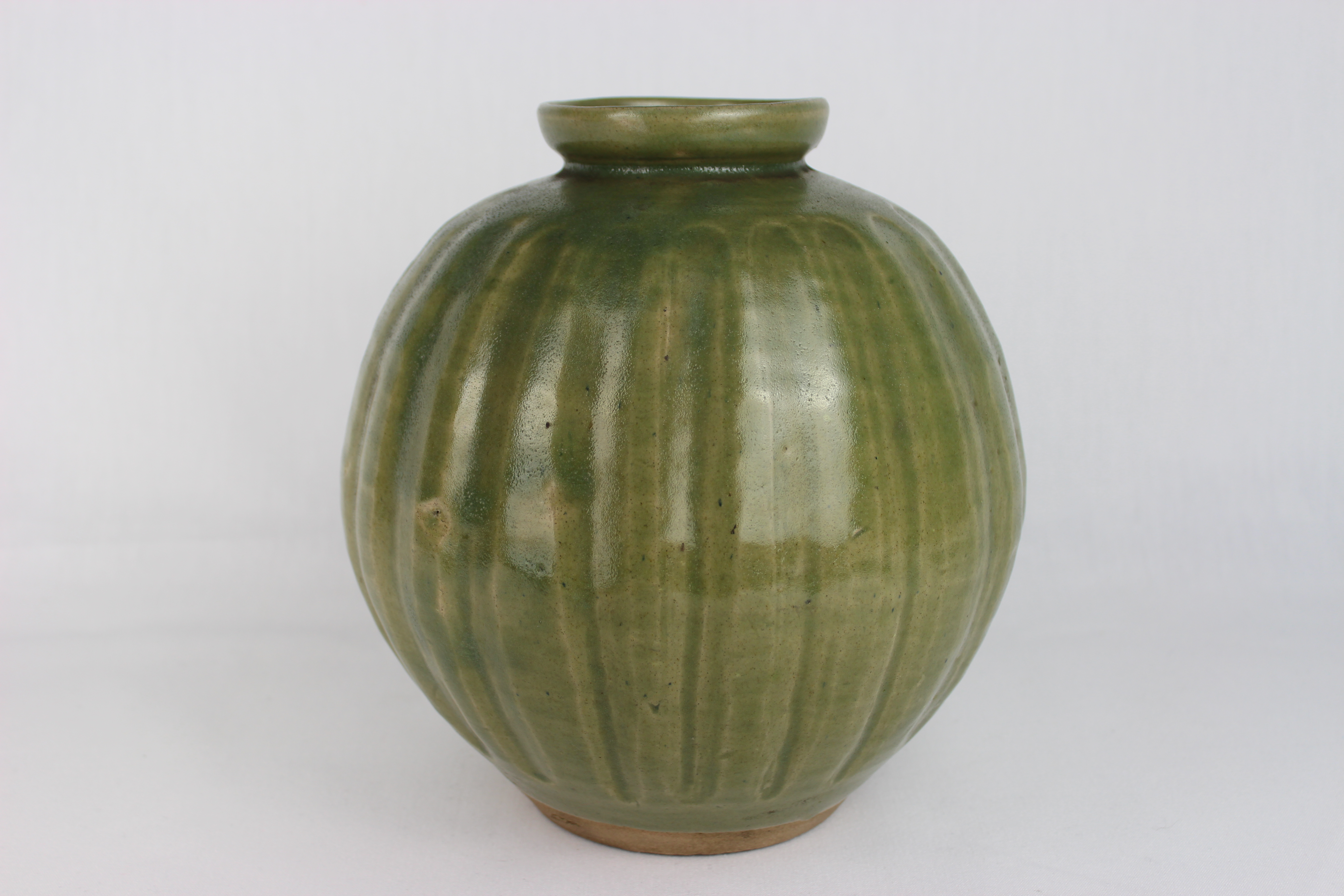
Thrown, Fluted jar by Katherine Pleydell-Bouverie
