= Y Lle Celf =

Welsh art exhibition

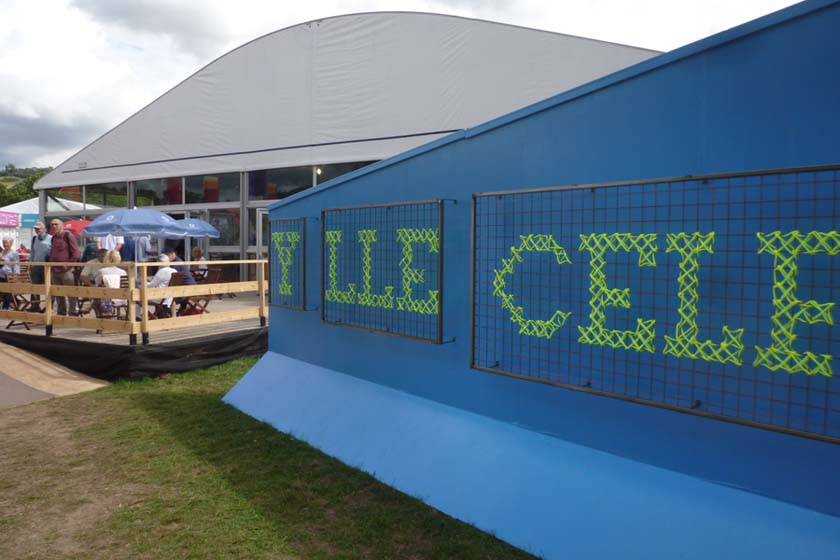
Y Lle Celf's temporary pavilion at Abergavenny in 2016

Y Lle Celf (Welsh for 'the art place', Welsh pronunciation: [ə ɬɛ kɛlv]) is an annual art, craft and architecture exhibition held during the National Eisteddfod of Wales, claimed to be the biggest temporary art exhibition in Europe.

== Description ==
Y Lle Celf is created every year for the duration of the National Eisteddfod of Wales, the country's celebration of Welsh language and culture. The exhibition is organised by the National Eisteddfod and supported by the Arts Council of Wales.

To exhibit in the exhibition, artists and designers must be either born in Wales, have Welsh parents, or have lived or worked in Wales for at least three years prior to the submission deadline, or have the ability to speak, read or write Welsh. In 2010, exhibitors were chosen from 2,500 entries. Forty finalists were chosen to exhibit. The final selection is chosen by a panel of experts.

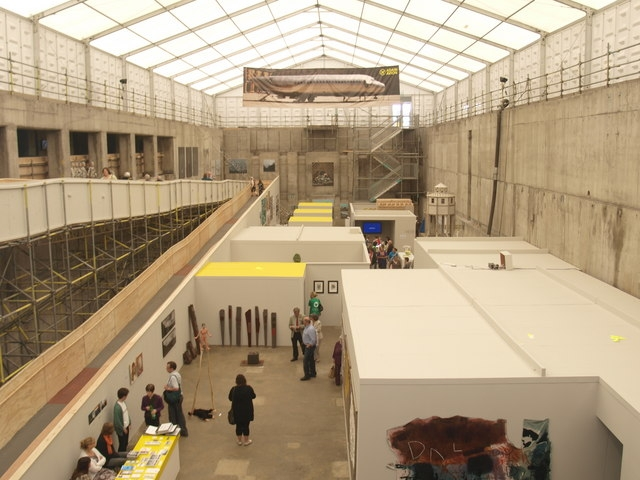
Y Lle Celf at Ebbw Vale (2010)

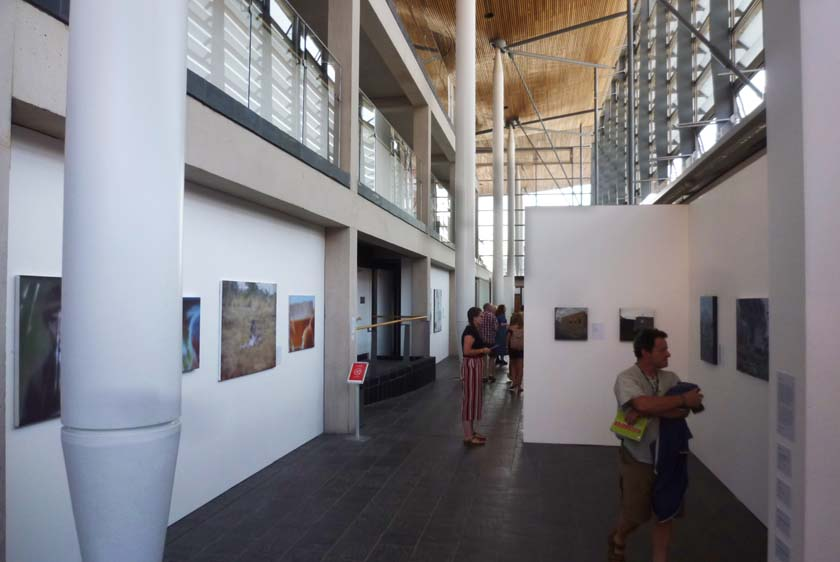
Y Lle Celf at the Senedd (2018)

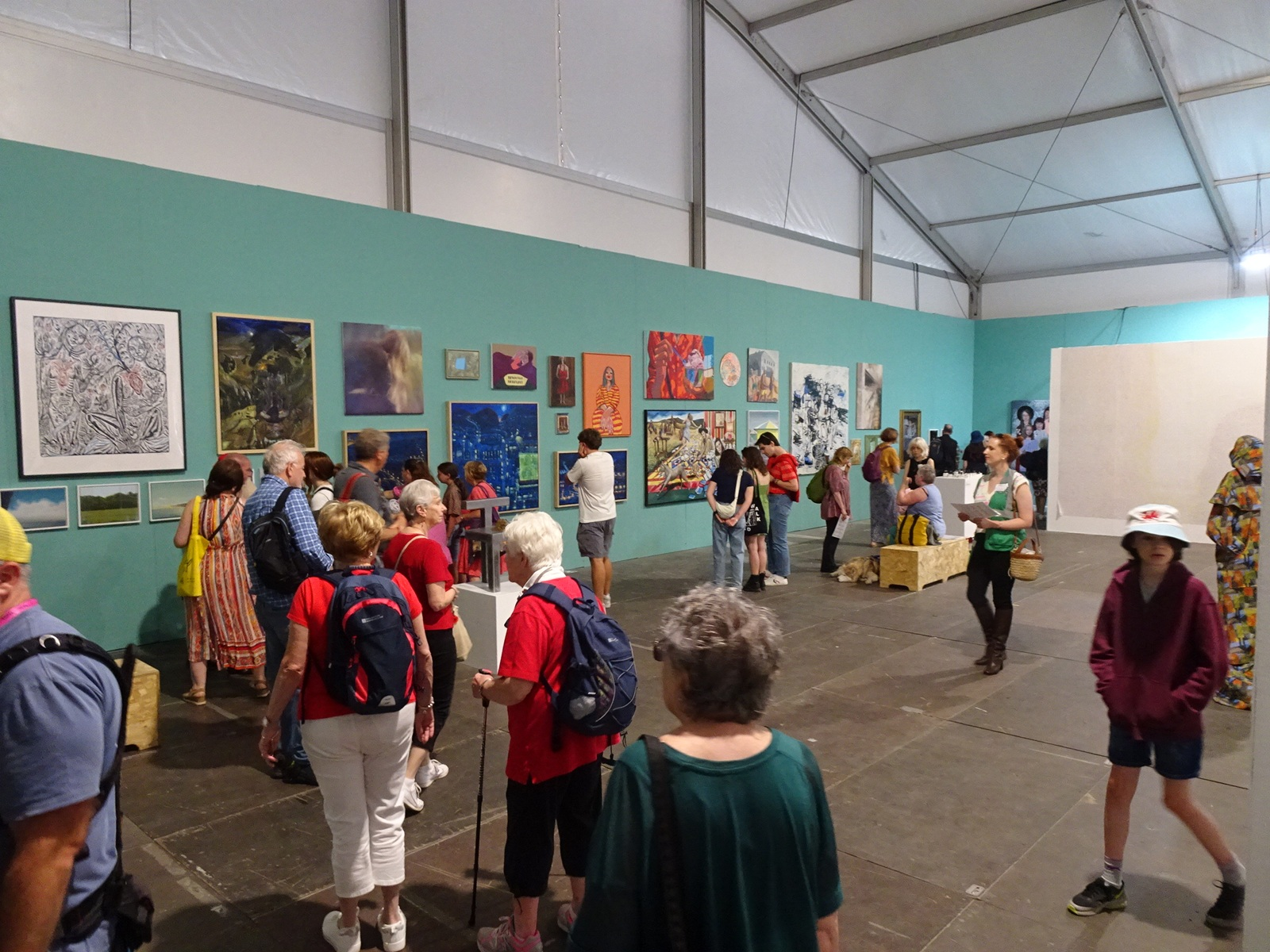
Y Lle Celf at the National Eisteddfod in Pontypridd

Y Lle Celf is usually housed in a temporary building on the Eisteddfod grounds, though at Ebbw Vale in 2010 it was held in the disused basement of a steel rolling mill and, in Cardiff Bay at the fenceless Eisteddfod in 2018, was held inside the Welsh Government Senedd building.

== Controversies ==
In 2012, the Eisteddfod were forced to issue an apology and withdraw four portrait paintings, by artist David Rees Davies, which showed imagery related to a nearby murder of a schoolgirl. One of the paintings appeared to portray the bleeding victim, another showed her killer.

In 2013, the Gold Medal for Fine Art was won by video artist Josephine Sowden, despite her work using English-language-based gibberish and seemingly flouting a Welsh-only language rule dating back to 1950. The 2013 Ivor Davies Award winner, Iwan Bala, had included English and Spanish text in his paintings, in addition to Welsh. For 2014 entries, application forms drew attention to the language rule, which says any original words in art works must be in Welsh.

== Awards and prizes ==
Each year the following are awarded to an exhibitor at Y Lle Celf:

- Gold Medal for Fine Art (since 1951)
- Gold Medal for Craft and Design (since 1985)
- Gold Medal for Architecture (since 1954)
- Young Artist Scholarship
- Architecture Scholarship
- The Ivor Davies Award (since 2003), for the work that best conveys the spirit of activism in the struggle for language, culture and politics.
- The Josef Herman Award - The People's Choice, awarded since 1995 to the most popular work as voted by visitors to the exhibition.
- The Tony Goble Award (since 2012), for work by an artist exhibiting for the first time.

== See also ==
- Gold Medal (National Eisteddfod of Wales)
