= Gareth Griffith =

Gareth Griffith (born 1940) is a Welsh painter and sculptor. He won the Gold Medal for Fine Art at the 2025 National Eisteddfod of Wales.

== Background ==
Gareth Griffith was born in Bangor, North Wales in 1940. He is the son of Robin Griffith, a well-known illustrator for children's Welsh language comics. Griffith studied at Liverpool College of Art before taking up a career as an artist and art teacher in Liverpool, Jamaica and North Wales.

== Art ==
After retiring from teaching, Griffith built an art studio in his garden. His artworks can be two and three-dimensional.

In 2013 Griffith held an exhibition, named "Triad", at St David's Hall, Cardiff, jointly with his sons Morgan and Ioan. The exhibition included Griffith's "Blue Tent" installation as well as some large scale paintings.

In 2012 Griffith was the winner of the Welsh Artist of the Year Painting Prize.

On 2 August 2025 Griffiths was announced as the winner of the Gold Medal for Fine Art at the 2025 National Eisteddfod of Wales. He had been exhibiting at the National Eisteddfod since the 1970s.

Examples of his works are in the public collections of the National Museum Cardiff, the Walker Art Gallery and the Southbank Centre (Arts Council Collection).

== Personal life ==
Griffith's three sons, Dafydd (designer), Ioan (art teacher) and Morgan (collage artist), have each taken up a career in art and design.
