= Loyn & Co =

Loyn & Co logo

Loyn & Co Architects is an architectural firm based in Penarth near Cardiff, Wales. It was founded by the architect Chris Loyn in 1987.

The practice has twice won the Gold Medal for Architecture at the National Eisteddfod of Wales, in 2007 and 2014. Stormy Castle, the home that won the 2014 medal, also won the 2014 Manser Medal from the Royal Institute of British Architects (RIBA).

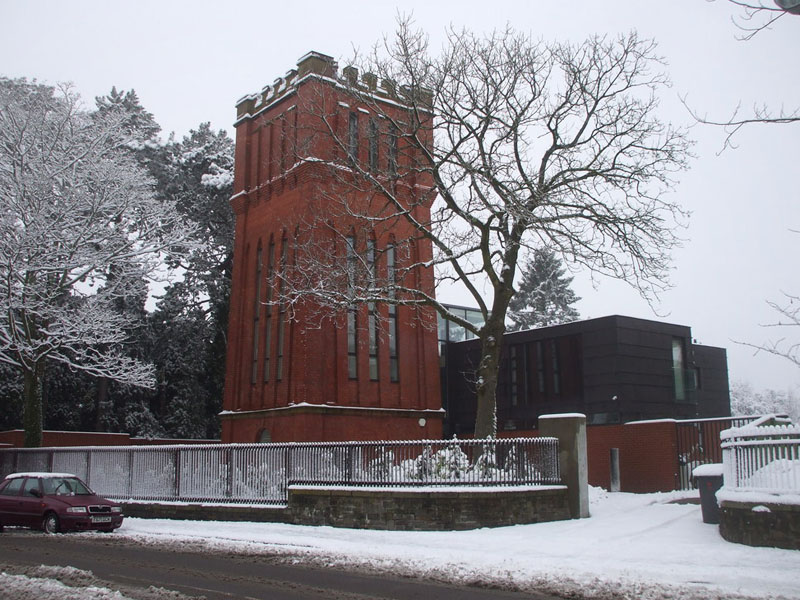
Converted water tower, Cyncoed, Cardiff

== Notable projects ==
- Outhouse, Forest of Dean, Gloucestershire, an earth-sheltered house on a rural hillside for two artists. It was shortlisted for the 2016 Stirling Prize and won the BBC News readers' favorite public vote.
- Upside Down House, Dinas Powys, Vale of Glamorgan and Millbrook House, Cardiff - both shortlisted for the Gold Medal for Architecture 2015.
- Stormy Castle, a sustainable home on the Gower Peninsula - winner of the Eisteddfod Gold Medal for Architecture 2014 and the RIBA Manser Medal.
- Water Tower (residential conversion), Cyncoed, Cardiff - winner of the Gold Medal for Architecture 2007, breaking the Eisteddfod's normal tradition of making the award for a public building.
- Raisdale Road, Penarth (2001), Loyn & Co's first newbuild property and winner of a Welsh Housing Design Award in 2002.
- St Donat's Arts Centre, modern theatre extension to a 14th-century barn (1995)
