= Phil Rogers (potter) =

Welsh potter (1951–2020)

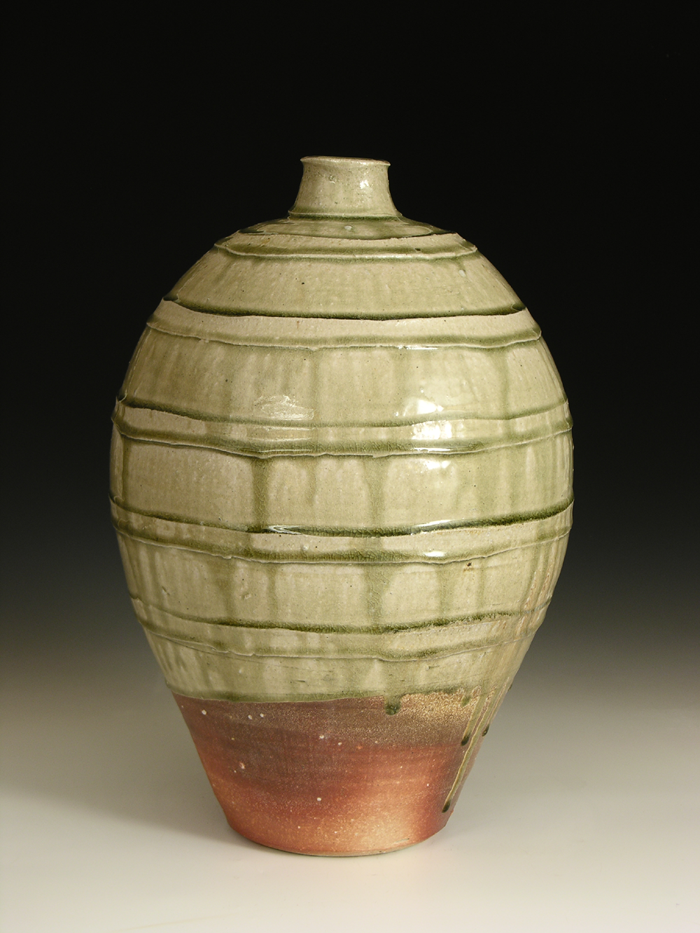
Wood fired bottle with an ash glaze by Phil Rogers

Philip Rogers (28 May 1951 – 22 December 2020) was a Welsh studio potter who has been featured in a number of books on studio pottery and worked at Lower Cefnfaes Farm's Marston Pottery from 1984 until his death in December 2020 and previously in Rhayader, Powys, Wales, from 1978 to 1984.

Phil Rogers was born in Newport in south Wales, and taught for 5 years in secondary schools before becoming a full-time, professional potter in 1978.

He was chairman of the Craft Potters Association of Great Britain for four years from 1994 to 1998 and has exhibited widely in the United Kingdom, Japan, South Korea and the USA. He was also a member of the International Academy of Ceramics.

In 2014, he was the subject of the short documentary film, Drawing in the Air, filmed by Goldmark Gallery.

Rogers’ work is represented in more than 40 museums including the permanent collections of the Victoria and Albert Museum, the Boston Museum of Fine Arts, the Cleveland Museum of Art and the Museum of Contemporary Ceramics in Mashiko.

Rogers died on 22 December 2020 after a short illness.

== Publications ==
- Throwing Pots Gentle Breeze Pub Co (September 1995) ISBN 978-1889250045
- Ash Glazes Chilton Book Company (15 January 1996) ASIN B00NBHTW8K
- Salt Glazing University of Pennsylvania Press (6 August 2002) ISBN 978-0812236897
- Phil Rogers Potter Pucker Gallery (15 January 2007) ISBN 978-1879985162
