= Gold Medal (National Eisteddfod of Wales) =

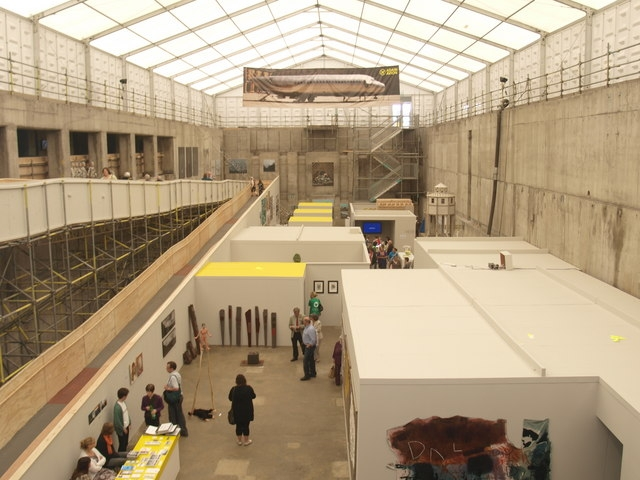
- Y Lle Celf in the basement of a steelworks at the 2010 Eisteddfod in Blaenau Gwent
- Native name: Medal Aur
- Description: Excellence in Fine Art, Architecture, or Craft and Design
- Country: Wales
- Presented by: National Eisteddfod of Wales

The Gold Medal (Welsh: Medal Aur) of the National Eisteddfod of Wales is awarded annually in three categories for excellence in Fine Art, Architecture, or Craft and Design.

== Background ==
The National Eisteddfod of Wales is Wales' most important national cultural event, taking place annually. Its open exhibition of art and craft, Y Lle Celf (Welsh: 'The Art Space') is one of the highlights of the Welsh arts calendar. Gold medals are awarded in the Visual Arts section for outstanding contributions in different media: a gold medal for fine art has been awarded since 1951; a medal for Architecture has been offered since 1954 (though withheld and not awarded between 1954 and 1959); and a gold medal for craft and design has been awarded since 1985.

Other awards are the Tony Goble Award, given to a first time exhibitor, and the Josef Herman Award, chosen by the public (Josef Herman, a Polish emigree, won the Fine Art medal in 1962).

The Architecture award was endowed by Thomas Alwyn Lloyd and is given in conjunction with the Design Commission for Wales and the Royal Society of Architects in Wales, who advise the Eisteddfod judges.

The award is given to practitioners working in Wales, and a language rule has been in force since 1950 that any original words in art works must be in the Welsh language. In 2013 there was controversy when a video entirely in English by England-born University of Wales Newport student Josephine Sowden was awarded the Fine Art medal.

In January 2014 the Wales Millennium Centre (WMC) and Craft in the Bay, Cardiff held an exhibition showcasing the work of previous winners of the Fine Art and the Craft awards.

The 2014 Open Exhibition exhibited the work of 44 artists, selected from 300 entries.

== Winners ==
=== Fine Art ===
Source: The National Eisteddfod of Wales unless otherwise stated

- 2025 – Gareth Griffith (who had been exhibiting at the Eisteddfod since the 1970s) for his five paintings.
- 2024 – Angharad Pearce Jones. Her work formed the entrance to Y Lle Celf's exhibition, channelling visitors on either side of a metal fence.
- 2023 – John Rowley
- 2022 – Seán Vicary, for his animated video, Sitelines.
- 2016 – Richard Bevan, for a collection of short films shown on projectors
- 2015 – Glyn Baines - aged 84 the award's oldest ever winner
- 2014 – Sean Edwards, for his video Maelfa of a shopping centre in Llanedeyrn, Cardiff
- 2013 – Josephine Sowden, for her video The Lilies of the Field
- 2012 – Carwyn Evans, for his installations based on agricultural machinery
- 2011 – Bedwyr Williams, for his mixed media work including carved wellington boots stuffed with straw
- 2010 – Simon Fenoulhet
- 2009 – Elfyn Lewis
- 2008 – David Hastie
- 2007 – Emrys Williams, for his paintings of imaginary landscapes.
- 2006 – Aled Rhys Hughes
- 2005 – Peter Finnemore
- 2004 – Stuart Lee
- 2003 – Tim Davies
- 2002 – Ifor Davies
- 2001 – Phil Nicol
- 2000 – Sue Williams
- 1999 – Lois Williams
- 1998 – Brendan Burns
- 1997 – Iwan Bala
- 1996 – No winner
- 1995 – Paul Brewer
- 1994 – Mary Griffiths
- 1993 – Brendan Burns
- 1992 – Shani Rhys James
- 1991 – No winner
- 1990 – Gareth Hugh Davies
- 1989 – No winner
- 1988 – Keith Roberts
- 1987 – Keith Bowen
- 1986 – Simon Callery
- 1985 – Alistair Crawford
- 1968–1984 – Medal not offered
- 1967 – No winner
- 1966 – Merlyn Evans
- 1965 – No winner
- 1964 – David Jones
- 1963 – Medal not offered
- 1962 – Josef Herman
- 1961 – Ceri Richards
- 1959–1960 – Medal not offered
- 1958 – Denys Short
- 1957 – George Chapman
- 1956 – John Elwyn
- 1955 – D. C. Roberts
- 1954 – Charles Burton
- 1953 – Brenda Chamberlain
- 1952 – Medal not offered
- 1951 – Brenda Chamberlain

=== Architecture ===
- 2025 – London-based Manalo & White, for their conversion of St Mary’s Church, Bangor, into an arts and performance space.
- 2024 – Claire Priest and Ben Crawley, Studio Brassica, for a stable block conversion near Raglan.
- 2023 – Nidus Architects and Rural Office, for their extension of a 17-century Welsh longhouse Pen-y-common near Hay-on-Wye
- 2022 – Medal not awarded.
- 2019 – Featherstone Young, London, for Tŷ Pawb, Wrexham
- 2018 – KKE Architects, Worcester, for their work on St Davids Hospice Care in Newport
- 2017 – Stride Treglown, for Ysgol Bae Baglan, Port Talbot
- 2016 – Hall & Bednarczyk, for the Visitor and Water Sports Centre, Llandegfedd
- 2015 – Loyn & Co, for Millbrook House, in Lisvane, Cardiff. This was the first time since 1985 that a winner had won two years in succession.
- 2014 – Loyn & Co, for 'Stormy Castle', a sustainable home on the Gower Peninsula
- 2013 – John Pardey Architects, for 'Trewarren', a house in Pembrokeshire
- 2012 – HLM Architects, for Archbishop McGrath Catholic High School, Bridgend
- 2011 – Ellis Williams Architects, for Oriel Mostyn, Llandudno
- 2010 – Medal not awarded
- 2009 – Ray Hole Architects, for Hafod Eryri visitor centre, Snowdon
- 2008 – Purcell Miller Tritton, for Blaenavon World Heritage Centre, Blaenavon
- 2007 – Loyn & Co, for the Water Tower, Cyncoed, Cardiff, breaking the normal tradition of making the award for a public building.
- 2006 – Richard Rogers, for the Senedd, Cardiff
- 2005 – Capita Percy Thomas, Cardiff, for the Wales Millennium Centre, Cardiff
- 2004 – Powell Dobson Architects, Cardiff, for the Brewery Quarter area, Cardiff
- 2003 – Nicholas Hare Architects, London, for No 1 Callaghan Square, Cardiff
- 2002 – Pembroke Design Ltd, Pembroke Dock, for Ysgol Bro Dewi, St Davids
- 2001 – David Lea and Pat Borer, Pen-y-bont Fawr, for WISE at the Centre for Alternative Technology, Machynlleth
- 2000 – Foster + Partners, London, for the Great Glasshouse, National Botanic Garden of Wales, Llanarthne
- 1999 – Smith Roberts Associates, Bristol, for the Pembrokeshire Coast National Park Visitor Centre, St Davids
- 1998 – Arup, London, for the Control Techniques Research and Development HQ, Newtown
- 1997 – PCKO Architects, Middlesex, for The Swansea Foyer, Swansea
- 1996 – Holder Mathias Alcock, Cardiff, for the NCM Building (now Atradius), Cardiff Bay
- 1995 – No medal awarded
- 1994 – No medal awarded
- 1993 – Niall Phillips Architects, Bristol, for Lower Treginnis Farm, St Davids
- 1992 – No medal awarded
- 1991 – Allen Jenkins and Phil Read, South Glamorgan County Council, for the County Hall, Butetown, Cardiff
- 1990 – No medal awarded
- 1989 – No medal awarded
- 1988 – Welsh Health Common Services Authority, for the Ystradgynlais Community Hospital, Ystradgynlais, Powys
- 1987 – Merfyn Roberts and Dewi-Prys Thomas, for Gwynedd Council, Caernarfon
- 1986 – Welsh Health Common Services Authority Architects, for the Mold Community Hospital, Mold, Flintshire
- 1985 – Bowen Dann Davies Partnership, Colwyn Bay, for National Outdoor Centre for Wales, Plas Menai
- 1984 – Bowen Dann Davies Partnership, Colwyn Bay, for Capel y Groes, Wrexham
- 1983 – Percy Thomas Partnership, Cardiff, for Amersham International Laboratories, Cardiff
- 1982 – Bowen Dann Davies Partnership, Colwyn Bay, for Hafan Elen, Llanrug, Caernarfon
- 1981 – No medal awarded
- 1980 – No medal awarded
- 1979 – Percy Thomas Partnership, Cardiff, for the Hugh Owen Building, Aberystwyth University, Aberystwyth
- 1978 – Percy Thomas Partnership, Cardiff, for St Fagans National Museum of History, St Fagans, Cardiff
- 1977 – Bowen Dann Partnership for the Hostel, Cefndy Road, Rhyl
- 1976 – Percy Thomas Partnership, Cardiff, for the Parke-Davis Pharmaceutical Building, Pontypool
- 1975 – John Sam Williams, Pwllheli, for the Special School in Y Ffôr, Pwllheli
- 1974 – Percy Thomas Partnership, Cardiff, for Albert Edward Prince of Wales Court Care Home, Porthcawl
- 1973 – No medal awarded
- 1972 – T G Jones and J R Evans, for Little Orchard, Dinas Powys
- 1971 – Percy Thomas Partnership, Cardiff, for the Great Hall and Students Union, Aberystwyth University, Aberystwyth
- 1970 – Sir Percy Thomas and Son, Cardiff, for the Physics and Mathematics Building, Swansea University, Swansea
- 1969 – Ormrod Partnership, Liverpool, for the Pilkington Perkin-Elmer Building, St Asaph
- 1968 – Hird & Brooks, Cardiff, for The Gore (house and swimming pool), Llantrisant Road, Llandaff, Cardiff
- 1967 – No medal awarded
- 1966-61 – Medal not offered
- 1960 – G Grenfell Baines & Hargreaves, Preston, for the H. J. Heinz Offices, Cardiff
- 1959-54 – No medal awarded

=== Craft and design ===
Source: The National Eisteddfod of Wales unless stated otherwise

- 2025 – Verity Pulford, for her colourful glass models of bird skulls.
- 2024 – Laura Thomas
- 2023 – Dan Griffiths
- 2022 – Natalia Dias
- 2016 – Lisa Kriegel, from New York but based in Cardiff, for 18 stoneware towers
- 2015 – Rhian Hâf, for her glasswork collection, Cipio Eiliadau (Captured Moments)
- 2014 – Susan Phillips for her ceramic sculptures
- 2013 – Josephine Sowden for her video The Lilies of the Field.
- 2012 – Anne Gibbs, for her ceramic and found media assemblages
- 2011 – Peter Bodenham (Head of Ceramics at Coleg Sir Gâr)
- 2010 – Natalia Dias
- 2009 – Lowri Davies
- 2008 – Suzie Horan
- 2007 – Medal not awarded, "although the submission included work of quality, there was not enough of it."
- 2006 – Carol Gwizdak
- 2005 – Pamela Rawnsley
- 2004 – Walter Keeler
- 2003 – Mari Thomas
- 2002 – No winner
- 2001 – Claire Curneen
- 2000 – Christine Jones
- 1999 – David Binns
- 1998 – Catrin Howell
- 1997 – Marcelle Davies
- 1996 – Steve Howlett
- 1995 – Gavin Fraser Williams
- 1994 – Marcus Thomas
- 1993 – Ann Catrin Evans
- 1992 – Cefyn Burgess
- 1991 – Linda Roberts
- 1990 – Morgen Hall
- 1989 – No winner
- 1988 – Jaqueline Jones
- 1987 – Eleri Mills
- 1986 – Gina Raby
- 1985 – Martin Fraser (first winner)

Arts and Craft / Gelfyddyd a Chrefft

- 1974 - Harry Meadows
- 1976 - Harry Meadows

== See also ==
- List of European art awards
