= Simon Callery =

English painter (born 1960)

Simon Callery (born 1960 in London) is an English artist.

== Life and work ==
He was educated at Campions school, Athens, Greece, and gained a first-class honours degree from Cardiff College of Art in 1983. He has worked in Turin, and is now resident in London.

Callery won the Gold Medal for Fine Art at the 1986 National Eisteddfod of Wales.

He exhibited at the Whitechapel Open in 1989. He paints cityscapes that are abstracted to the point of making them conceptual images.

In 1994, Callery was included in the exhibition Young British Artists III at the Saatchi Gallery. In 1996 he was one of 19 artists chosen for an exhibition, at the Oxford Museum of Modern Art, of the best of British painting in the Nineties.

In January 1999, the Saatchi Gallery gave the Arts Council collection 100 works, including work by Callery. The collection is administered by the Hayward Gallery, which arranges loans to regional museums.

April–August 2003, Callery created The Segsbury Project, working with archeologists on a Bronze Age ditch and an Iron Age hill fort on the Ridgeway in Wiltshire and Oxfordshire. The project included sculpture and photographs. This major exhibition was displayed at only two venues in the UK, Dover Castle and the Storey Gallery

Other exhibitions include Art Now at Tate Britain, and Galerie Philippe Casini, Paris (2002).

His work is held in the collection of the Tate, Birmingham Museums and the Arts Council Collection at the Southbank Centre.
