= Capel House =

House in Llandaff, Wales

Coordinates: 51.4972°N 3.2300°W

Capel House (now known as The Gore) is a detached house at 25 Llantrisant Road in the Llandaff district of Cardiff, Wales. It was designed by the Welsh modernist architect Graham Brooks of Hird & Brooks and built in 1966. It is noted for its distinctive modernist use of painted white brick, exposed timber joints and a flat roof.

Brooks was greatly influenced by Danish modernist architecture, and had designed his personal residence in a modernist style in 1964. Capel House was awarded the T. Alwyn Lloyd memorial Gold Medal for Architecture at the National Eisteddfod of Wales of 1968. Capel House was the model for Hird & Brooks's The Mount development of sixteen single-storey houses in Dinas Powys.

It was featured in the Daily Mail Book of Bungalow Plans 1968/69, and Alan Powers' 2007 book Britain: Modern Architectures in History.

The house received a Commendation in the Civic Trust Awards of 1966.
