= Seth Cardew =

English studio potter

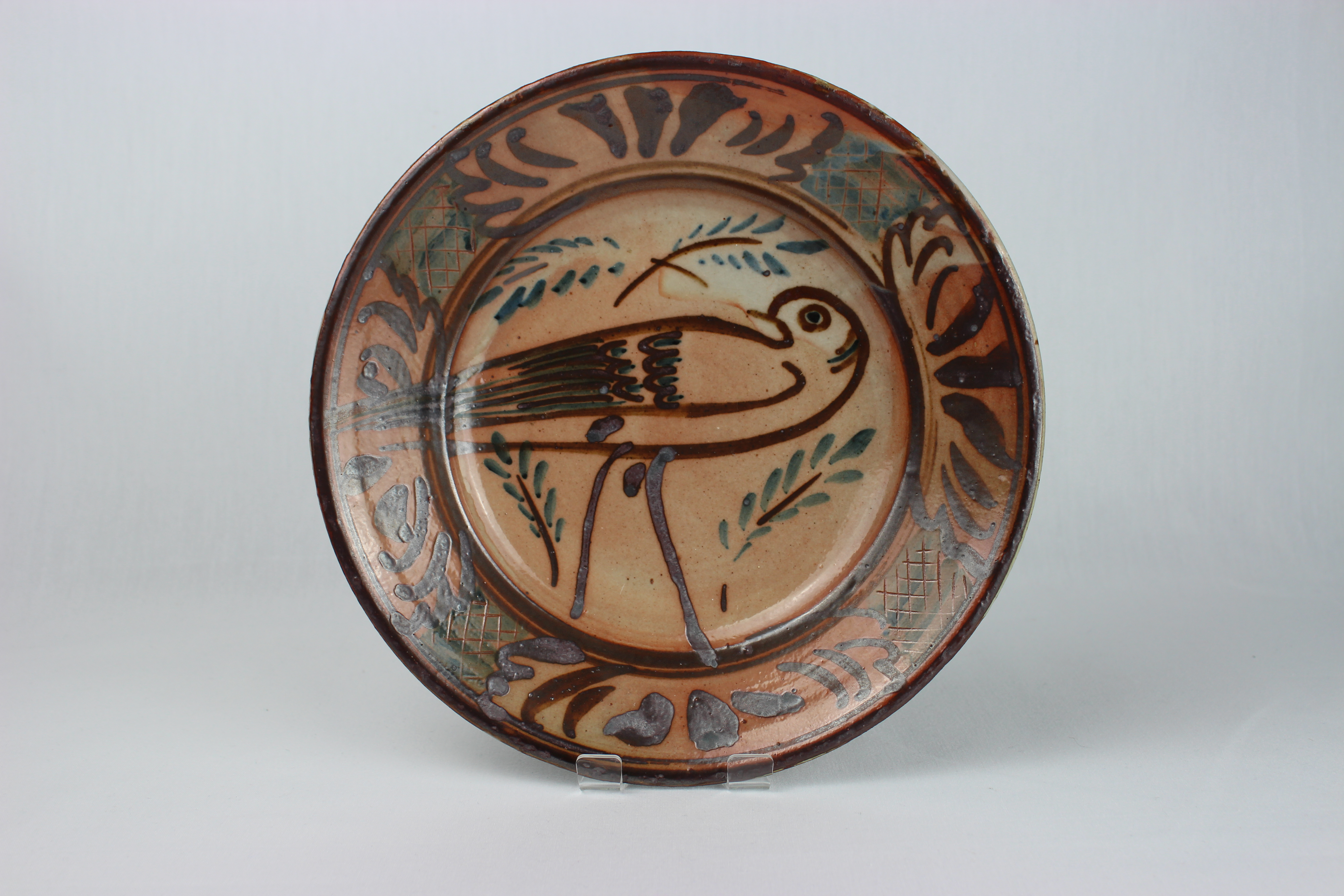
Seth Cardew plate

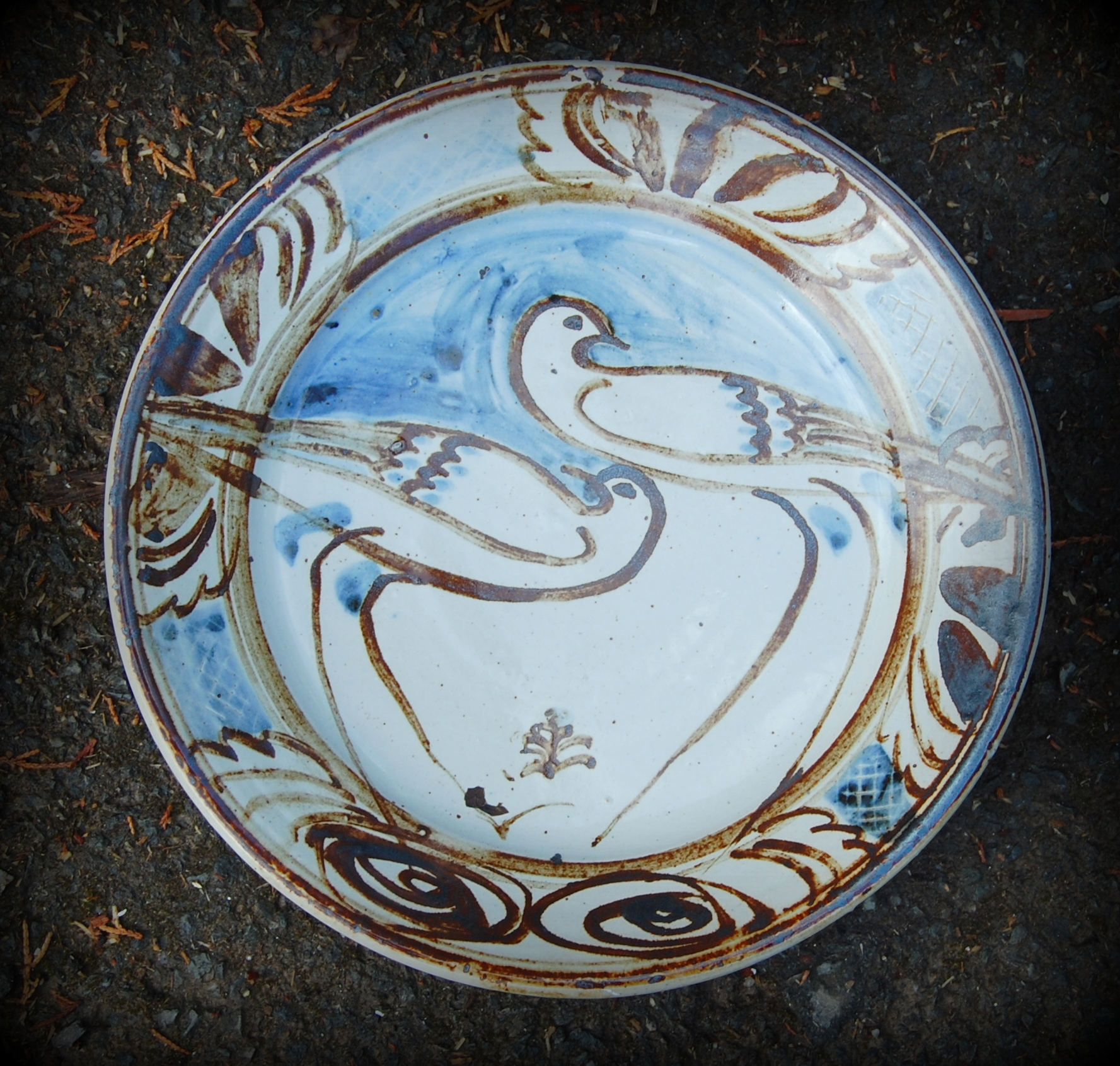
A Blue Seth Cardew Plate

Wenford Bridge Pottery

Seth Cardew (11 November 1934 – 2 February 2016) was an English studio potter. He was the eldest son of fellow potter Michael Cardew and the brother of composer Cornelius Cardew.

Cardew was born in Winchcombe, Gloucestershire. He began his education as a chorister at Canterbury Cathedral Choir School and Midhurst Grammar School, he then studied painting at Chelsea School of Art London and sculpture at Camberwell School of Art.

He then worked as a model maker at Pinewood, Elstree and Sheperton Studios from 1960 to 1970, including work on the 1962 film Satan Never Sleeps and Cleopatra in 1963.

Cardew met his first wife Jutta Zemke whilst studying at Chelsea School of Art and together they had three children, Aeschylus, Ara and Gaea. Seth's son, Ara Cardew, is also a potter who worked at Wenford Bridge from 1981 until 1997 when he relocated to the US. After his father's death in 1983, Seth took over the running of Wenford Bridge Pottery in Cornwall and carried on the tradition of making tableware in stoneware and running "hands on" pottery courses.

Cardew was also an accomplished pianist and played the trumpet with St Breward Silver Band.

Seth's second marriage was to quilt maker Roberta Pejic and they relocated to Masia Albadas, Spain, in 2005. He died in the United States on 2 February 2016.

Cardew's work is exhibited in Birmingham City Art Gallery, the Royal Cornwall Museum, Truro, the V&A and the William Alfred Ismay collection at the York City Art Gallery.

== See also ==
- Studio pottery
