= Elfyn Lewis =

Welsh painter (born 1969)

Elfyn Lewis (born 1969) is a Welsh painter who won the National Eisteddfod of Wales Gold Medal for fine art in 2009 and the Welsh Artist of the Year prize in 2010.

Lewis was born in Porthmadog, Gwynedd and studied at the University of Central Lancashire, Preston, before gaining an MA in Fine Art from the University of Wales Institute, Cardiff in 1998. He lives and works in Grangetown, Cardiff.

Lewis's paintings are held in the collections of the Cynon Valley Museum, MOMA Wales and Gwynedd Museum and Art Gallery.

Elfyn Lewis was elected to the Royal Cambrian Academy, Conwy in 2017
