= Dan Arbeid =

English studio potter

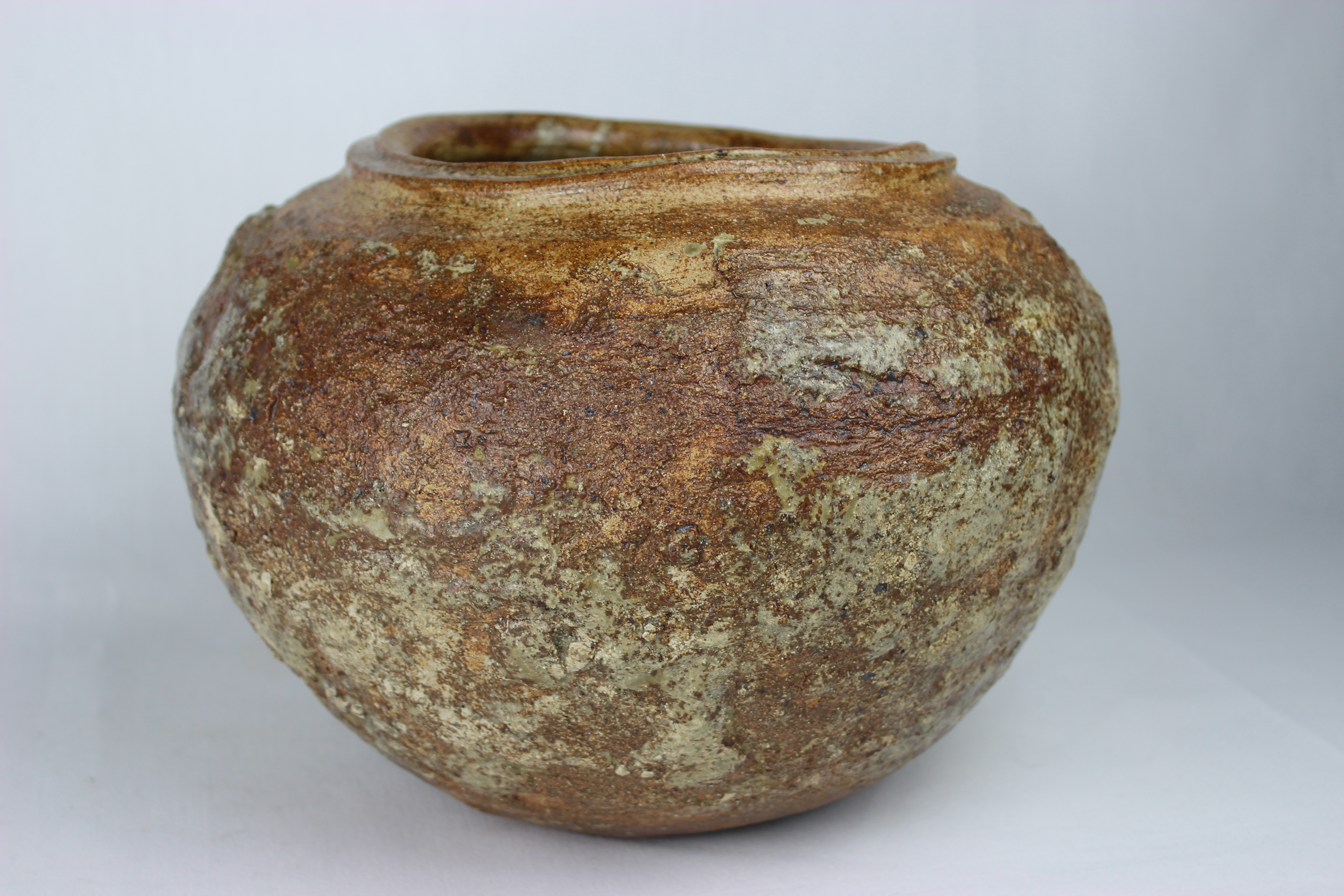
Coiled pot by Dan Arbeid

Dan Arbeid (2 April 1928 - 19 September 2010) was an English studio potter, considered innovative with a radical use of hand-building techniques.

== Early life and education ==
Arbeid was born into a secular Jewish family in Stepney, East London. Having left school in 1942 he worked as a tailor for thirteen years. Looking for a change in direction, Arbeid travelled to Israel where he stayed on a kibbutz before moving to Beersheba to join the Harsa Pottery ceramic art department working with Nehemia Azaz. In 1957 he became a pottery technician at Central School of Art and Design, and later lectured there and at Camberwell College of Arts.

== Career ==
Arbeid was the subject of a film directed by Mike Dibb "Dan Arbeid, Potter" in 1971. His work was exhibited at the Primavera Gallery and is also featured in the William Alfred Ismay collection and the Victoria and Albert Museum.
