= Christine Jones (police officer) =

British police officer

Christine Jones QPM

Lead, ACPO National Mental Health Working Group
- Incumbent
- Assumed office 2012
- Preceded by: Simon Cole

Personal details
- Born: 1964 (age 61–62) or 1965 (age 60–61)
- Profession: Police officer

Commander Christine Jones QPM (born 1964/1965) is a senior British police officer serving with London's Metropolitan Police Service ("the Met"). As of 2014, she is the Met's senior officer responsible for mental health and for domestic violence; she also the leads the Association of Chief Police Officers' (ACPO) National Mental Health Working Group.

== Career ==
In 2008, Jones was in charge of an operation in which Mark Saunders was shot dead by police firearms officers after repeatedly firing a shotgun out of a window; after the inquest into Saunders' death, Jones said "the object of the police was to protect the public and [to] bring Mark Saunders to safety. But we are prepared to take appropriate action to make difficult decisions to protect the public". In April 2011, Jones was responsible for the security operation at the wedding of Prince William and Catherine Middleton.

Jones was appointed to lead the Met on mental health in 2012 upon the retirement of her predecessor. In this role, she has worked to change the way people with mental health problems are treated when they come into contact with the police. Shortly after her appointment, Jones undertook a review of cases involving mental health including deaths in police custody. She concluded that police officers were too often being used for tasks of which they were not trained, such as transporting people detained under the Mental Health Act 1983 to hospital or detention of people in crisis at police stations—a practice she wishes to see become a "never event".

Jones oversaw the implementation of an assessment framework for the Met in 2013 which was intended to assist police officers in recognising mental health issues, which showed that a third of individuals who come to police attention have mental health problems. During Jones' tenure, mental health professionals have been stationed at police custody suites in London, and the Met aims to extend the scheme to all of its custody suites by the end of 2014. Jones has also overseen the retraining of police officers to recognise a mental health crisis as a medical emergency, with the result that the number of mentally ill people taken to police custody (rather than another "place of safety") in the Metropolitan Police area decreased from 86 in 2013 to 27 in the first half of 2014. Jones praised the assistance she received from NHS England in implementing the changes, but was critical of the lack of mental health provision elsewhere in England and Wales, describing it as "wholly inadequate and [...] until recently, non-existent in some areas".

In an interview for The Guardian newspaper, Jones expressed disinterest in becoming commissioner of the Metropolitan Police, stating that she "wouldn't want that sort of personal intrusion. Everything you do is under the spotlight".

== Personal life ==
Jones' sister is a consultant psychiatrist and both her parents worked for the National Health Service (NHS). Her brother also worked for the NHS but died suddenly.

== Honours ==
Jones was awarded the Queen's Police Medal (QPM) in the 2015 Birthday Honours.
