= Iwan Bala =

Welsh artist

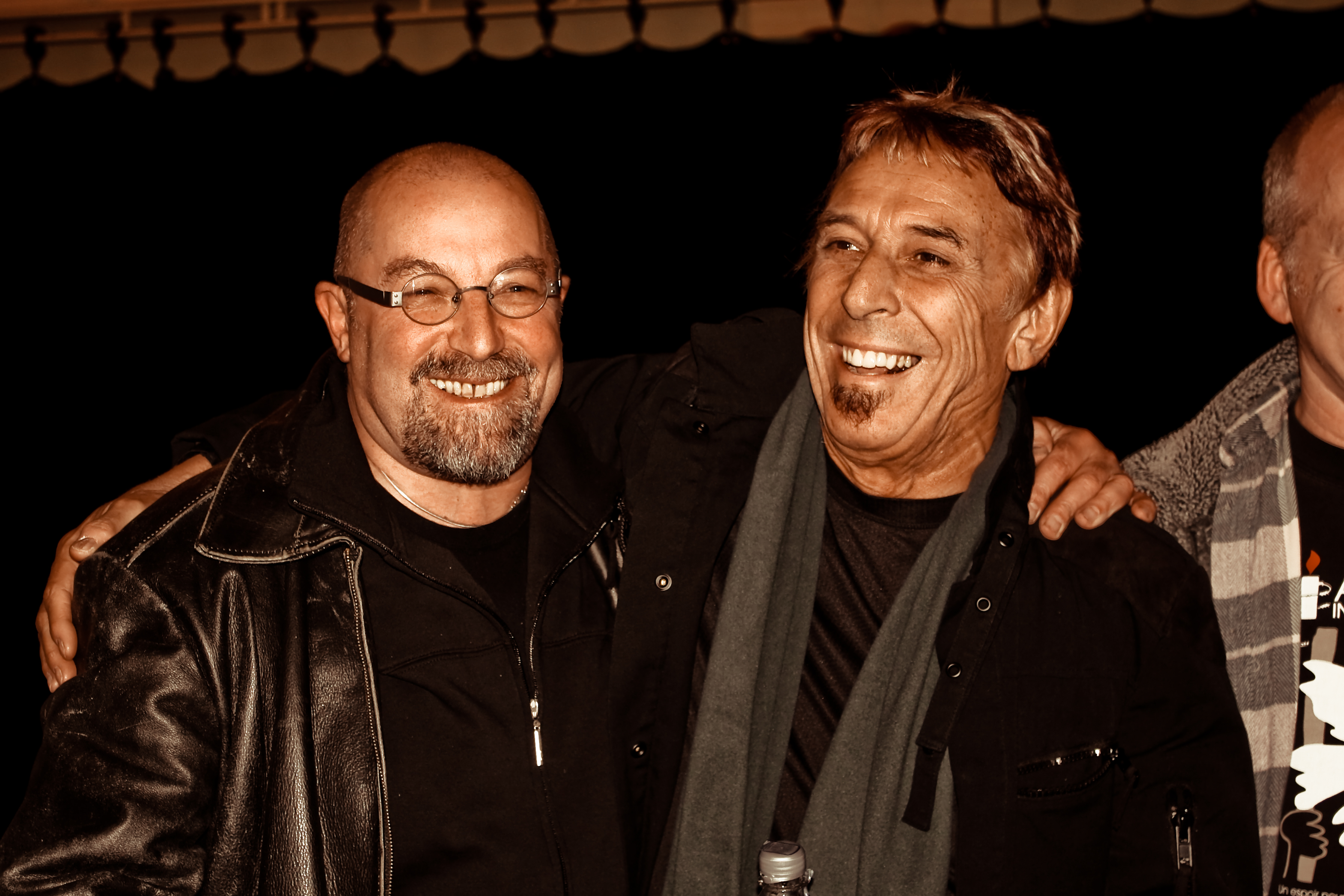
- Iwan Bala (left) with John Cale in Ammanford (2009)
- Born: Richard Iwan Ellis Roberts; May 1956 (age 70); Sarnau, Merionethshire, Wales
- Education: the University of Wales Institute Cardiff; Howard Gardens College of Art, Cardiff; University of Aberystwyth
- Known for: Painting / Drawing / 3D Assemblages / Art Literature
- Awards: Gold Medal in fine art, National Eisteddfod of Wales; Glyndŵr Award.

Iwan Bala (born Richard Iwan Ellis Roberts, May 1956) is a Welsh artist.

== Early life and education ==
Iwan Bala was born Richard Iwan Ellis Roberts in born May 1956 in Sarnau, Merionethshire, near Bala. He was raised in Gwyddelwern, near Corwen, Denbighshire. Bala is Welsh-speaking.

He attended Ysgol y Berwyn comprehensive school in Bala. He studied geography and politics at the University of Aberystwyth from 1974, then from 1975 until 1977 he studied fine art at Cardiff College of Art. He gained an MA in fine art from the University of Wales Institute Cardiff in 1993.

== Career and practice ==
In 1990 Bala became artist-in-residence at the National Gallery of Zimbabwe. In 1993 he presented the S4C arts programme Delweddau Zimbabwe (Welsh for 'Zimbabwe Images').

From 2007 to 2015 Bala was senior lecturer at the School of Creative Arts and Humanities at University of Wales, Trinity Saint David, Carmarthen.

Bala creates his art-work using memorised and imagined maps and landscapes, commenting on Welsh culture.

He is a founder member of The Artists' Project, an international group led by artists that organised art events in New York City, Poland, Spain, Israel, and Wales. He was a member of the Ysbryd/Spirit group of painters, formed by John Uzzell Edwards.

== Recognition and awards ==
Bala has won many prizes, including the Gold Medal in Fine Art at the National Eisteddfod of Wales in 1997 (and a prize winner in 1988, 1989 and 1993). He won the Glyndŵr Award in 1998, "for outstanding contributions to the arts in Wales".

He has also been recipient of grants from the Arts Council of Wales, including a travel grant to visit Zimbabwe in 1990, research funding for "Certain Welsh Artists", a collection of essays published by Seren Books in 1999 and a Career Development Grant (printmaking) 2001. He was also awarded a Wales Art International travel grant to Galicia in 2004 and Brittany in 2007.

== Exhibitions ==
In 2001 and again in 2008, Bala's work was exhibited in the Euro-Celtic Visual Art Exhibition mounted by Wales Arts International, along with fellow Ysbryd / Spirit member, John Uzzell Edwards.

In 2012 Bala collaborated with poet, and fellow lecturer at Trinity Saint David's, Menna Elfyn, for an exhibition called Field-notes.

== Collections ==
Bala's work is held in many public and private collections, including the National Museum Wales (Derek Williams Trust), the Museum of Modern Art Wales, the Imperial War Museum, the Contemporary Art Society for Wales, Newport Museum and Art Gallery, Y Gaer, A Fundacion Casa Museo "A Solaina" de Pilono, Galicia, The University of Glamorgan and The National Library of Wales.

== Publications ==
- Intimate Portraits, 1995 (Seren)
- Welsh Art Goes International, 1996 (Planet)
- Welsh Painters Talking, 1997 (Seren)
- Appropriate Behaviour, 1997 (Planet)
- Darllen Delweddau (Welsh for 'Reading Images')), 2000 (Gwasg Carreg Gwalch)
- Certain Welsh Artists, 1999 (Seren)
- here+now, 2004 (Seren)
- Groundbreaking – The Artist in the Changing Landscape, 2005 (Seren)
- Hon, Ynys y Galon (Welsh for 'This, Island of the Heart')), 2007 (Gwasg Gomer)
