= Craft Potters Association =

British association of potters

The Craft Potters Association (CPA) is an association of potters formed in 1958 in London. It has two wholly owned operating companies: Craftsmen Potters Trading Company Ltd and Ceramic Review Publishing Ltd.

It owns a shop and gallery, the Contemporary Ceramics Centre, London, which exhibits the work of members. There are four categories of membership of the Association: Associate, Selected, Fellow, and Honorary. The CPA currently has over 300 Selected and Fellow members, and over 700 Associate members.

== History ==
Potter Michael Casson was a founder member and served as chair from 1963 to 1966. The current chair is potter Jeremy Nichols. Other notable chairs include David Leach in 1967, Jane Hamlyn, and Phil Rogers from 1994 to 1998.

In 1960, the CPA opened the Craftsmen Potters Shop in Carnaby Street, London. This moved to Marshall Street, London in 1967. The name was later changed to the Contemporary Ceramics: the Craft Potters Shop and Gallery. In 2010 the CPA opened the Contemporary Ceramic Centre in Bloomsbury. The facility houses the offices of the association and Ceramic Review magazine, as well as the gallery and shop, which sells the work of CPA members.

== Ceramic Review magazine ==
Ceramic Review is owned and published by the CPA. The magazine arose out of the newsletter of the Craft Potters Association, and was founded by CPA Council members Emmanuel Cooper and Eileen Lewenstein. Its first issue was published in February 1970, and it continues to be published on a bi-monthly basis. Digital access to its complete archive and to each new issue is available via Exact Editions.

== Craft Pottery Charitable Trust (CPCT) ==
The Craft Pottery Charitable Trust was created in 1991 to support the CPA's educational activities and to administer grants.
