= Christine Jones (artist) =

Welsh artist (born 1955)

Christine Jones (born 1955) is a Welsh artist and ceramicist who won the Gold Medal for art and design at the National Eisteddfod of Wales in 2000.

== Biography ==
Jones was born in Ammanford in south Wales and studied at the West Surrey College of Art and Design from 1980 to 1983. Jones has combined work as a part-time tutor in continuing education for the University of Wales with her artistic career, in which she has created ceramics and pottery, often using a coiling method rather than the more traditional potters wheel. She won a Welsh Arts Council award in 1989 and awards from it successor organisation, the Arts Council of Wales, in both 1998 and 2006. In 2000 she won the Gold Medal for art and design at the National Eisteddfod of Wales held at Llanelli and her work has featured in a number of group exhibitions in Britain and abroad. These included the Clay into Art exhibition at the Metropolitan Museum of Art in New York in 1999 plus shows at the Sainsbury Centre for Visual Arts in 2001 and at the Victoria and Albert Museum in London. The Ruthin Craft Centre in north Wales had solo exhibitions of her work during 2004, 2005 and 2007. Other solo exhibitions included Clay Circles at the Swansea Arts Centre, SAC, in 1985, Form: Coiled and Carved at the Wilson & Gough Gallery in London during 1991 and Still Horizons which was originally at the SAC in 1996 and then toured.

Examples of ceramics by Jones are held by the National Museum of Wales in Cardiff, the Fitzwilliam Museum in Cambridge, the Glynn Vivian Art Gallery in Swansea, York City Art Gallery, the Metropolitan Museum of Art in New York and at the Sainsbury Centre in Norwich.
