= Walter Keeler =

British studio potter

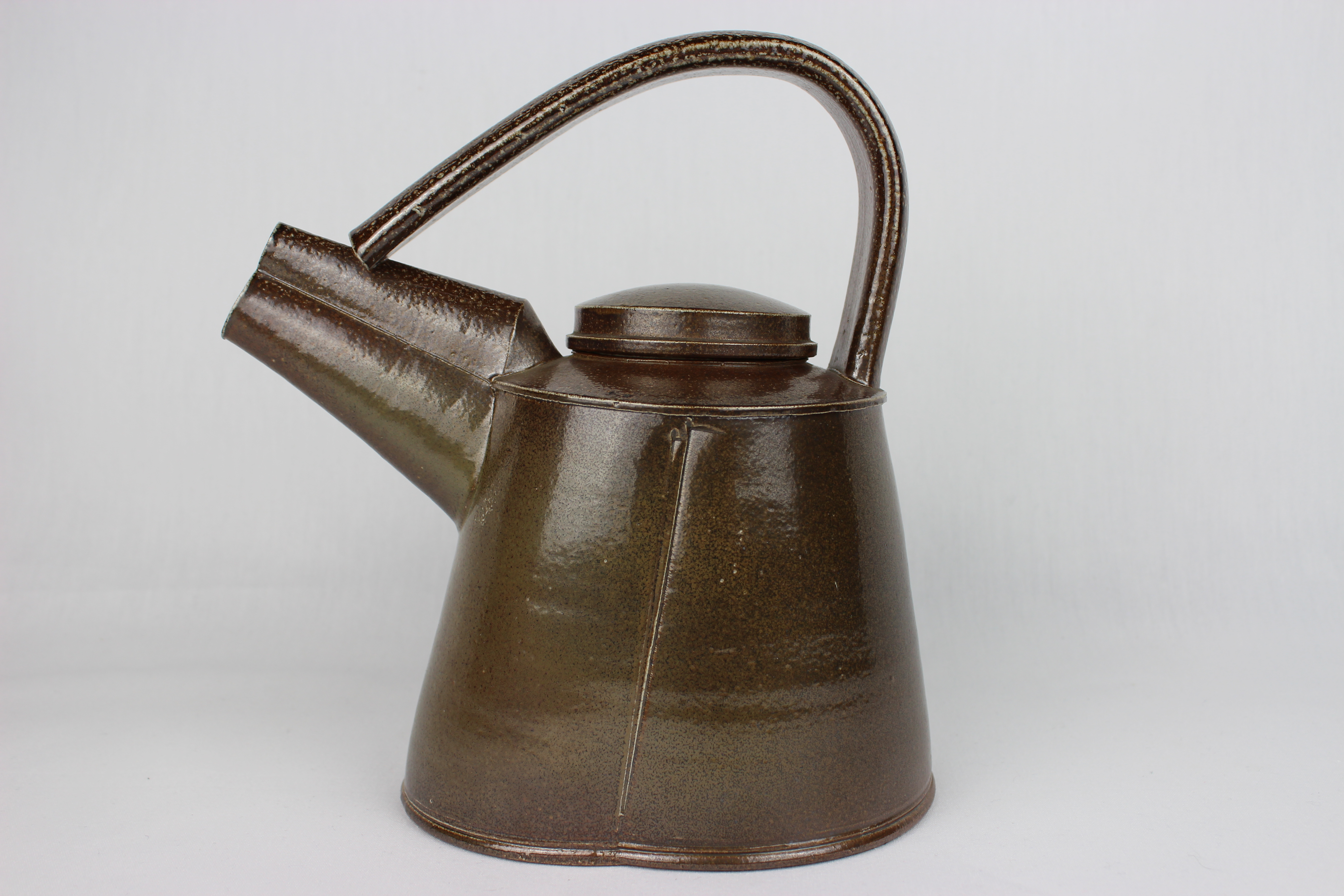
Thrown, altered, salt glazed teapot

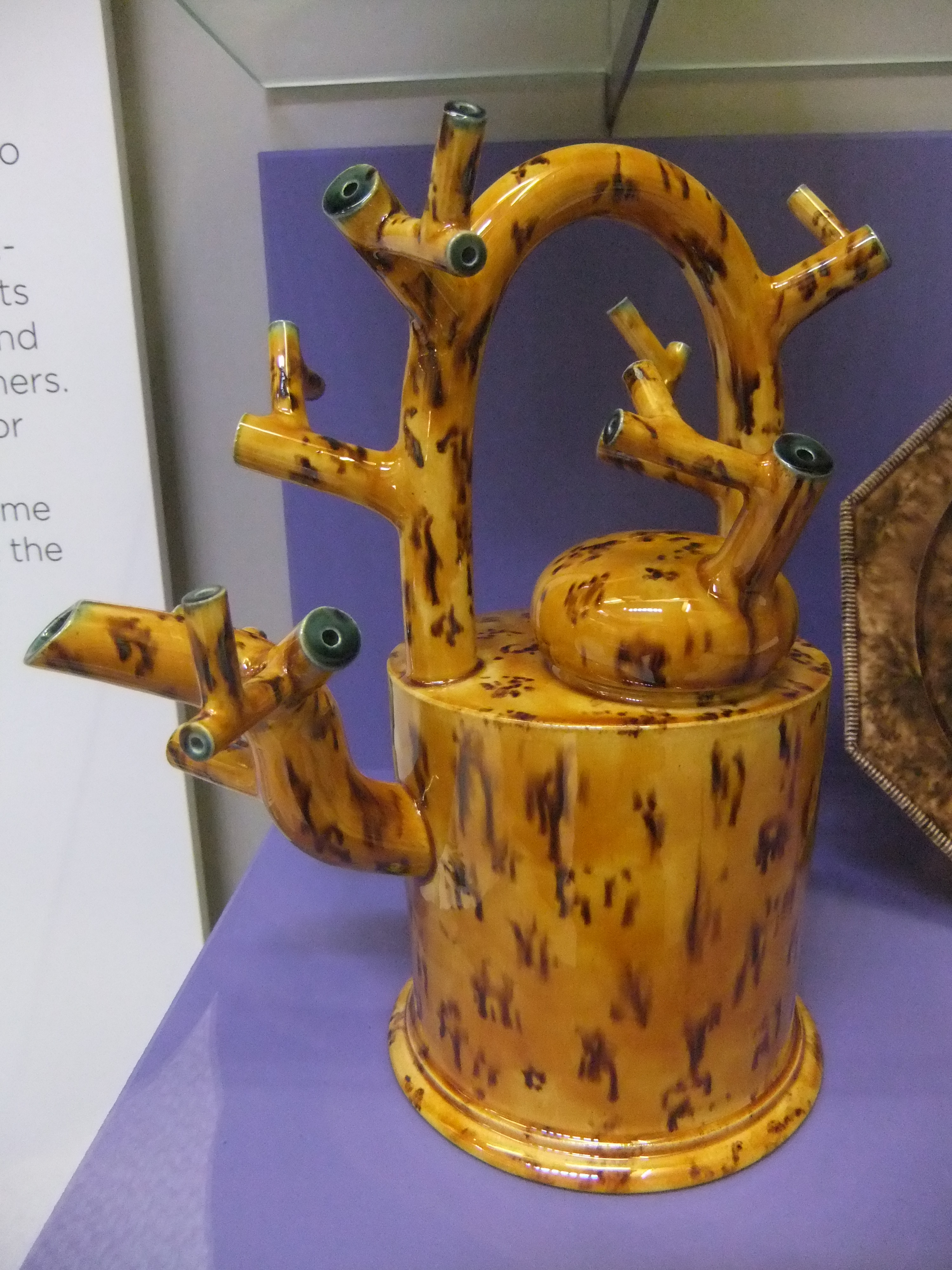
Cut branch teapot (2008), Harris Museum

Walter Keeler (born 1942) is a British studio potter and was professor of Ceramics at the University of the West of England from 1994 to 2002. Keeler makes salt glaze pottery influenced by early Staffordshire Creamware.

Keeler was born in London and attended Harrow School of Art, London from 1958 until 1963 where he was trained by Michael Casson. He established his first pottery at Bledlow Bridge, Buckinghamshire in 1965 and in 1976 he moved his studio to Penallt Wales, where he lives with his wife Madoline. Writer Oliver Watson described him as "one of the most important and influential potters of the 1980's"

Keelers work is held in a number of public collections including Victoria & Albert Museum, National Museum Wales, American Craft Museum, New York, Los Angeles County Museum of Art, Museum of Fine Arts, Houston, USA and the Museum of Modern Art, Tokyo.

Keeler is the president of the South Wales Potters and in 2007 was named Welsh Artist of the Year.
