= Welsh Artist of the Year =

The Welsh Artist of the Year award was an annual art competition in Cardiff's St David's Hall, open to amateur and professional artists with a link to Wales. It ran annually from 2000.

The competition became a significant feature in the Welsh visual arts calendar, possibly due to the prestige associated with the title Welsh Artist of The Year. However the title's relationship with the actual competition structure could be seen as misleading, first because the selection process required the artist to submit an application form and pay an entry fee (therefore only participating artists could be considered). The selection was also limited to one artwork per artist, and that artwork was limited in size, rather than considering an artist's entire contribution for the year, which the title may suggest. A comparison with Cardiff's well-resourced Artes Mundi prize may put the actual stature of Welsh Artist of the Year into perspective.

Prizes were awarded in Painting, Drawing, Sculpture, Photography, and Applied arts categories, as well as a Student prize. An overall winner and runner-up prize were awarded. Winners were chosen by a judging panel composed mainly of fellow artists, with the winner receiving a cheque for £2000.

Following the announcement of the winners in June an exhibition was held at St David's Hall, showing the prizewinners and shortlisted works.

It was announced that the competition would not be held in 2014, as staff would be focusing their efforts on developing the "visual arts in the capital".

== Winners ==
Year	Winners	Runners-up
2014	No competition	
2013	Sarah Ball (painting)	John Abell (printmaking)
2012	Gemma Copp (video)	Aled Rhys Hughes (photography)
2011	Paul Emmanuel (painting on sheep fleece)	Pamela Rawnsley (applied arts)
2010	Elfyn Lewis (painting)	Emily Jenkins (sculpture)
2009	Tim Freeman (printmaking)	Fern Thomas (photography)
2008	Philippa Lawrence (conceptual sculpture/photography)	Eleri Mills (painting)
2007	Walter Keeler (ceramics)	Second prize: Virginia Head (drawing); Third prize: Daphne Hurn (painting)
2006	Ruth Harries (textiles)	Elizabeth Forrest (sculpture)
2005	Sally Moore (painting)	
2003	Brendan Stuart Burns (painting)	Philip Nicol (painting)
2002	Rob Piercy (painting)	Tony Goble (painting)
2000	Brendan Stuart Burns (painting)	Clive Hicks-Jenkins (painting)

== See also ==
- List of European art awards
