= Michael Casson =

English studio potter (1925–2003)

- Born: 2 April 1925; London, England
- Died: 12 December 2003 (aged 78)
- Education: Shoreditch College; Hornsey College of Art
- Known for: Painting

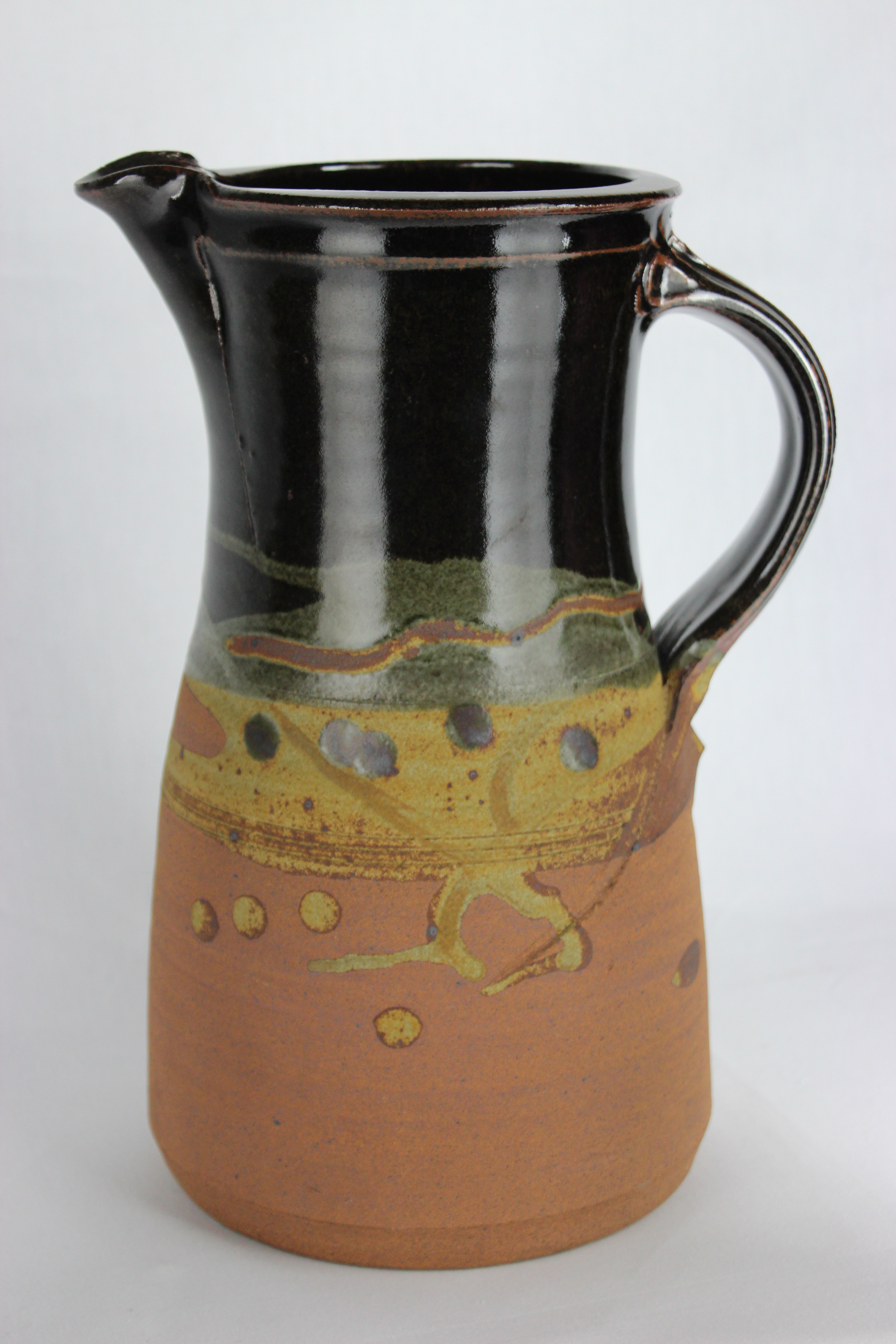
Thrown jug by Michael Casson

Michael Casson OBE (2 April 1925 - 12 December 2003) born in London, was an English studio potter, referred to as "respected and charismatic".

He studied at Tollington Grammar School, art and woodwork at Shoreditch College, and ceramics at Hornsey College of Art, and was one of the founding potters of the Craft Potters Association, a co-operative that acquired a shop and gallery in central London in 1958.

In 1976, Casson devised and presented "The Craft of the Potter" for the BBC a series that involved practical demonstrations and discussion about the craft of the potter. He was known for studio pottery and painting. His work is in the V&A museum London.

== See also ==
- Studio pottery
