= List of Japanese women artists =

This is a list of women artists who were born in Japan or whose artworks are closely associated with that country.

== A ==
- Chako Abeno, manga artist
- Fuku Akino (1908–2001), painter
- Akira Amano (born 1973), manga artist
- Kozue Amano (born 1974), manga artist
- Yasuko Aoike (born 1948), manga artist
- Kotomi Aoki (born 1980), manga artist
- Ume Aoki, manga artist
- Chiho Aoshima (born 1974), pop artist
- Hina Aoyama (born 1970), paper-cutting artist, illustrator
- Kiyoko Arai, manga artist
- Hiromu Arakawa (born 1973), manga artist
- Sakura Asagi, illustrator, manga artist
- Yū Asagiri, manga artist
- George Asakura (born 1974), manga artist
- Hinako Ashihara, manga artist
- Izumi Aso (born 1960), manga artist

== B ==
- Ippongi Bang (born 1965), multimedia and manga artist
- Seiko Kato Behr (1941–2010), Japanese-American potter, ceramicist, ikebana flower artist, installation artist, and sculptor

== C ==
- Toriko Chiya, manga artist
- Junko Chodos (born 1939), mixed media artist, now in the United States
- Nanae Chrono (born 1980), manga artist
- Clamp, manga artists

== E ==
- Eiki Eiki (born 1971), manga artist
- Kinuko Emi (1923–2015), painter
- Nariko Enomoto (born 1967), manga artist

== F ==
- Chie Fueki (born 1973), Japanese-American painter
- Mihona Fujii (born 1974), manga artist
- Kazuko Fujita (born 1957), manga artist
- Cocoa Fujiwara (1983–2015), manga artist
- Hiro Fujiwara (born 1981), manga artist
- Keiko Fukazawa (born 1955), ceramicist and sculptor
- Ikuyo Fujita (birth year unknown), needle felt artist

== H ==
- Moto Hagio (born 1949), manga artist
- Haruko Hasegawa (1895–1967), war painter
- Akiko Hatsu (born 1959), manga artist
- Nanae Haruno, manga artist
- Bisco Hatori (born 1975), manga artist
- Q Hayashida (born 1977), manga artist
- Akiko Higashimura (born 1975), manga artist
- Tatsu Hirota (1904–1990), painter
- Fumiko Hori (1918–2019), Nihonga painter
- Kayoko Hoshino (born 1949), ceramicist

== I ==
- Megumi Igarashi (born 1972), sculptor, manga artist
- Yuki Iiyama (born 1988)
- Ike Gyokuran (1727–1784), painter, calligrapher, poet
- Leiko Ikemura (born 1951), Japanese-Swiss painter, sculptor
- Tari Ito (born 1951), performance artist

== K ==
- Sachiko Kamimura (born 1970), animator and character designer
- Shirley Kaneda (born 1951), artist, educator, writer, based in New York
- Betty Nobue Kano (born 1944), painter, now in the United States
- Tamako Kataoka (1905–2008), Nihonga painter
- Mari Katayama (born 1987), multimedia artist
- Katsushika Ōi (1800–1866), Ukiyo-e artist
- Yuko Takada Keller (born 1958), artist, curator, writer, based in Denmark
- Kitamura Junko (born 1956), ceramist
- Chigusa Kitani (1895–1947), painter and painting teacher
- Kiyohara Tama (1861–1939), painter, based in Italy
- Kiyohara Yukinobu (1643–1682), niece of Kanō Tan'yū, member of the famous Kano School
- Asami Kiyokawa (born 1980), embroidery artist
- Rieko Kodama (born 1963), video game designer, artist
- Nahoko Kojima (born 1981), paper cut artist
- Shigeko Kubota (1937–2015), video artist, sculptor
- Yayoi Kusama (1929–2026), multidisciplinary artist, writer

== M ==
- Toshi Maruki (1912–2000), painter, illustrator, activist
- Keiko Masumoto, contemporary ceramist
- Matsuda Yuriko (born 1943), ceramist
- Fuyuko Matsui (born 1974), Nihonga painter
- Samizu Matsuki (1936–2018), painter, educator
- Mei Matsuoka (born 1981), children's illustrator and author
- Migishi Setsuko (1905–1999), painter and illustrator
- Mitsukazu Mihara (born 1970), illustrator, manga artist and writer
- Keiko Minami (1911–2004), painter, engraver, poet
- Kimiyo Mishima (born 1932), ceramic artist
- Aiko Miyanaga (born 1974), sculptor
- Mokona (born 1968), manga artist
- Junko Mori (born 1974), sculptor
- Mariko Mori (born 1967), contemporary artist

== N ==
- Chiyoko Nakatani (1930-1981), children's picture book illustrator
- Tsubaki Nekoi (born 1969), manga artist
- Minako Nishiyama (born 1965), contemporary artist

== O ==
- Nanase Ohkawa (born 1967), manga artist
- Yoko Ono (born 1933), multimedia artist, singer, peace activist
- Emi Ozawa (born 1962), contemporary artist

== P ==
- Junco Sato Pollack (active since 1970s), textile artist, based in the United States

== S ==
- Shima Seien (1892–1970), nihonga artist
- Yoshiko Shimada (born 1959), video artist, feminist
- Toko Shinoda (1913–2021), painter, calligrapher
- Michiko Suganuma (born 1940), Urushi lacquer artist
- Hiromi Suzuki (dates unknown), visual poetry artist and fiction writer

== T ==
- Tomoko Takahashi (born 1966), installation artist, based in London
- Mitsuba Takanashi (active since late 1990s), manga artist
- Aya Takano (born 1976), manga artist, writer
- Chieko Takamura (1886–1938), oil painter, paper cutter
- Tsuneko Taniuchi, contemporary performance artist
- Atsuko Tanaka (1932–2005), avant-garde artist
- Yoko Tawada (born 1960), writer, now in Germany
- Kea Tawana (c. 1935–2016), sculptor, active in the United States
- Yoko Terauchi (born 1954), sculptor
- Tomiyama Taeko (1921–2021), painter
- Naoko Tosa (born 1961), media artist
- Noriko Tsuiki (born 1952), textile artist, weaver, printmaker, author

== U ==
- Shōen Uemura (1875–1949), painter
- Hana Usui (born 1973), visual artist, now in Europe

== W ==
- Yoshiko Iwamoto Wada (born 1944), textile artist

== Y ==
- Ayano Yamane (born 1977), manga artist
- Yamashita Rin (1857–1939), icon painter
- Hisae Yanase (1943–2019), ceramist
- Yuri Yokomizo, illustrator and graphic designer
