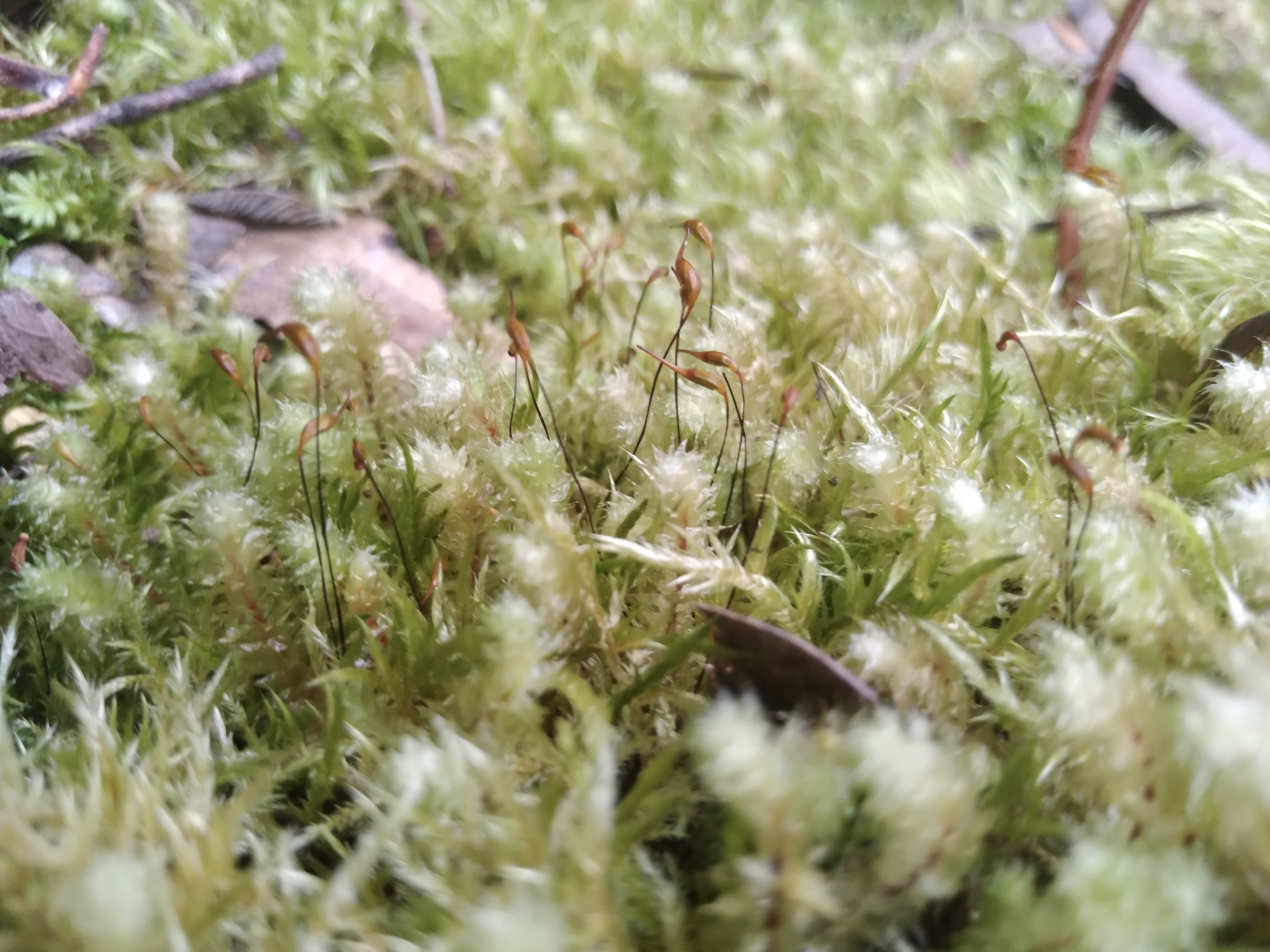
- moss at Mount Imlay, Australia

Scientific classification
- Kingdom: Plantae
- Division: Bryophyta
- Class: Bryopsida
- Subclass: Bryidae
- Order: Ptychomniales
- Family: Ptychomniaceae
- Genus: Ptychomnion
- Species: P. aciculare

Binomial name
- Ptychomnion aciculare (Brid.) Mitt.

Synonyms
- Hypnum aciculare Brid.; Hypnum cucullifolium P.Beauv.; Ptychomnion gracillimum Dixon

= Ptychomnion aciculare =

Species of moss

Ptychomnion aciculare (colloquially known as ‘Pipe-cleaner Moss’) is a species of moss found predominantly in Australia, New Zealand, New Caledonia, Samoa, Juan Fernandez Islands and Chile. It is easily recognised given its similarity, especially when partially dried, to a pipe-cleaner. This name is commonly accepted across Australia and New Zealand. It has been observed growing from between sea level to sub-alpine altitudes (1200m).

This plant may also be recognised as Hypnum cucullifolium or Ptychomnion gracillimum.

== General description and morphology ==
Ptychomnion aciculare (Greek ptychios meaning ‘folded’, mnion meaning ‘moss’) is possibly the most common form of moss found in wet and rain forests around the southern hemisphere. It grows on ground level, particularly on humus soils, on fallen trees and logs, or as an epiphyte in some instances; often forming vast mats. It is easily distinguishable due to its prostrate red stems, with irregular squarrose, rugose leaves ranging from 2 to 3.5mm in length. In this sense, particularly when desiccated, it resembles the pipe-cleaner tool. It is generally bright green when wet, becoming increasingly more yellow-brown as it desiccates. It is typically robust, with stems standing erect at various heights, the stem itself brown and visible for most of its length until the leaf apex. Leaves become increasingly green and closely spaced toward stem apices, with an irregular, but cochleate form. Leaves themselves wider at the base before tapering, maximum 5mm in length.

Plants are dioecious, with an upright sporangium often visible. Female stems bare the perichaetia, or the protective tissues surrounding the developing seta and sex organs.

The seta is often brown, 20-30mm in length, bearing a reddish-brown capsule. Operculum is similar size to capsule, with teethed exostome, and ciliated endostome. Spores 10-15 μm in size. Although within the bryophyte genera, P. aciculare does not have gemmae or paraphyllia.

This species has been observed to have a very wide distribution between Australia and New Zealand in particular.

== Reproduction ==
This moss is unisexual, with males in either full-size, dwarfed or leaf-attached forms. Often males can only be observed with a hand-lens. The reproductive plant is obvious with the presence of the sporophyte. This is typically evidenced by the brown seta standing erect with the capsule attached. It will only brown once it has reached full maturity and is no longer required to perform photosynthesis to sustain its growth.

This structure is protected by a calyptra, which acts like a protective cap while growing. Desiccation will continue until the operculum begins to open. The peristome, the final boundary to the spores, will absorb water during rains, opening to create a cavity in the sporophyte from which the spores can be released. This will the allow the tiny spores (between 10 and 12 um) to be dispersed by wind and rain.

== Genetic similarities ==
P. aciculare is thought to be a more ancient species of moss, especially given that they appear in the Early Pleistocene sediments in Western Tasmania. They are genetically and morphologically similar to the moss Echinodium hispidum. However, E. hispidum does not appear in fossil records this old, suggesting that given the similar genetic and morphological traits, as well as the local distribution, that this may be a new species that has arisen from the evolution of P. aciculare

== Uses ==
There are no known uses for this moss, aside from floral decorations. It should be known that there are a number of uses for mosses aside from this, however, such as for fertilisers, biofuels and some medicinal and production uses.

== Unusual specimens ==
While common, P. aciculare is often most predominant in southern beech forest. It can also grow in varying sizes, from being dwarfed at 20mm, while also growing up to 120mm. This makes it quite a large bryophyte species, which is uncommon given their lack of lignified tissues and internal hydraulic systems.

== Threats ==
This species is specialised to growing in rainforest and intermediate wet forests. As such, it is not very fire tolerant, and is only a late-successional plant. This means that it is not seen often in environments outside of those previously mentioned in this article, with the exception of some damp grasslands.

There are no known conservation threats to this species, as it does not provide a primary food source as known. Furthermore, it is a very common species with wide and dense distribution patterns. It has no other known threats, such as predation and other pests.
