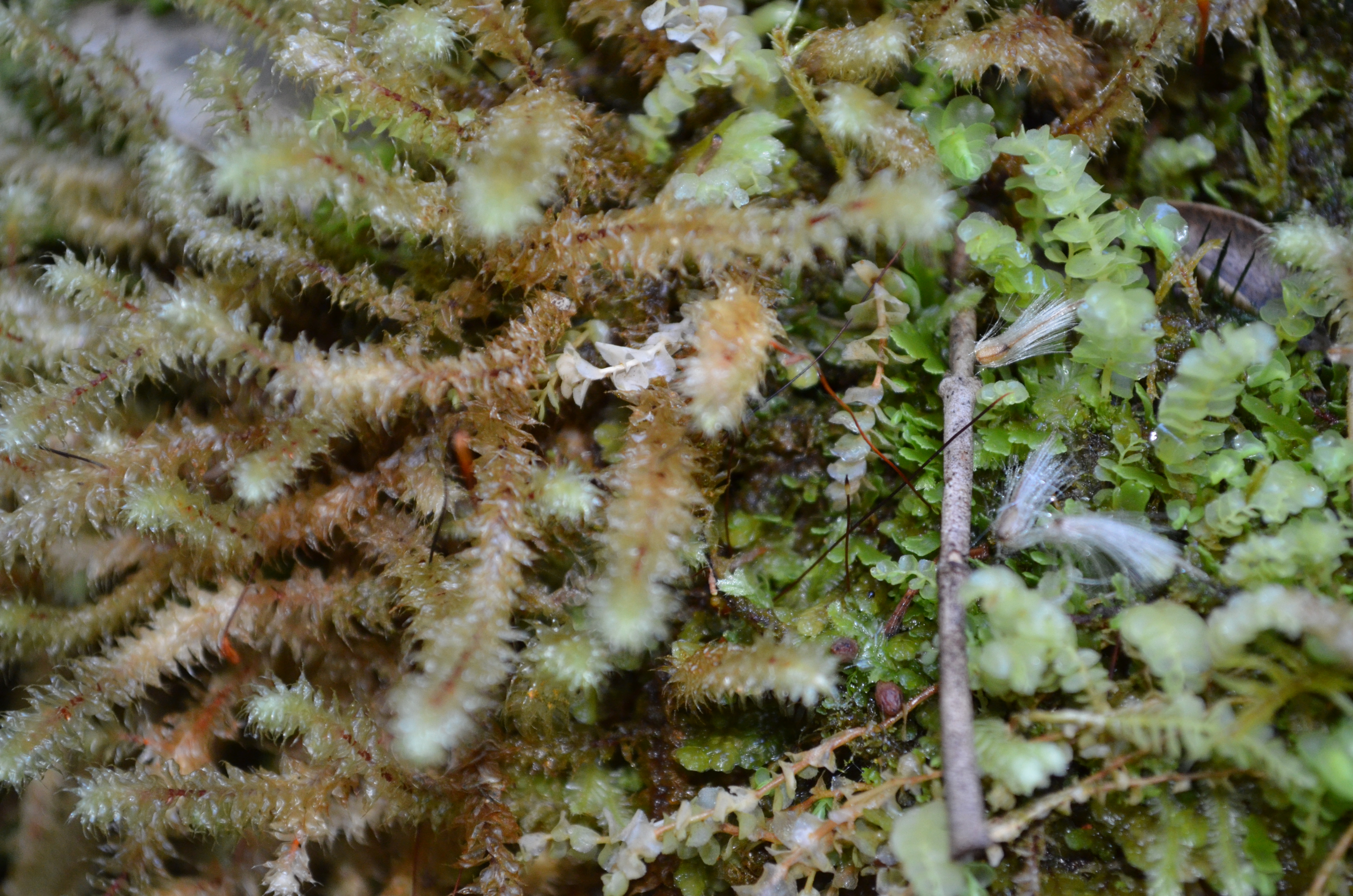
- Ptychomnion aciculare

Scientific classification
- Kingdom: Plantae
- Division: Bryophyta
- Class: Bryopsida
- Subclass: Bryidae
- Order: Ptychomniales
- Family: Ptychomniaceae
- Genus: Ptychomnion (Hook. & Wilson) Mitt.

= Ptychomnion =

Genus of mosses

Ptychomnion is a genus of mosses belonging to the family Ptychomniaceae.

The species of this genus are found in Australia and South America.

Species:

- Ptychomnion aciculare Mitten, 1869
- Ptychomnion cygnisetum Kindberg, 1888
