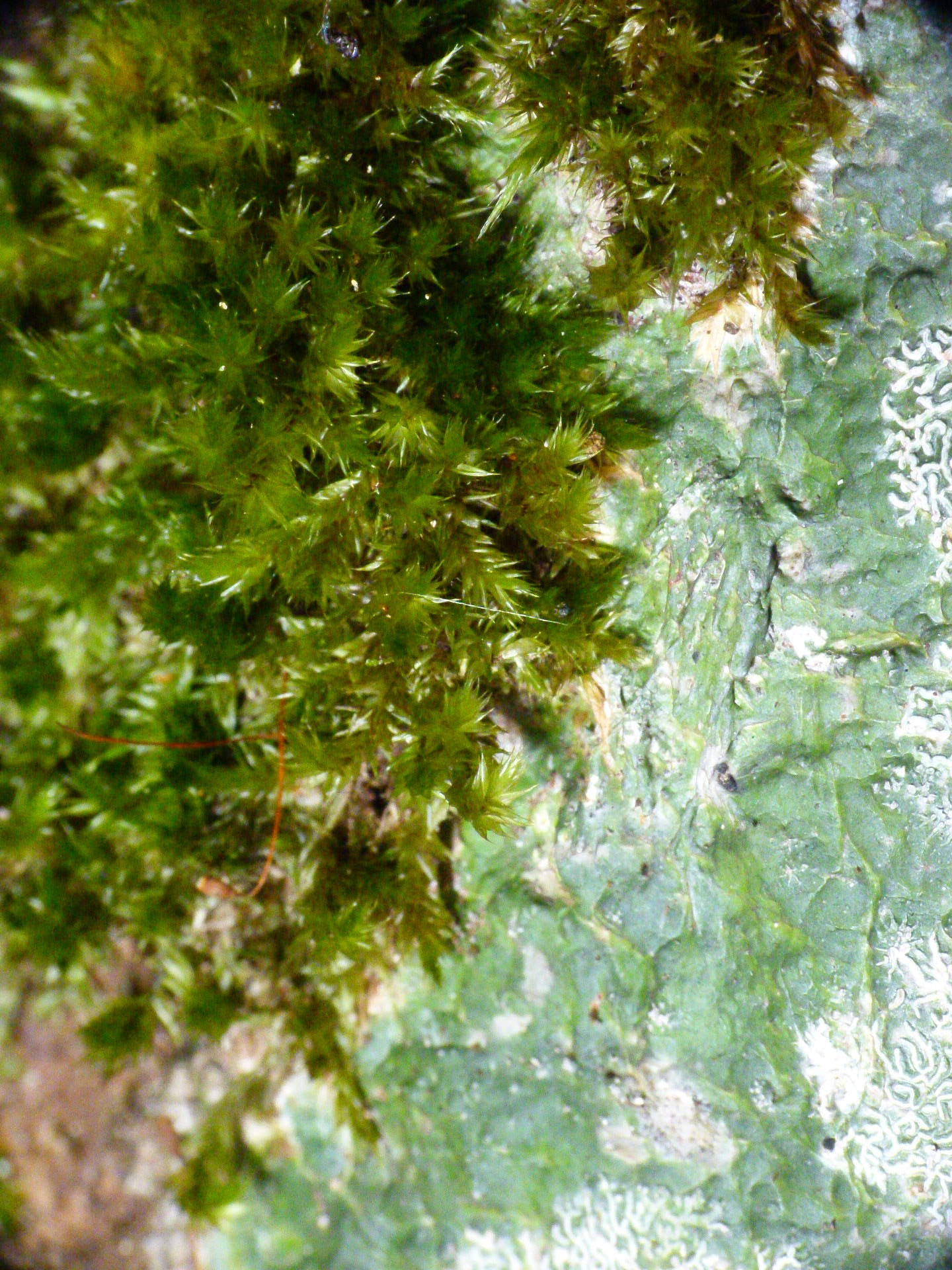
- Spread of Garovaglia sp. controlled by a crustaceous lichen in Wynaad, India, 2016

Scientific classification
- Kingdom: Plantae
- Division: Bryophyta
- Class: Bryopsida
- Subclass: Bryidae
- Order: Ptychomniales
- Family: Ptychomniaceae
- Genus: Garovaglia; Endlicher, 1836

Species
- See text

Synonyms
- Several, including: Carovaglia Endl.

= Garovaglia =

Genus of mosses

Garovaglia is a genus of mosses in the family Ptychomniaceae.

The genus name of Garovaglia is in honour of Santo Garovaglio (1805 - 1882), who was an Italian botanist (Mycology and Bryology), Professor of Natural History at the University of Pavia.

The genus was circumscribed by Vittore Benedetto Antonio Trevisan de Saint-Léon in Caratt. Tre Nuov. Gen. Collem. Vol.1 in 1853, then in Biblioth. Lichenol. Vol.107 on page 41 in 2012 (Secondary Literature).

== Species ==
Garovaglia angustifolia - Garovaglia aristata - Garovaglia baeuerlenii - Garovaglia binsteadii - Garovaglia brassii - Garovaglia compressa - Garovaglia crispa - Garovaglia crispata - Garovaglia eberhardtii - Garovaglia elegans - Garovaglia luzonensis - Garovaglia mujuensis - Garovaglia plicata (type) - Garovaglia plumosa - Garovaglia powellii - Garovaglia robbinsii - Garovaglia subelegans - Garovaglia tortifolia - Garovaglia zantenii
