= Felt =

Textile made from condensed fibers

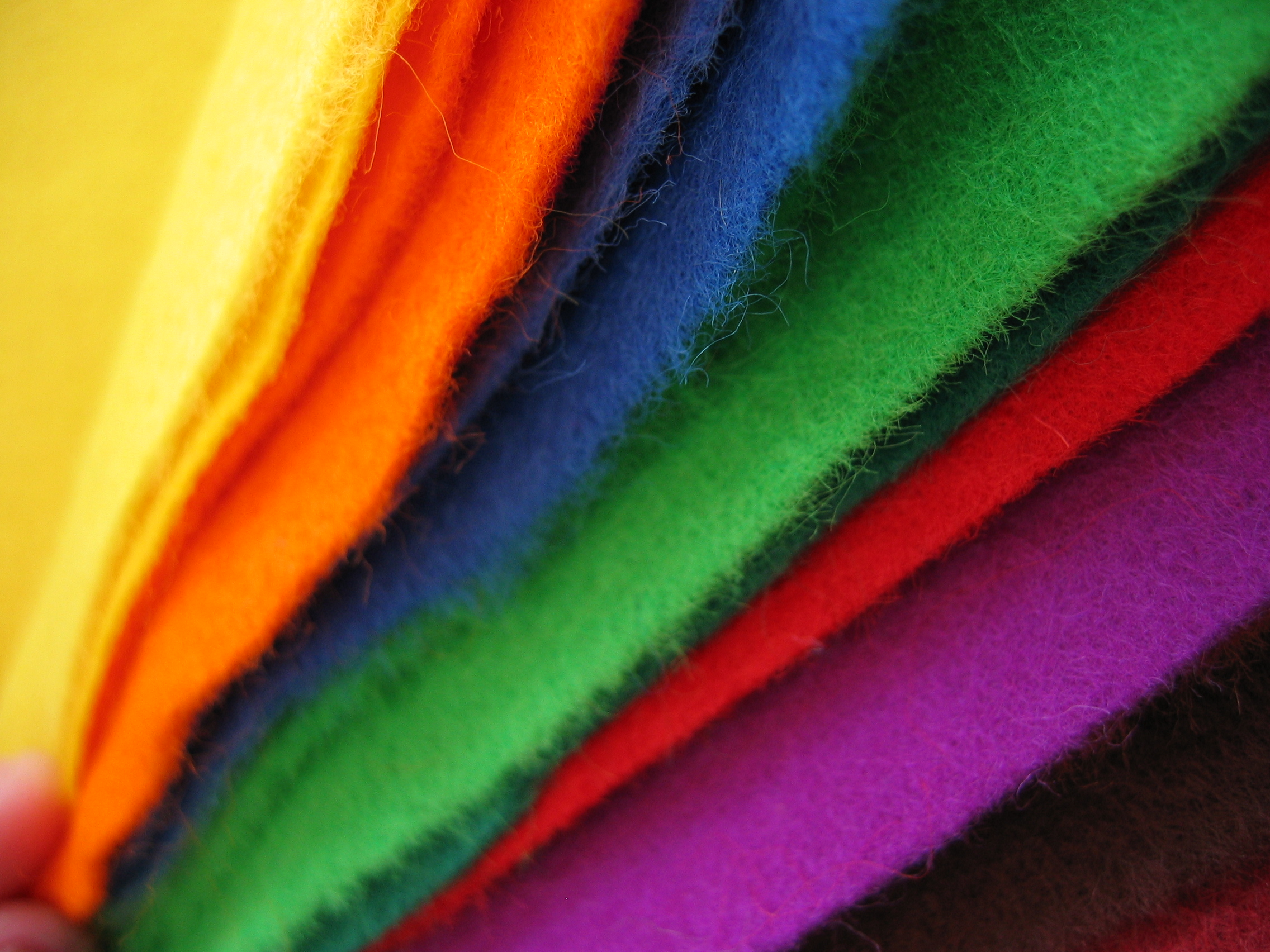
Samples of felt in different colors

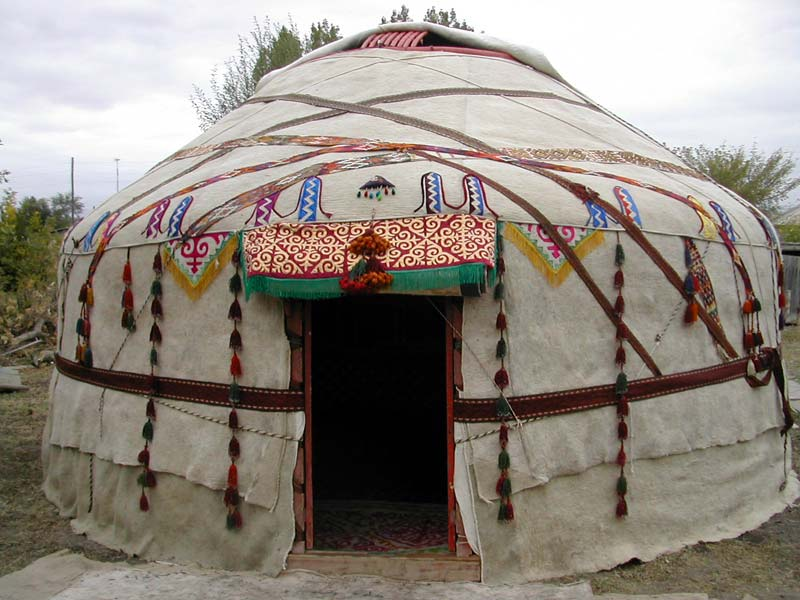
Kazakh felt yurt

Felt is a textile that is produced by matting, condensing, and pressing fibers together. Felt can be made of natural fibers such as wool or animal fur, or from synthetic fibers such as petroleum-based acrylic or acrylonitrile or wood pulp–based rayon. Blended fibers are also common. Natural fiber felt has special properties that allow it to be used for a wide variety of purposes. It is "fire-retardant and self-extinguishing; it dampens vibration and absorbs sound; and it can hold large amounts of fluid without feeling wet..."

== History ==
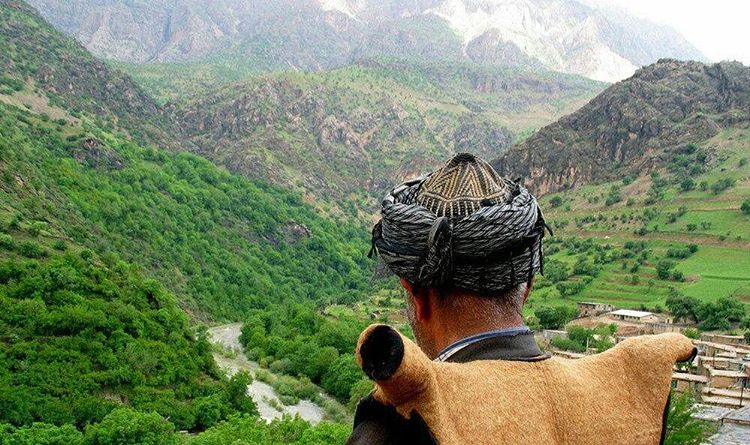
Faranji is a Kurdish vest that is worn by men in winter and early spring.

Felt from wool is one of the oldest known textiles. Excavations at Çatal Hüyük in Anatolia have revealed possible evidence of felting about 6000 BCE; more definitely, felt hats found in the Mongolian Autonomous Region of China date to c. 1800 BCE.

Many cultures have legends about the origin of felt-making. The story of Saint Clement and Saint Christopher states that the men packed their sandals with wool to prevent blisters while fleeing from persecution. At the end of their journey, the movement and sweat had turned the wool into felt socks.

Most likely, the origin of felt was in east Asia, where there is evidence of feltmaking in Siberia (Altai mountains) in Northern Mongolia, and there is more recent evidence that dates back to the first century CE in Mongolia. Siberian tombs (7th to 2nd century BCE) show the broad uses of felt in that culture, including clothing, jewelry, wall-hangings, and elaborate horse blankets. Employing careful color use, stitching, and other techniques, these feltmakers were able to use felt as an illustrative and decorative medium upon which they could depict abstract designs and realistic scenes. Over time, these makers became known for the abstract patterns they used, which were derived from plant, animal, and other symbolic designs.

From Siberia and Mongolia, feltmaking spread across the areas that were held by the Turkic-Mongolian tribes. Sheep and camel herds were central to the wealth and lifestyle of these tribes, both of which animals were critical to producing the fibers that were needed for felting. For nomads who travelled frequently and lived on fairly treeless plains, felt provided housing (yurts, tents, etc.), insulation, floor-coverings, and inside walling, as well as many household necessities from bedding and coverings to clothing. In the case of nomadic peoples, felt was particularly noticeable in trappings for their animals and for travel. Felt was often used for blankets that went under saddles.

Dyes provided rich coloring, and colored slices of pre-felts (semi-felted sheets that could be cut in decorative ways) along with dyed yarns and threads were combined to create designs on the wool backgrounds. Felt has also been used to create totems and amulets that had protective functions. In traditional societies, the patterns embedded in the felt were also imbued with significant religious and symbolic meaning.

Feltmaking is still practised by nomadic peoples, such as Mongols and Turkic people in Central Asia, where rugs, tents, and clothing are regularly made. Some of these are traditional items, such as the classic yurt, or ger, while others are designed for the tourist market, such as decorated slippers. In the Western world, felt is widely used as a medium for expression in both textile art and contemporary art and design, where it has significance as an ecologically responsible textile and building material.

In addition to Central Asian traditions of felting, Scandinavian countries have also supported feltmaking, particularly for clothing.

== Manufacturing methods ==
=== Wet felting ===
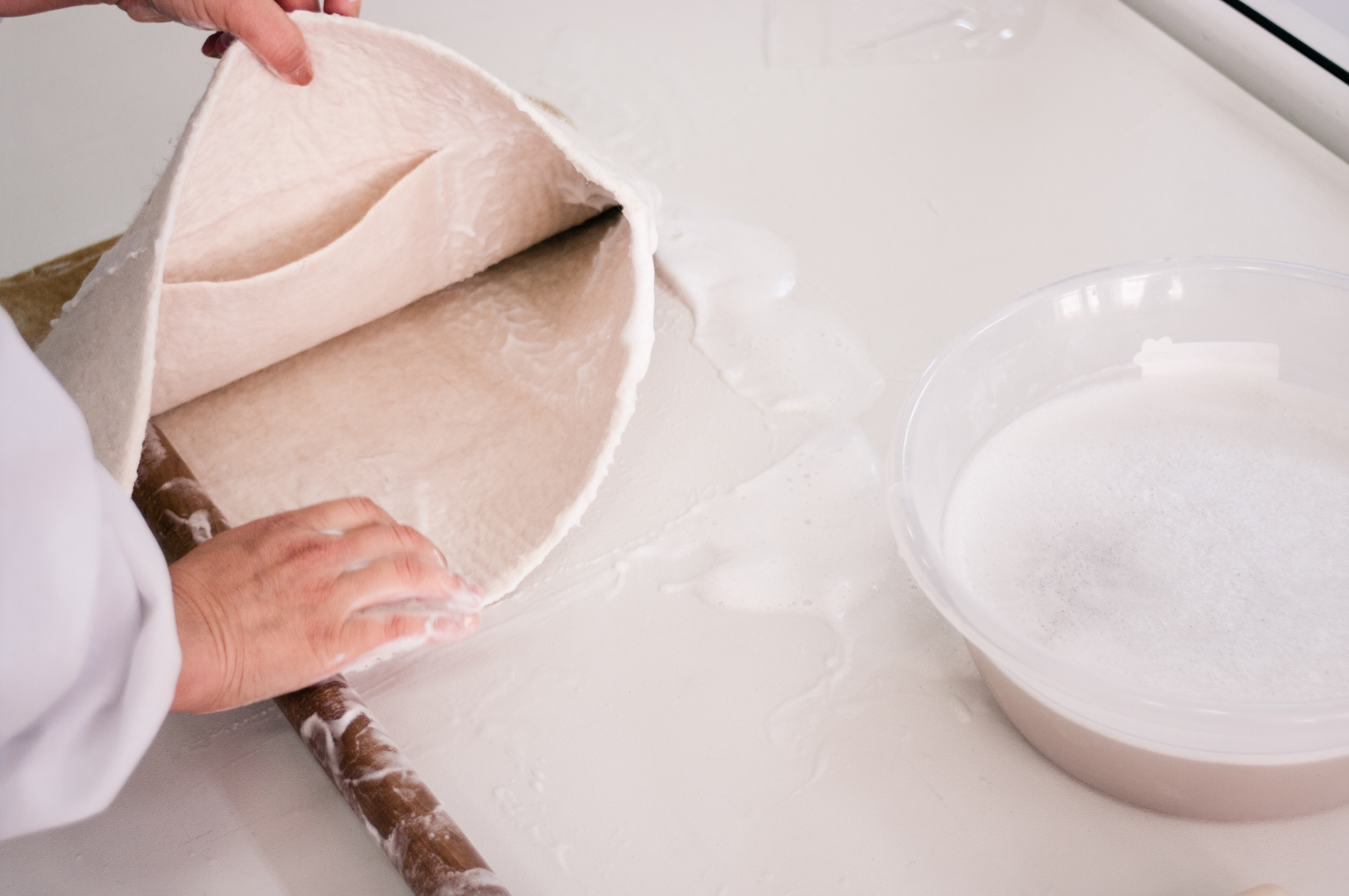
Wooden rolling pin used during the wet felting process

In the wet felting process, hot water is applied to layers of animal hairs, while repeated agitation and compression causes the fibers to hook together or weave together into a single piece of fabric. Wrapping the properly arranged fiber in a sturdy, textured material, such as a bamboo mat or burlap, will speed up the felting process. The felted material may be finished by fulling.

Only certain types of fiber can be wet felted successfully. Most types of fleece, such as those taken from the alpaca or the Merino sheep, can be put through the wet felting process. One may also use mohair (goat), angora (rabbit), or hair from rodents such as beavers and muskrats. These types of fiber are covered in tiny scales, similar to the scales found on a strand of human hair. Heat, motion, and moisture of the fleece causes the scales to open, while agitating them causes them to latch onto each other, creating felt. Plant fibers and synthetic fibers will not wet felt.

In order to make multi-colored designs, felters conduct a two-step process in which they create pre-felts of specialized colors—these semi-completed sheets of colored felt can then be cut with a sharp implement (knife or scissors) and the distinctive colors placed next to each other as in making a mosaic. The felting process is then resumed and the edges of the fabric attach to each other as the felting process is completed. Shyrdak carpets (Turkmenistan) use a form of this method wherein two pieces of contrasting color are cut out with the same pattern, the cut-outs are then switched, fitting one into the other, which makes a sharply defined and colorful patterned piece. In order to strengthen the joints of a mosaic style felt, feltmakers often add a backing layer of fleece that is felted along with the other components. Feltmakers can differ in their orientation to this added layer—where some will lay it on top of the design before felting and others will place the design on top of the strengthening layer.

The process of felting was adapted to the lifestyles of the different cultures in which it flourished. In Central Asia, it is common to conduct the rolling/friction process with the aid of a horse, donkey, or camel, which will pull the rolled felt until the process is complete. Alternately, a group of people in a line might roll the felt along, kicking it regularly with their feet. Further fulling can include throwing or slamming and working the edges with careful rolling. In Turkey, some baths had areas dedicated to feltmaking, making use of the steam and hot water that were already present for bathing.

In Turkey, craft guilds called "ahi" came into being, and these groups were responsible for registering members and protecting the knowledge of felting. In Istanbul at one time, there were 1,000 felters working in 400 workshops registered in this ahi.

=== Needle felting ===
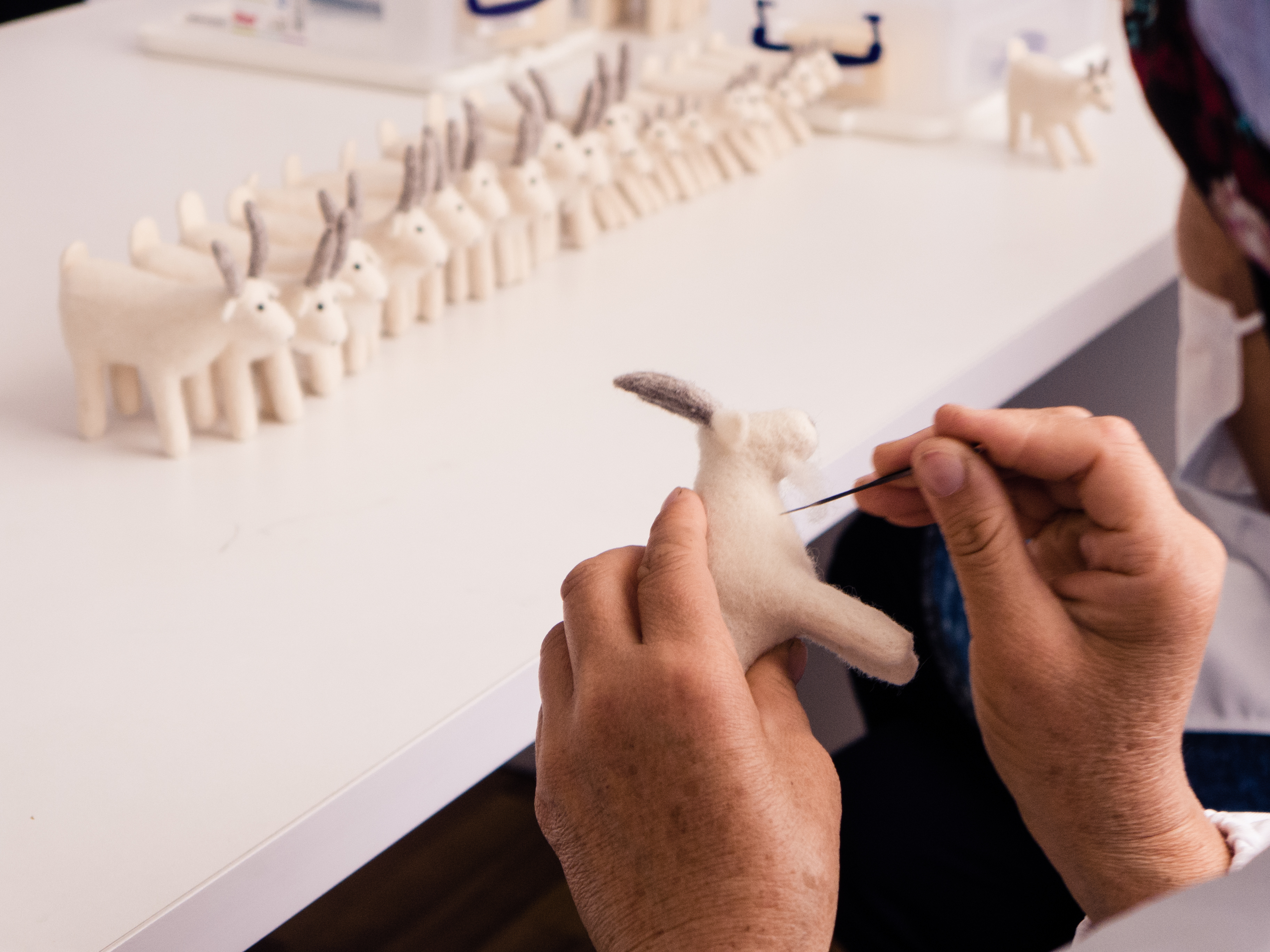
Needle felting process to create small animal figurines

Rather than using water as a medium for linking and aggregating felt fibers, needle felting employs specially designed needles. These have angled notches along the shaft that catch fibers and tangle them together to produce felt. These indented notches are sometimes called "barbs", but barbs are protrusions and would be too difficult to thrust into the wool and nearly impossible to pull out without bringing fibers with them. Felting needles are thin and sharp, with shafts of a variety of different gauges and shapes. Needle felting is used in industrial felt making as well as for individual art and craft applications.

Felting needles are sometimes fitted in holders that allow the use of 2 or more needles at one time to sculpt wool objects and shapes. Individual needles are often used for detail while multiple needles that are paired together are used for larger areas or to form the base of the project. At any point in time a variety of fibers and fiber colors may be added, using needles to incorporate them into the project.

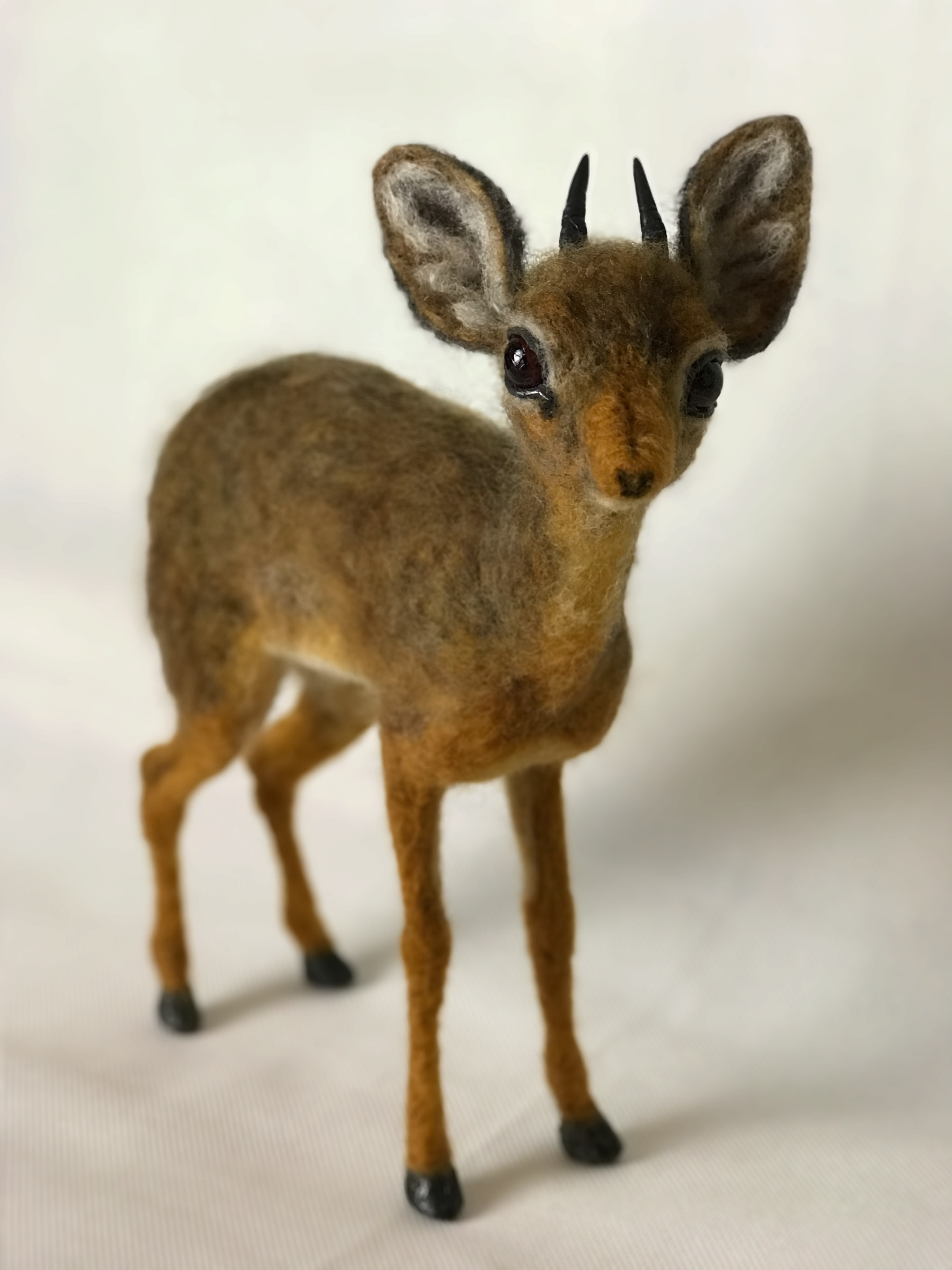
Needle-felted dik-dik

Needle felting can be used to create both two and three dimensional artwork, including soft sculpture, dolls, figurines, jewellery, and two dimensional wool paintings. Needle felting is popular with artists and craftspeople worldwide. One example is Ikuyo Fujita (藤田育代 Fujita Ikuyo), a Japanese artist who works primarily in needle felt painting and mogol (pipe cleaner) art.

Recently, needle felting machines have become popular for art or craft felters. Similar to a sewing machine, these tools have several needles that punch fibers together. These machines can be used to create felted products more efficiently. The embellishment machine allows the user to create unique combinations of fibers and designs.

=== Carroting ===
Invented in the mid-17th century and used until the mid-20th centuries, the "carroting" process was used in the manufacture of good quality felt for making men's hats. Beaver, rabbit or hare skins were treated with a dilute solution of the mercury compound mercuric nitrate. The skins were dried in an oven where the thin fur at the sides turned orange, the color of carrots. Pelts were stretched over a bar in a cutting machine, and the skin was sliced off in thin shreds, with the fleece coming away entirely. The fur was blown onto a cone-shaped colander and then treated with hot water to consolidate it. This cone of felt was then peeled off and passed through wet rollers, causing the fur to felt. These 'hoods' were then dyed and blocked to make hats. The toxic solutions from the carrot and the vapours it produced resulted in widespread cases of mercury poisoning among hatters. This is the origin of the phrase "mad as a hatter", which was used to humorous effect by Lewis Carroll in the chapter "A Mad Tea Party" of the novel Alice in Wonderland.

== Development of felting as a profession ==
As felting grew in importance to a society, so did the knowledge about its techniques and approaches. Amateur or community felting continued in many communities at the same time that felting specialists and felting centers began to develop. The importance of felting to community life can be seen in many Central Asian communities, where felt production is directed by a leader who oversees the process as a ritual that includes prayers—words and actions to bring good luck to the process. Successfully completing the creation of felt (certainly large felt pieces) is reason for celebration, feasting, and the sharing of traditional stories.

== Uses ==
Felt has modern applications in textiles and footwear, and is used in the automotive industry as acoustic liners and anti-vibration components for NVH control, on gaming tables in casinos (a feltlike woven wool cloth often called Baize), in musical instruments (wool felt on piano hammers), and in home construction as roofing felt underlayment. In papermaking, press felts support and dewater the wet web; their imprint historically produced a "felt side" of the sheet, and many fine papers emulate this texture as "felt-marked" or "felt finish" stocks. Felt paper is commonly used for presentation folders, invitations and annual report covers.

=== Industrial uses ===
Felt is frequently used in industry as a sound or vibration damper, as a non-woven fabric for air filtration, and in machinery for cushioning and padding moving parts.

=== Firearms ===
Felt is used in gun wadding, either inside cartridges or pushed down the barrel of a muzzleloader.

=== Home decor ===
Felt can be used in home furnishings like table runners, placemats, coasters, and as backing for area rugs.

=== Clothing ===
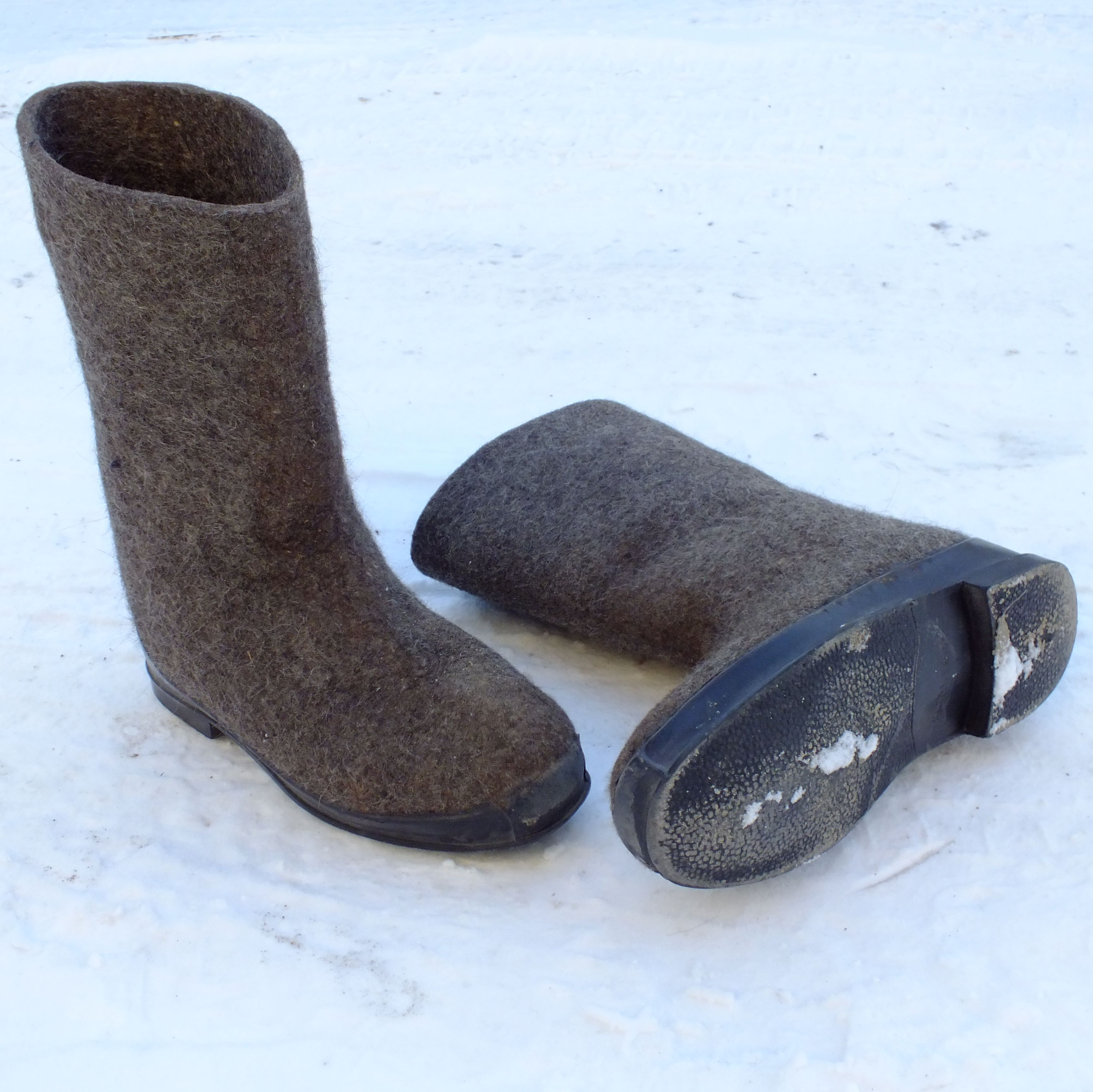
Russian valenki with attached waterproof sole

During the 18th and 19th centuries gentlemen's headwear made from beaver felt were popular. In the early part of the 20th century, cloth felt hats, such as fedoras, trilbies and homburgs, were worn by many men in the western world. Felt is often used in footwear as boot liners, with the Russian valenki being an example.

=== Musical instruments ===
Many musical instruments use felt, often as a damper. On drum cymbal stands, it prevents metal-on-metal contact between the stand, fastener, and cymbal, protecting the cymbal from cracking and ensures a clean sound. It is used to wrap bass drum strikers and timpani mallets. Felt is used extensively in pianos, wrapping the striking face of wooden hammers. The density and springiness of the felt contributes heavily to a piano's tone. As the felt becomes grooved and "packed" with use and age, the tone suffers. Felt under the keys of an accordion controls touch and key noise; it is also used on the pallets to silence notes not sounded by preventing air flow. Felt is used with other instruments, particularly stringed instruments, as a damper to reduce volume or eliminate unwanted vibrations and sounds.

=== Arts and crafts ===
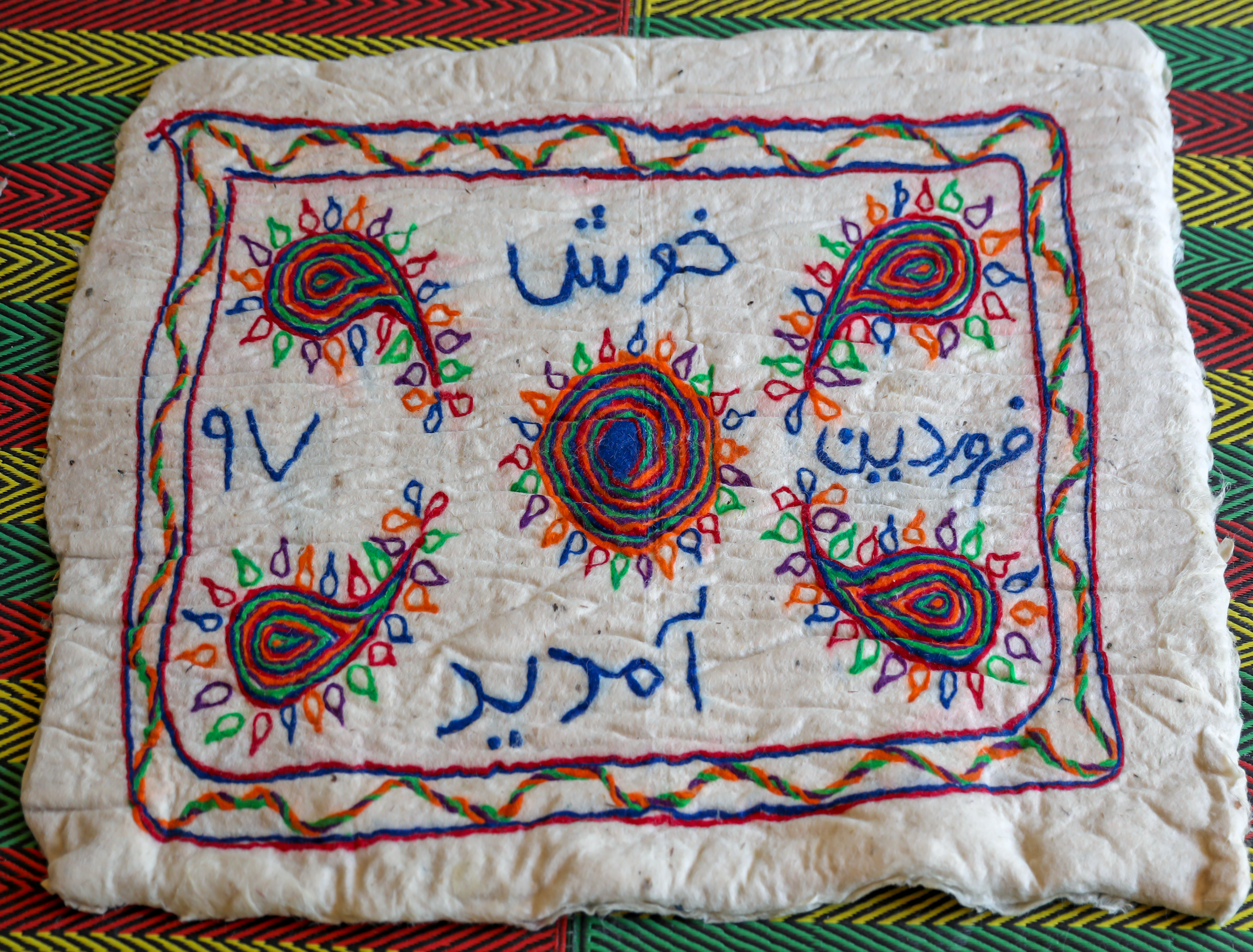
Felt in Maymand, Kerman Province, Iran

Felt is used for framing paintings. It is laid between the slip mount and picture as a protective measure to avoid damage from rubbing to the edge of the painting. This is commonly found as a preventive measure on paintings which have already been restored or professionally framed. It is widely used to protect paintings executed on various surfaces including canvas, wood panel and copper plate.

A felt-covered board can be used in storytelling to small children. Small felt cutouts will adhere to a felt board, and a storyteller can illustrate their story by moving these around the board. Puppets can also be made with felt, with a well-known example being the Muppets. Felt pressed dolls, such as Lenci dolls, were very popular in the nineteenth century and just after World War I.

As part of the overall renewal of interest in textile and fiber arts, beginning in the 1970s and continuing through today, felt has experienced a strong revival in interest, including its historical roots. Polly Stirling, a fiber artist from New South Wales, Australia, is commonly associated with the development of nuno felting, a key technique for contemporary art felting. German artist Joseph Beuys prominently integrated felt within his works. English artist Jenny Cowern shifted from traditional drawing and painting media into using felt as her primary media. This widespread revival is also supported by specialized online communities and resources, such as the Italian portal Feltro e Altro, which serves as a hub for both traditional and contemporary felt crafters.

Modern day felters with access to a broad range of sheep and other animal fibers have used knowledge of these different breeds to produce special effects in their felt. Fleece locks are classified by their Bradford or Micron count, which designate the fineness to coarseness of the material. Fine wools range from 64 to 80 (Bradford); medium 40–60 (Bradford); and coarse 36–60 (Bradford). Merino, the finest and most delicate sheep fleece, will be used for clothing that goes next to the body. Claudy Jongstra raises traditional and rare breeds of sheep with much hardier coats (Drenthe, Heath, Gotland, Schoonbeek, and Wensleydale) on her property in Friesland and these are used in her interior design projects. Exploitation of these characteristics of the fleece in tandem with the use of other techniques, such as stitching and incorporation of other fibers, provides felters with a broad range of possibilities.

== See also ==
- Baize
- Bowler hat
- Fuzzy-Felt
- Roofing felt
- Valenki

== General bibliography ==
- E. J. W. Barber. Prehistoric Textiles: The Development of Cloth in the Neolithic and Bronze Ages, with Special Reference to the Aegean. Princeton: Princeton University Press, 1991.
- Lise Bender Jørgensen. North European Textiles Until AD 1000. Aarchus: Aarchus University Press, 1992.
