= Twist tie =

Fastener/closure device

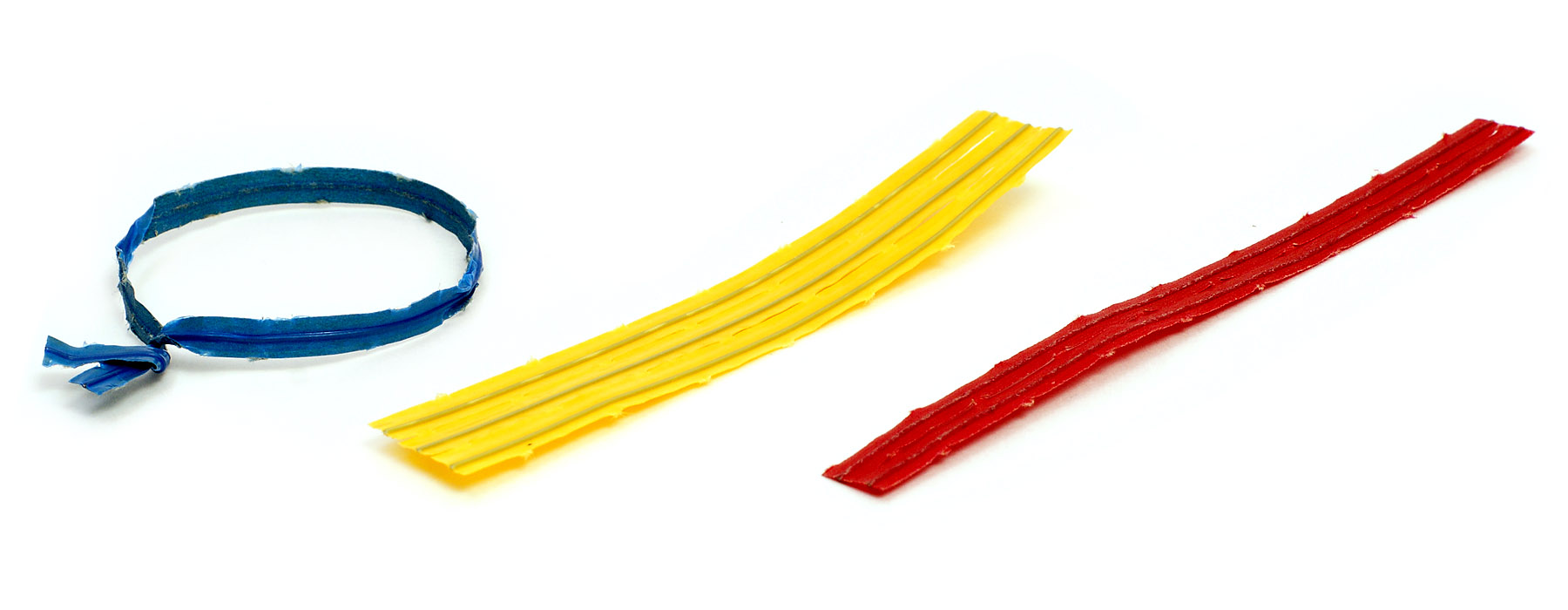

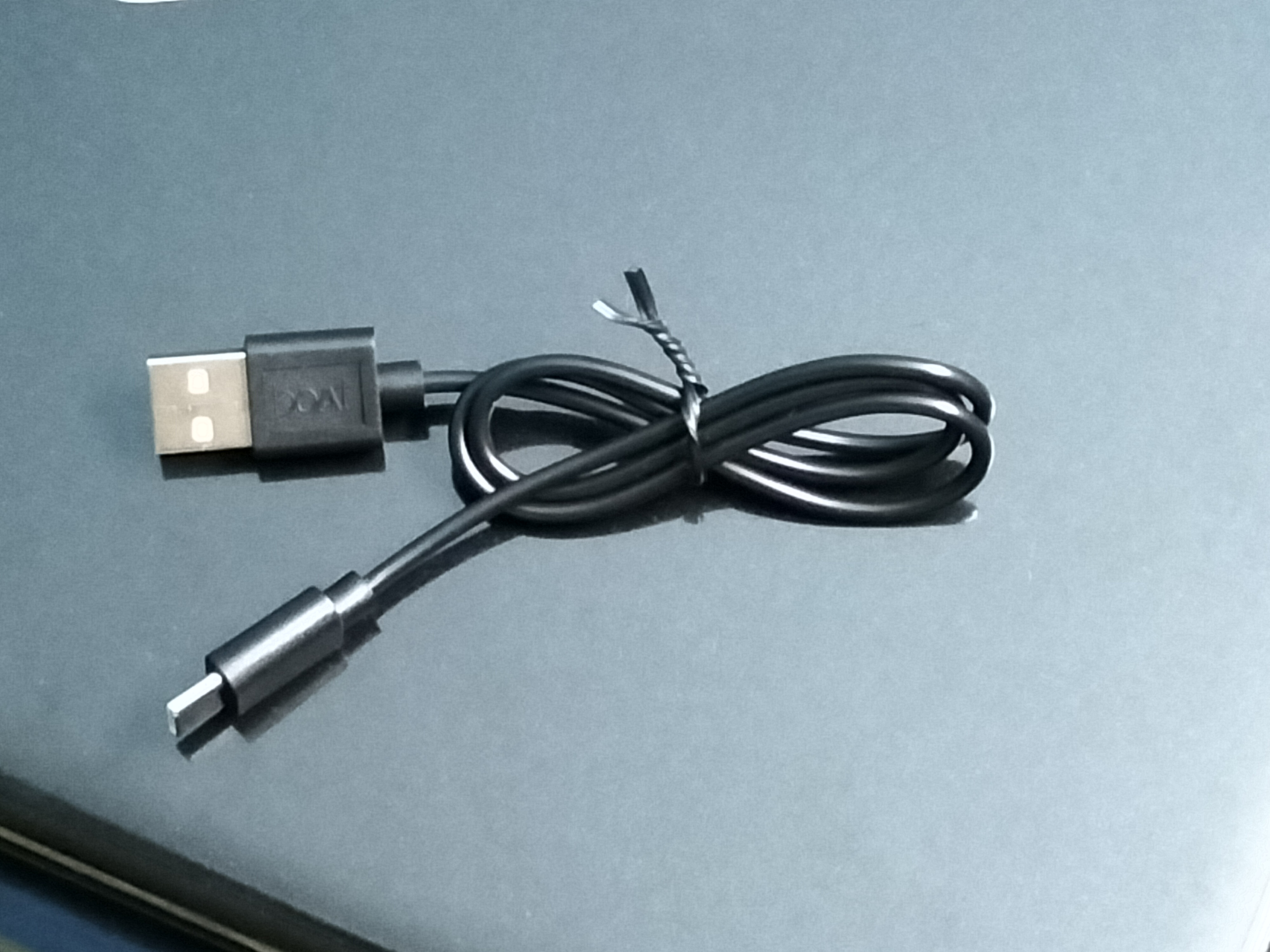
USB cable with twist tie

A twist tie is a fastener made of one or more metal wires encased in a thin strip of paper or plastic, in a way that it can bend and retain its shape. Wireless polymeric twist ties have also been developed.

== Use ==
It is used to tie the openings of containers, including bags such as garbage bags or bread bags. It is also called garden twist wire. A twist tie is used by wrapping it around the item to be fastened, then twisting the ends together. They are often included with boxes of plastic food bags or trash bags, and are commonly available individually in pre-cut lengths, on large spools, or in perforated sheets called gangs.

The outer covering can be in various colors with or without printing. Plain paper, metallic paper, plastic, poly, or custom coatings are popular for different applications. The plastic, poly, or metallic paper twist ties withstand water better than the uncoated paper versions. Different sizes and strengths are used for different applications, from a small closure for a bag of bread to a large, heavy tie to hold unwieldy garden hoses in place. A twist tie with a broad paper covering may also be used for labeling.

The wire is often made of stainless steel or galvanized steel with a diameter between 19 and 31 AWG (0.2 and 0.9 mm).

Charles E. Burford invented them in 1961.

== Application ==
Twist ties can be applied manually. They can be reapplied several times, facilitating reusable packaging.

Twist ties are often found in grocery stores in the United States for customers to use to secure their purchases into bags.

Banner/flag style twist ties have a large portion extended out from the twist tie that allows user to write and identify PLU/BIN numbers when purchasing things like trail mix, granola, hardware, and more.

Automatic and semi-automatic twist-tying equipment is also available; the US Patent Office has listed several hundred patents for automation methods.

== See also ==
- Cable tie
- Pipe cleaner
