= Ikuyo Fujita =

Japanese artist

Ikuyo Fujita 藤田育代
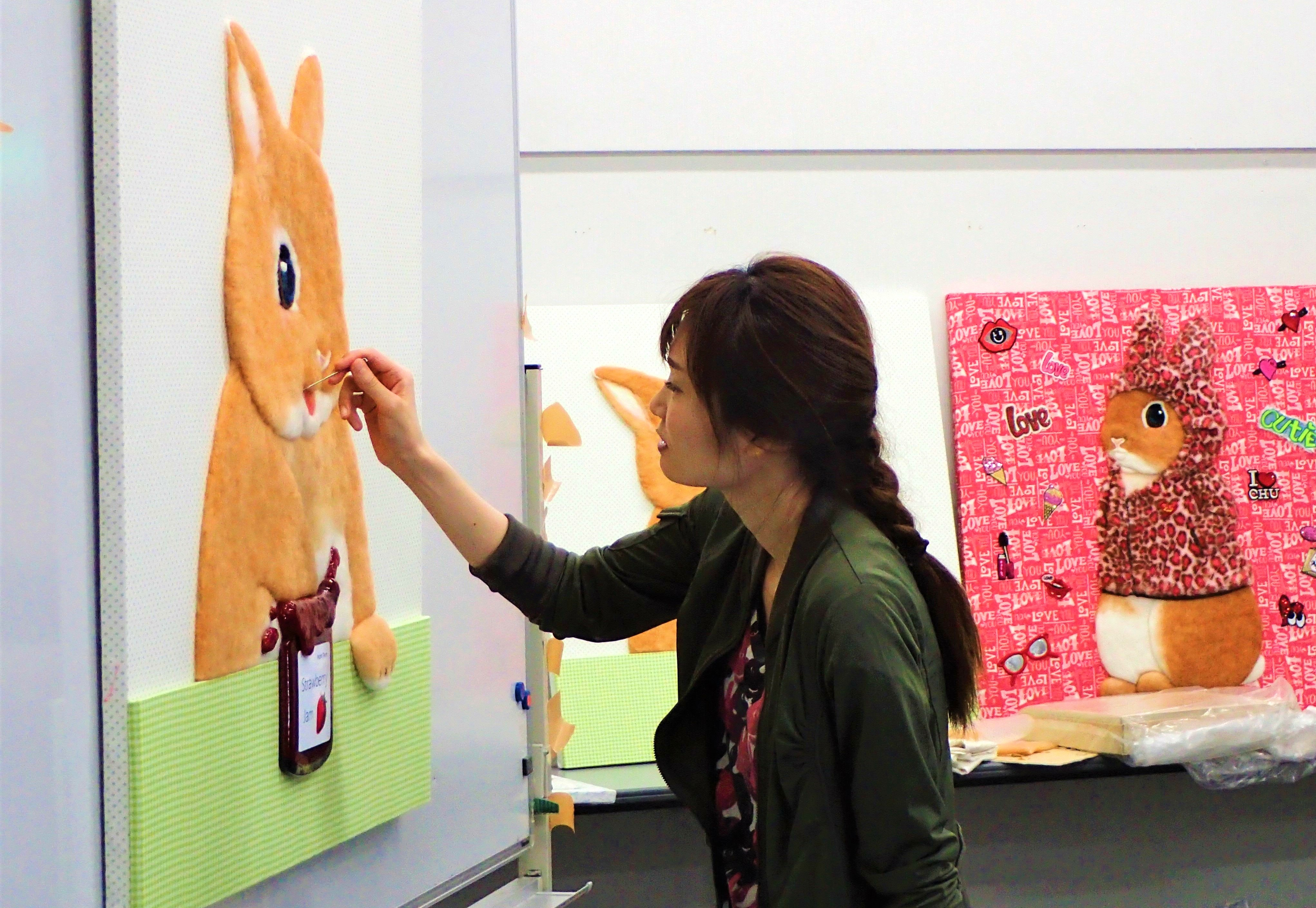
- Final Touch for Strawberry Jam I
- Born: Tokyo, Japan
- Movement: Pop art

Ikuyo Fujita (藤田育代, Fujita Ikuyo) is a Japanese artist who works primarily in needle felt painting and mogol (pipe cleaner) art. She is known for rabbit and cat art. Her kawaii style needle felt paintings are popular among rabbit lovers in Japan.

== Life and career ==
Fujita was born in Tokyo, Japan. She started needle felt painting in 2004. Her early works were portraits of her pet, a Netherland Dwarf Rabbit named Chibi-chan. Chibi-chan died in 2010 but Fujita continued to paint representations of her Netherland Dwarf.

Fujita's is a largely self-taught artist although her mother, an avid amateur handicrafts maker, showed her basics of the craftings. As a child, Fujita played with her mother's art materials and later began creating her own works as she grew older.

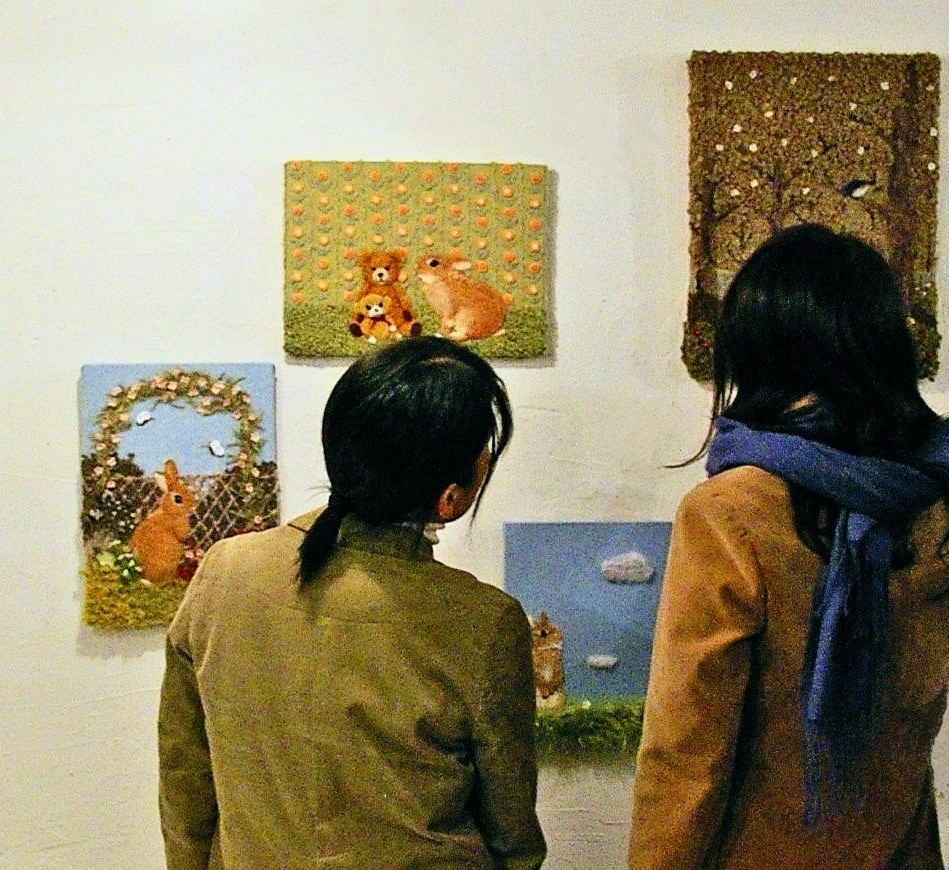
Little Expo#1 at Kanda Amulet, Tokyo Japan (2008)

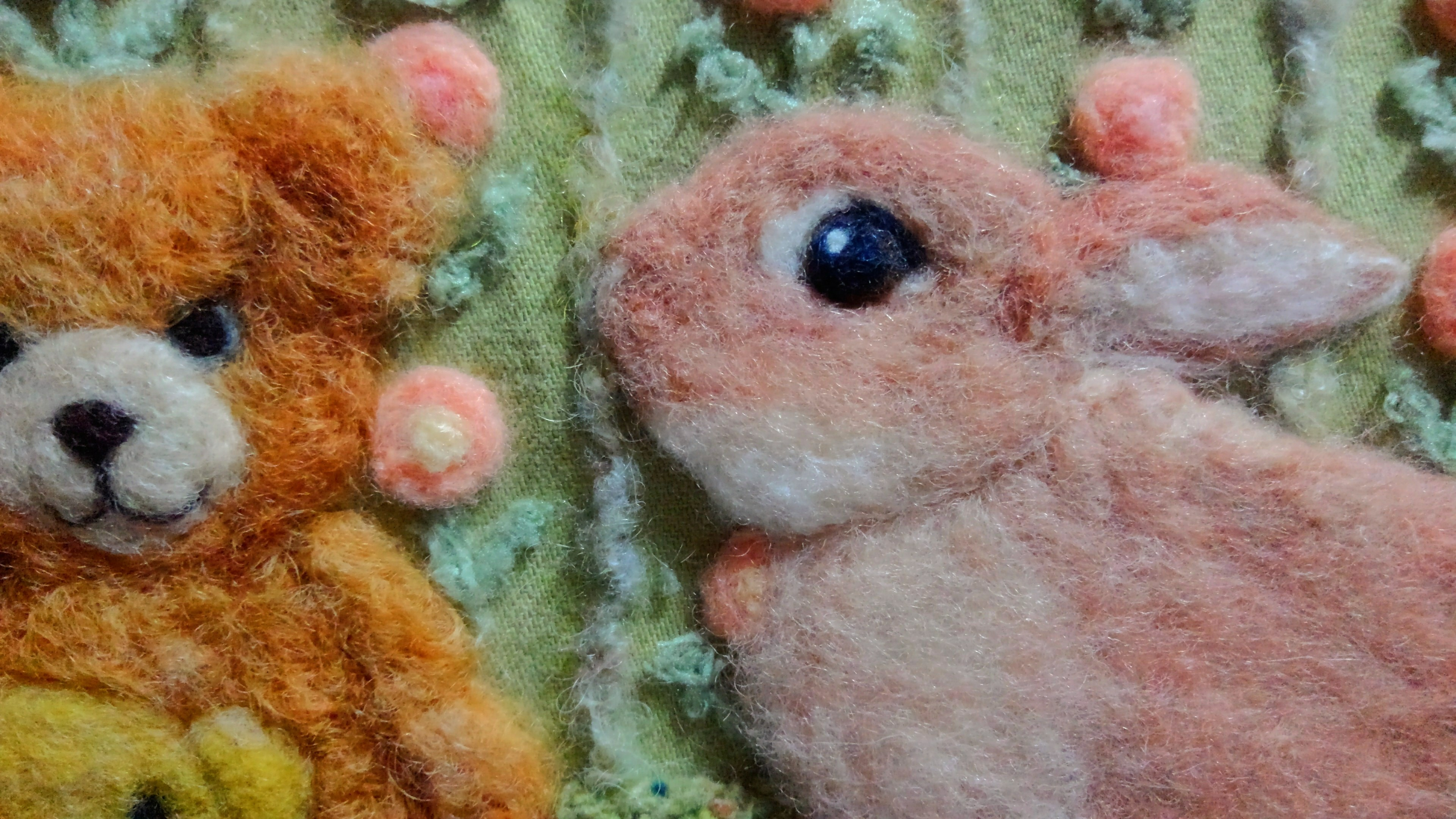
be my friend -ともだちになりたいな (2007 needle felt painting) / Closeup

In 2010, she published her artworks online. She had a solo exhibition in New York.

In 2012, Active Corporation in Japan published her rabbit art calendar and postcard, the calendar and the postcard were sold in major department stores in Japan. In the same year, her art instruction book was published by Magazine Land publishing in Japan. She started teaching art workshops in Japan Handicraft Association and Mitsukoshi cultural center.

In 2014, her art instruction book was translated and published in Taiwan, Hongkong, and Macau. Her artwork, lucky clover, was awarded new artist of the year at Kokusai Shiyoga Taisiyouten (Tokyo International Painting and Calligraphy Grand Prix Exhibition) in Japan.

In 2017, Active Corporation published her cat art postcards.

She is currently living in Tokyo.

She is also an art instructor and author of an art instruction book. Her book is available in Chinese.

== Exhibitions ==
=== Selected solo exhibitions ===
- 2013 Ikuyo Fujita's ~ A Rabbit's Needleworks II~ (藤田育代展 ～うさぎの針仕事II～) at Musashino Gallery in Koganei, Tokyo Japan
- 2012 Cute and puffy rabbits art exhibition (ふわっとかわいい うさぎ展) at AMULET in Oshiage, Tokyo, Japan.
- 2010 Love Cats and Rabbits at Ouchi Gallery in Brooklyn, New York USA
- 2009 Ikuyo Fujita's ~A Rabbit's Needleworks~ (藤田育代展 ～うさぎの針仕事) at AMULET in Kanda, Tokyo Japan
- 2019 12-artworks from Fujita's picture book, 'Yasashi-Mori' (やさしい森 - Kind Neighbors in a Forest) at Le Tiroir Galerie et Studio, Tokyo Japan
- 2023 Solo Exhibition - Artworks from Fujita's picture book, 'Yasashi-Mori' -Kind Neighbors in a Forest- Oyasumi Books Store, Saitama, Japan
- 2023 BUNNY'S TOY FACTORY THE STORE POP UP in Hyacinth - Hyacinth Antique Shop, Saitama, Japan

=== Selected group exhibitions ===
- 2024 IAG AWARDS 2024 - Gallery Michikusa Prize & Audience Award (Tokyo Metropolitan Theatre: 5th Floor Gallery, Tokyo)
- 2017 UMEDA ZOO at Osaka Hankyu Umeda, Osaka Japan
- 2015 Novelties of Artist at Shibuya SEIBU 100IDEES, Tokyo Japan
- 2014 Tokyo International Painting and Calligraphy, Grand Prix Exhibition at TOKYO METROPOLITAN ART MUSEUM, Tokyo Japan
- 2014 Artexpo New York 2014, New York USA
- 2013 CONTEMPORARY ART BELEM 2013 at Lisbon Centro Cultural de Belem, Lisbon Portugal
- 2013 NEKO RANMAN EXHIBITION at MeguroGAJYOEN, Tokyo Japan
- 2013 Fountain Art Fair at the Armory, New York USA
- 2013 The Unit State of International Artists, at Olga Santos Gallery, Porto Portogal
- 2012 Ren-ais-sance at Strange Loop Gallery, New York USA
- 2012 Fountain Art Fair at the Armory, New York USA
- 2011 Art Now Fair Miami, Florida USA
- 2011 Montreux Art Gallery, Montreux Switzerland

== Publications ==
- How to Make Cute and Puffy Rabbit Needle Felt Arts / Magazine Land publishing (ふわっとかわいい羊毛フェルトのうさぎ刺しゅう&雑貨 -マガジンランド) 2012 ISBN 4905054648
- Make Easy Wool Felt Art ~18 Japanese Rabbits / Shānyuè wénhuà publication, Taiwan (羊毛氈easy戳！18款日式質感兔子刺繍&雜貨 - 山岳文化) 2014 ISBN 978-986-248-386-2
- How to make rabbits with color mogol (カラーモールで作るキュートラビット) / Life with Rabbits Magazine (うさぎと暮らす Usagi to kurasu）No. 68 / Magazine Land publishing P38~39 May 2018 ASIN: B07CF6WDYS
- Bonus postcards (strawberry jam I, strawberry jam II) / Life with Rabbit Magazine (うさぎと暮らす Usagi to kurasu）No. 66 / Magazine Land publishing November 2017 ASIN: B000YESVI0
- Bonus postcards (winter vacation) / Life with Rabbit Magazine (うさぎと暮らす Usagi to kurasu）No. 58 / Magazine Land publishing November 2015 ASIN: B005D24TO8
- Featured artist (artworks: "fleecy clouds", "needlework of the rabbit", "marshmallow babies") / Time of Rabbits Magazine (うさぎの時間) No. 15 / Seibundou Sin-cousya publishing (誠文堂新光社刊) P15 April 2015 ISBN 978-4-416-61567-6
- Ikuyo Fujita Interview / Life with Rabbit Magazine (うさぎと暮らす Usagi to kurasu）No. 42/ Magazine Land publishing November 2011 ASIN: B0062O0LOI
- Handicraft techniques / Cute Handicrafts 100 (かわいい手づくり雑貨 100のつくり方) Futami Publishing (二見書房) November 2011 P58,60 ISBN 978-4-576-10172-9
- Featured artist (artworks: "nap", "first impression", "grooming") / Moe Magazine (MOE) Hakusen Publishing (白泉社) January 2009 P62
- Featured artist (artworks: "relaxing", "nighty nighty" tapestry, "my little flower garden", "the garden with an arch", "I'm not angry", "be my friend", "the profile of the thinking rabbit") / Cute Handicrafts 1000 (かわいい手づくり雑貨 1000の手芸) Futami publishing (二見書房) October 2008 P134,135 ISBN 978-4-576-08168-7
- Handicraft techniques / Kuri Kuri's Basic Handicrafting (別冊くりくり 手づくりのきほん) Futami publishing (二見書房) 2006 July P59～66 ISBN 4-576-06055-4
- Featured artist (artworks: "the profile of the thinking rabbit", "welcome to my garden", "nighty nighty", "relaxing") / Kuri Kuri Magazine (くりくり No. 3) Toui publication (糖衣社) No. 3 October 2004 P3～5 ISBN 4-576-04213-0

== Media appearance ==
- Kon-nichiwa Itto-rokken (Hello Kanto in Japanese) 「こんにちは いっと6けん」, 2011 NHK Tokyo, Japan
