= Nuno felting =

Fabric felting technique

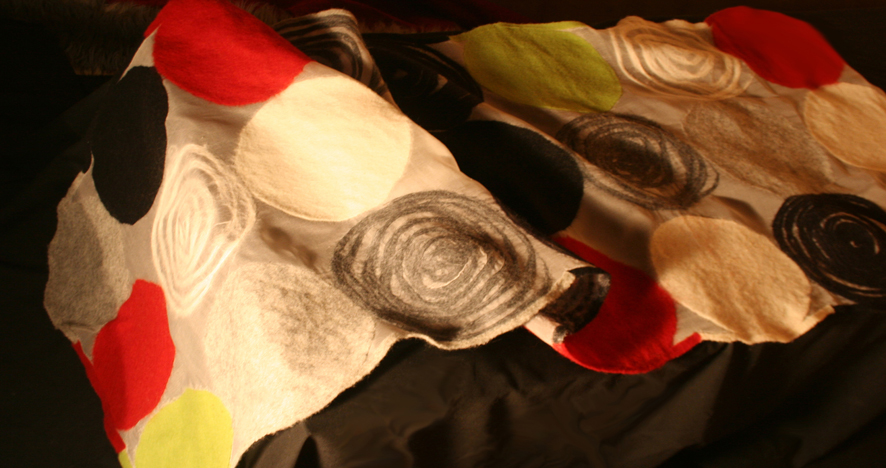
Example of Nuno felting by Elena Kihlman

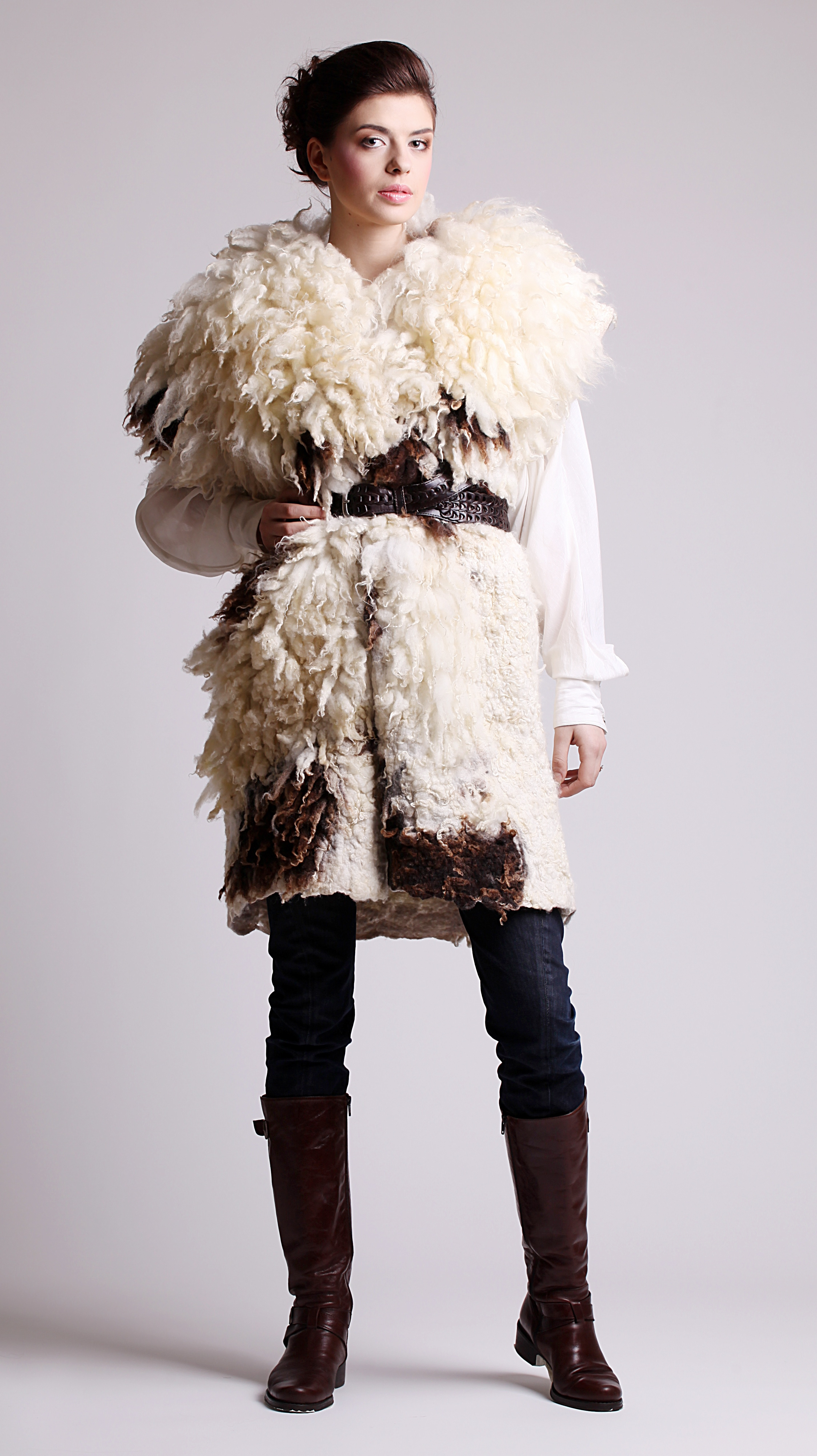
Spring 2012 Collection jacket by Eve Anders Fashion

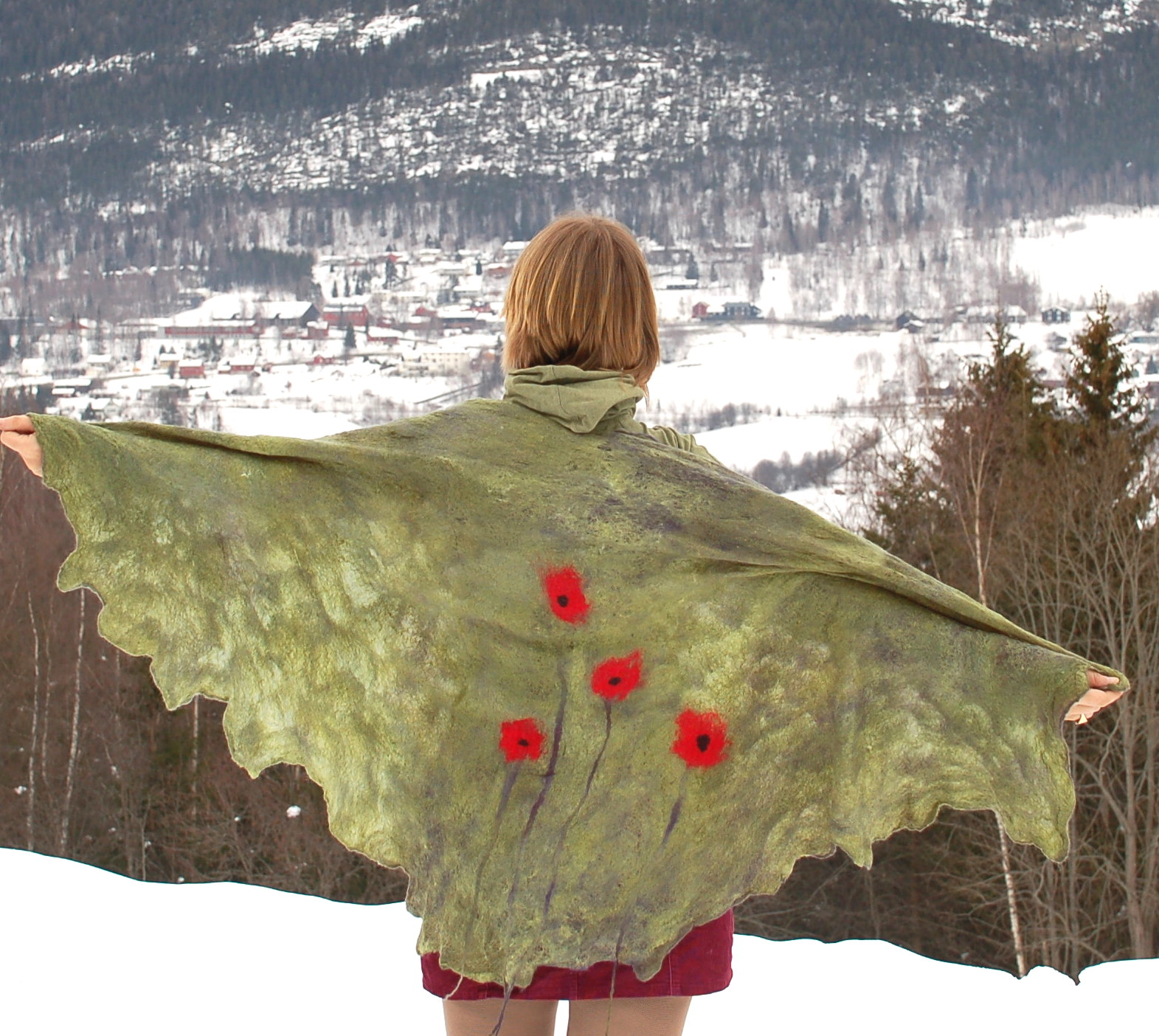
A poncho with poppies

Nuno felting is a fabric felting technique, by which various types of fibres (such as wool) are woven onto a sheer fabric (such as silk). Able to be created in different weights, Nuno felted fabric is suitable for creating a variety of types of garments. "Nuno" is derived from Japanese (布) and means cloth.

== History ==
Nuno felting was developed by Polly Stirling, a fibre artist from New South Wales, Australia, around 1992, while also being explored on the other side of the globe by Maria Livesey (née Grant), an undergrad student of textiles at Garay's School of Art, Aberdeen, Scotland, around 1993. The name "Nuno" is derived from Japanese (布) and means cloth.

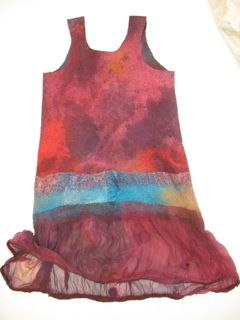
Nuno felted dress by Elynn Bernstein, of A Mano Studios

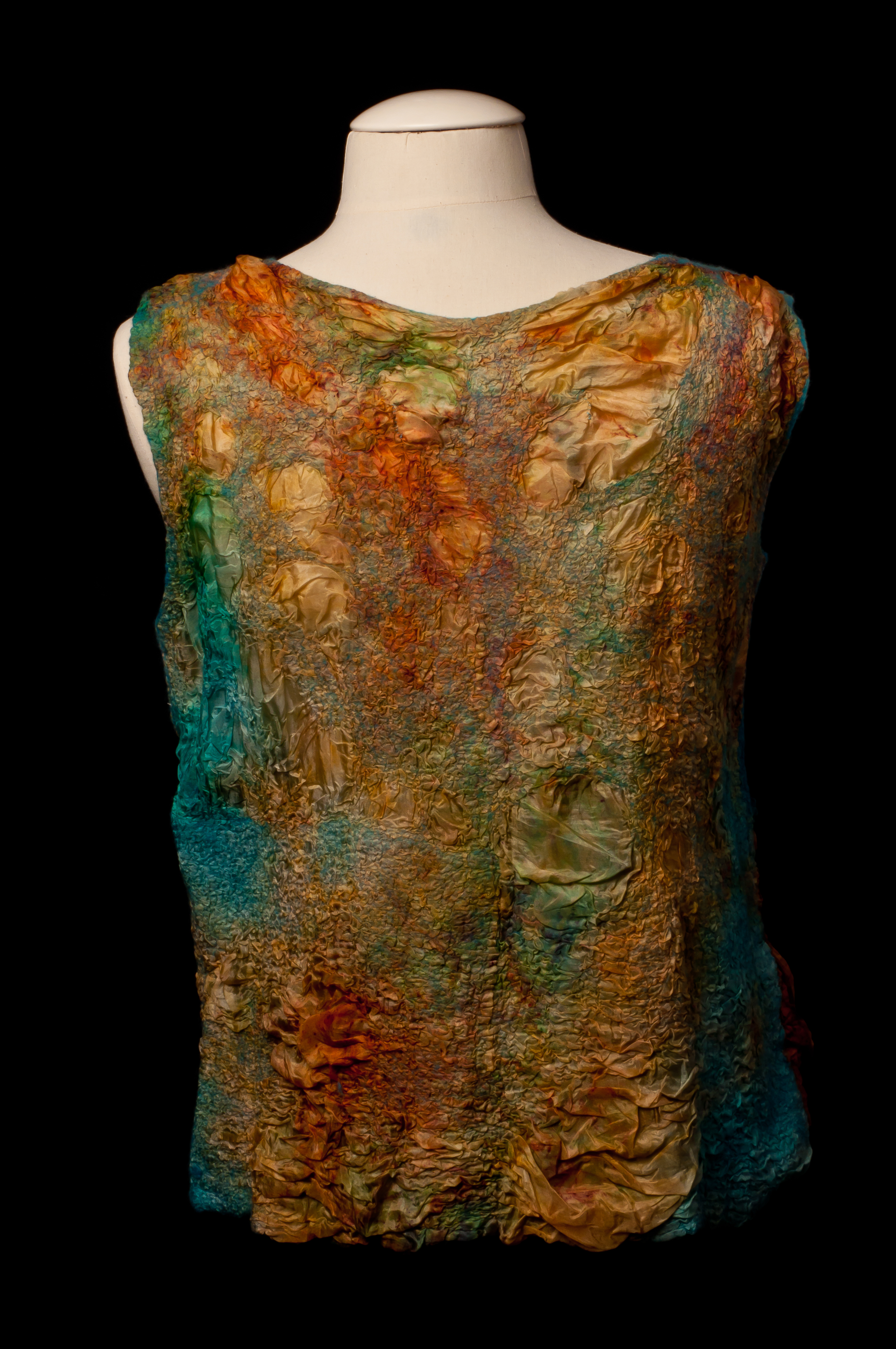
Rear view of Nuno felted top created by Debra Meyer Scott

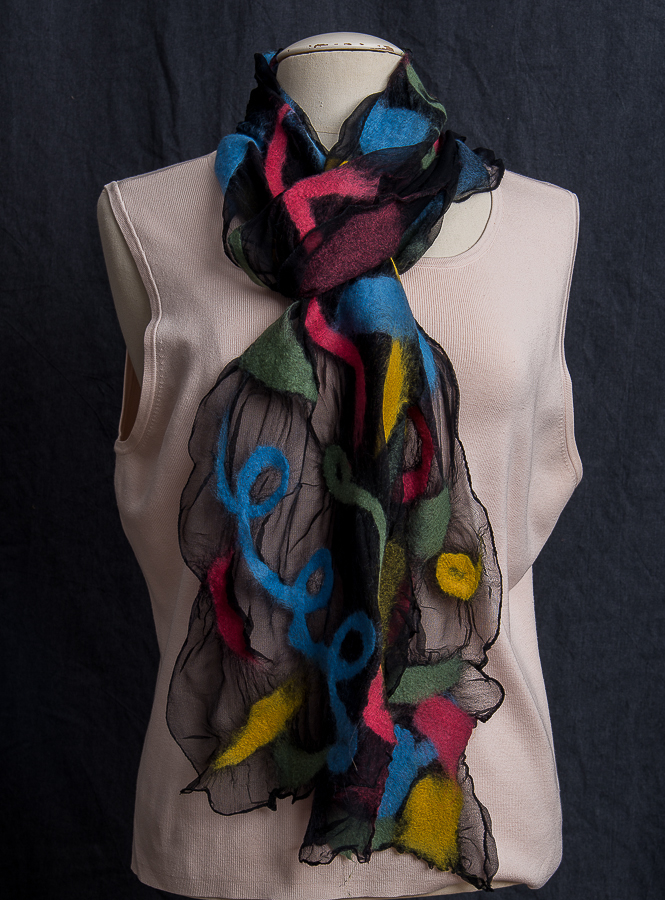
Nuno felted silk scarf using merino wool, created by Debra Meyer Scott

== Technique ==
The technique used in Nuno felting bonds loose fibre (usually sheep's wool) into a sheer fabric, such as silk gauze, creating a lightweight felt. Fabrics such as nylon, muslin, or other open weaves can be used as the felting background. Other fibres are also used to create different surface textures, such as wool from camel, llama, alpaca, Mohair goat, Cashmere goat, yak, and rabbit fur.

The fibres can completely cover the background fabric, or they may be used as a decorative design that allows the backing fabric to show. The technique often combines several layers of loose fibres to build up the finished fabric's colour, texture, and design elements.

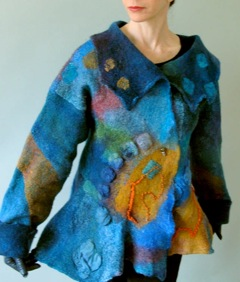
Nuno Felted Jacket by Elynn Bernstein / A Mano Studios

Nuno felting fabrics can be made in various weights, making them suitable for a diverse range of garment types. A lightweight Nuno fabric is made by laying one layer of loose fibre onto an open weave fabric base. A heavier Nuno fabric results from applying more layers onto the base, creating fabric suitable for a winter coat or scarf.
