= Tsuneko Taniuchi =

Japanese artist (1946–2026)

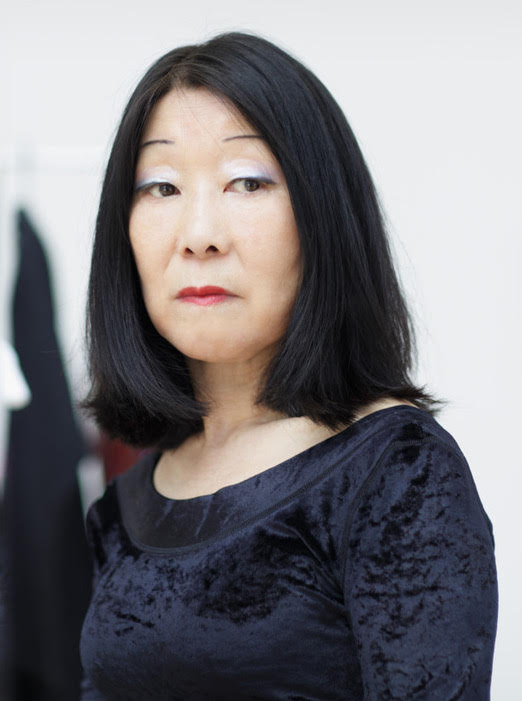
- Born: 17 December 1946; Nishinomiya, Hyôgo, Japan
- Died: 26 June 2026 (aged 79)
- Style: Performance
- Website: taniuchi.fr

Tsuneko Taniuchi (谷内恒子 Taniuchi Tsuneko; 17 December 1946 – 26 June 2026) was a Japanese-French contemporary artist, who used performance as her main medium. Her practice, which oscillates between scripted situations and participatory works, aims to question cultural, social, and sexual constructions, linked to notions of identity, immigrations, and feminism.

Taniuchi died on 26 June 2026, at the age of 79.

== Education and early works ==
After studying 20th-century Western art history and sociology at Kobe Jogakuin, Japan, Taniuchi studied at the Beaux-Arts de Paris (France) for two years between (1970–1972). From 1983 to 1987, she travelled extensively between New York, Paris, and Japan (Kobe, Tokyo), before settling permanently in France in 1987. Her early works focused first on paintings, and then on installations, including photographs, and videos.

== Works ==
In 1995, Taniuchi began her performance work, which she sees as a series of "micro-events." This term refers to the personal dimension of her actions, in relation to contemporary society and politics, in which she is generally the main performer alone or she directs a team of often female dancers, performers, actors, etc. The situations she sets up are the result of an intersection between the viewer, the art work and the artist with political and social questioning.

=== "Micro-Events /Weddings" series ===
Initiated in 2002 at the Galerie Jennifer Flay in Paris.

From 2002, the date France adopted the PACS - Civil Solidarity Pact, allowing same-sex couples to embrace a form of union close to civil marriage, Taniuchi developed a new series of Micro-Events called "Micro-Events/Weddings." Their aim is to question, through a variation of contexts, the social norms surrounding marriage; she "married" more than two hundred ninety people, men, women, all sexes and genders, and sometimes with several people at once.

=== Micro-Events /Daily Resistance ===
A selection of Taniuchi's performance series of her micro-events from 1995 to 2010, were exhibited at Le Générateur in 2011. The exhibition was conceived as a retrospective of the forty-one micro-events, created since 1995. The event combined the staging of previous performances reactivated by the artist and by women dancers/performers, narrations by actors of certain micro-events, and the exhibitions of video archives.

A monograph was also devoted to this series, distributed by R-Diffusion.

=== Micro-event 45 ===
Taniuchi repeatedly questioned the role and image of women in contemporary society, through a practice of disguise that take in socially determined contexts, as is the case with her performance "Micro-Event n°45 /Six Female Characters + A Women / Seven days" where she played the female roles of waitress, boxer, gymnast, homeless woman, Ganguro, and Ninja.

More recently, her work involved other performers—dancers, actors— around themes related to multiculturalism, postcolonialism and intersectional feminism.

== Exhibitions and performances (selection) ==
=== 2010–2020 ===
2020

- Micro-Event n°51 /It's the body as subjectivity. Le Générateur, Gentilly, France, 6 March.

2019

- Flower Bed, London East Asia Film Festival, (Film & Art), Tate Modern, Starr Cinema, London, UK, 26 October (cat. LEAFF2019).
- Lignes de vies - une exposition de légendes, curated by Frank Lamy, MAC VAL – Musée d’art contemporain du Val-de-Marne, France, 30 March – 25 August.
- Micro-Event 50 /My Body Is Political - Emily Harvey Foundation, New York, NY, 17–18 May.
- Hors Pistes 14e Édition, L’odeur de la lune vague après la Pluie, Judith Cahen and Masayasu Eguchi, Centre Pompidou, Paris, 2 February.

2018

- Micro-Event 50 /My Body Is Political, Le Générateur, Gentilly and Musée d’art et d’histoire de Saint -Denis, France, 17 November & 2 December.
- Micro-Event /Weddings Anniversary (installation), Quel Amour !? MP1-8, curated Eric Corne, Mac, Musée d’art contemporain de Marseille, France, 5 May – 2 September.

2017

- Micro-Event n°49 /Space Oddity – The Artist and Her Studio, Traversées Ren@rde, curated by Damien Sausset, Julie Crenn, Nadège Piton & Erik Noulette, Transpalette, Bourges, France, 21 October – 28 January 2018 (performance: 16 December).
- Micro-Event n°49 /Space Oddity – The Artist and Her Studio, Emily Harvey Foundation, NYC, 27 October (performance & screening).
- Herstory, des archives à l’heure des postféminismes, curated by Julie Crenn & Pascal Lievre, Maison des arts – centre d’art contemporain de Malakoff, France, 21 January – 19 March.
- Micro-Event n°6 bis /Fast Food – Sushi Merguez, La Nuit européenne des musées 2017, 2 May, curated by Frank Lamy & Julie Crenn, MAC VAL – Musée d’art contemporain du Val-de-Marne, in the exhibition Tous, des sang-mêlés, France, 24 April – 3 September.

2016

- Micro-Events 1995–2015, Légende, curated by Lauren Buffet for FRAC Franche-Comté, Besançon, France, 5 February – 7 May.
- Micro-Event n°49 /Space Oddity – The Artist and Her Studio, Le Générateur, Gentilly, France, 9 October.

2015

- Micro-Event n°44 /Theater of the (Re)presentation of Self, after "Fresh Acconci", Les lanceurs d’alerte – Carte Blanche à Sylvie Blocher, Mudam, Luxembourg, Luxembourg, 7 February.
- L’Effet Vertigo Parcours #7–New Hanging of Works from the Collection, Musée d’art contemporain du Val-de-Marne, Vitry–sur–Seine, France, 24.10.2015–2017.
- Micro-événement N° 14 /Love me tender, L’Effet Vertigo Parcours #7–New Hanging of Works from the Collection, 2002. 20 framed color photographs, 29.5 × 20.5 cm (each). MAC VAL Collection, 2011.

2014

- Tsuneko Taniuchi Micro-Events, solo exhibit, Ginza Maison Hermès, Le Forum, Tokyo, Japan, July 18–September 21.
- Micro-Event n°46 /Weddings in Tokyo, Ginza Maison Hermès Le Forum, Tokyo, Japan, 8 August.
- Micro-Event n°45 /Six Female Characters + A Woman / Seven Days, Ginza Maison Hermès, Le Forum, Tokyo, Japan, July 18–September 21.

2012

- Situation(s) [48°47 34 N / 2°23 14 E], curated by Frank Lamy, MAC VAL – Musée d’Art Contemporain du Val-de- Marne, France, 30 June–23 September.
- Micro-Event n°42 /Weddings in the Summer Gardens, Situation(s) [48°47 34 N / 2°23 14 E], curated by Frank Lamy, MAC VAL – Musée d’Art Contemporain du Val-de-Marne, France, 1 July.
- Micro-Event n°25 /Public communication bar / VIPCocktails, Neon. La materia lumino- sa dell’arte, curated by David Rosenberg & Bartolomeo Pietromarchi, MACRO – Museum of Contemporary Art of Rome, Italy, 6 June.

2011

- Micro-Events /Daily Resistances, Le Générateur, Gentilly, France, 22 October – 30 October.
- Micro-Event n°41 /Flower Bed, Nuit Blanche, curated by Alexia Fabre and Frank Lamy, Hôtel Amour, Paris, 1 October.

2010

- Micro-Event /Weddings Anniversary, Rendez-vous du forum, Session 2, Centre Georges Pompidou, Paris, 2010 – CNAP Collection 2013.

=== 2000–2010 ===
2009

- Micro-Event n°13, La Force de l’Art 02, Grand Palais, Paris, 30 May. 15 April 24–June 1.
- Micro-Event n°36 /Ice Vitrine, Lilith Performance Studio, Malmö, Sweden, 13 February.
- Micro-Event n°5 /Nine Female Characters + Queen Béatrice, tijdenstefaf, organized with Nadja Vilenne Gallery, Theater aan het Vrijthof, Maastricht, Netherlands, 8 March – 16 March.

2007

- Feminist Art Base, Elizabeth A. Sackler Center for Feminist Art, curated by Maura Reilly, Brooklyn Museum, Brooklyn, New York.
- Micro-Event n°25 /Public communication bar / VIPCocktails, invited by Nadja Vilenne Gallery, Art Brussels, Brussels, Belgium, 19 April.

2006

- Micro-Event n°18bis Marianne, La Force de l’Art 01, curated by Hou Hanru, Grand Palais, Paris, 10 May – 25 June.

2005

- Micro-Event n°26 /I Get Married in Chinese, Miss China Beauty Gallery, Paris, 8 February – 28 February.
- Micro-Event n°25 /Public communication bar / VIPCocktails, Scènes de vie, Swiss Cultural Centre, Paris, 30 October – 18 December.

2004

- Micro-Event n°24 /Weddings, Liverpool Biennial, Liverpool Biennial, Tate Liverpool, Independents district, Liverpool, 18 September–28 November.
- Micro-Event n°25 /Public communication bar / VIPCocktails, Occupations #1, MAC VAL- Musée d’art contemporain du Val-de-Marne, France, 22 October – 24 October.

2003

- Micro-Event n°21 /Marriage Candidates, Intimités, Hôtel de Ville, Paris, 7 March – 9 March.

2002

- Micro-Event n°14 /Future Bride Likes to Paint, Art & Vitrine, Rougier & Plé, Paris, 15 January – 1 February.
- Micro-Event n°14 /Love Me Tender, Sens Dessus-Dessous, Galerie Jennifer Flay, Paris, 26 January – 3 February.

2001

- Micro-Event n°11 /Tsuneko Troc, Tokyorama, curated by Nicolas Bourriaud and Jérôme Sans, Palais de Tokyo, Paris, 1 September – 30 September.
- Micro- Event n°11 /Tsuneko Troc, in Arts d’Attitudes, Le Lieu, Québec, (France au Québec / La saison), organized by l’AFAA et Le Lieu, 6 September – 8 September.
- Micro- Event n°9 bis /A Female Boxer, Je ne suis pas une Pénélope, Espace Culturel François Mitterrand, Beauvais, France, 18 November – 13 January.
- Micro-Event n°6 /Berlin / Fast Food, Künstlerhaus Bethanien, Berlin, (Villa Médicis Hors les Murs 2000/AFAA), 21 October.
- Ganguro Girl, Les Revues parlées – Machines, Centre Georges Pompidou, Paris, 15 December.
- Micro-Event n°12 /The Right to Housing, Rewind, Glassbox, Paris, March–21 April.

2000

- Micro-Event n°5 /Nine Female Characters, Paris pour escale, curated by Hou and Evelyne Jouanno, Museum of Modern Art of the City of Paris, 7 December – 18 February 2001.

=== 1980–2000 ===
1999

- Micro-Event n°5 /Nine Female Characters, Transpalette, Bourges, France, 9 October – 7 November.
- Expériences du divers, Galerie Art & Essai / Université Rennes 2, Rennes, France, 18 May – 26 June.

1998

- Passeurs, Centre national de la Photographie, curated by Julie Sauerwein and Adriaan Himmelreich, Paris, 29 April – 6 June.
- Gare de l’Est, curated by Hou Hanru and Enrico Lunghi, Casino Luxembourg / Forum d’art contemporain, Luxembourg, 12 December – 21 February 1999.
- Ici, ailleurs et nulle part, Quartier Éphémère, Montreal, Canada, 21 November – 20 December (exhibition-residency)
- Micro-Event n°20 /How to Become a Good Housewife, Ici, ailleurs et nulle part, Quartier Éphémère, Montreal, Canada, 21 November.

1997

- Parisien(ne)s, curated by Hou Hanru, and organized by Iniva in collaboration with Camden Arts Centre, 7 February – 23 March.

1995

- Micro-Event n°1 /Ato No Matsuri /Too Late, Chez Valentin Gallery, Paris, 8 July.
- You are not invited / Collection de Nora, Heart Gallery, Paris, 21 November – 13 December.
- Strangers in Paradise (Étrangères au Paradis), curated by Michel Nuridsany, Le monde de l'art, Paris, 11 April – 27 May.

1994

- Chaque génération paye les erreurs de la précédente, curated by Hou Hanru, Hôpital Éphémère, Paris, 8 January – 9 January.

1991

- Il reste toujours une place, Credit Agricole gallery, Poitiers, France, 8 October – 31 October.

1989

- Galerie du Triangle, Bordeaux, France.

1986

- Galerie Moris, Tokyo, Japan.

1983

- Jack Tilton Gallery, New York.

== Awards ==
- 2025 Prix d'honneur, AWARE (Archives of Women Artists Research & Exhibitions)
