= Noriko Tsuiki =

Japanese textile artist, weaver (born 1952)

- 築城 則子
- Born: 1952 (age 73–74); Kitakyushu, Fukuoka Prefecture, Japan
- Education: Waseda University
- Occupations: Textile artist, weaver, author, printmaker

Noriko Tsuiki (Japanese: 築城 則子, born 1952) is a Japanese textile artist and weaver, best known for reviving the lost tradition of Kokura-ori (striped cotton weaving from Kokura, Fukuoka Prefecture). She is the president of Yuh Textile Studio and a member of the Japan Art Crafts Association.

== Biography ==
Tsuiki was born in 1952 in Kitakyushu, Fukuoka Prefecture. She studied at the School of Letters, Arts and Sciences, Waseda University, leaving in 1974 to pursue dyeing and weaving independently. She studied tsumugi-ori (pongee weaving) and kimono making in Kumejima (Okinawa), the Shinshu region, and other areas.

In 1984 she successfully revived the dormant Kokura-ori tradition, followed by the revival of Kokura-chijimi in 1994. In 1996, she was selected as a trainee for successors to traditional crafts under Takeshi Kitamura, a recognized Living National Treasure. That same year, the Kitakyushu Municipal Museum of Art held a solo exhibition of her work.

== Career ==
Tsuiki is renowned for her revival of Kokura stripes, a cotton fabric once produced in Kokura for over 350 years until it disappeared in the early Shōwa period. Traditionally used for samurai hakama and obi, Kokura-ori is distinguished by vertical stripes created with warp threads at three times the density of the weft, producing a strong, smooth, and lustrous fabric.

In 1984, she revived Kokura-ori as a handwoven art textile. Since 2007, she has also directed the development of machine-woven Kokura fabrics under the brand Kokura Shima–Shima, extending the traditional craft to wide-width fabrics (140 cm) suitable for fashion and interiors. These textiles have been used by interna.

Her works are held in major museum collections including the National Museum of Modern Art, Tokyo, and the Victoria and Albert Museum in London.

She exhibits regularly, including at the annual Japan Art Crafts Exhibitions and the Fukuoka Prefectural Art Exhibition.

== Exhibitions ==
Tsuiki has held numerous solo exhibitions in Japan and abroad, including:

- 1996 – Noriko Tsuiki Textile Exhibition, Kitakyushu Municipal Museum of Art, Tobata-ku, Kitakyushu, Japan
- 1999, 2003, 2013, 2021 – Noriko Tsuiki Textile Exhibition, Wako Hall, Ginza, Tokyo, Japan
- 2004 – Cool & Light: New Spirit in Craft Making, National Museum of Modern Art, Tokyo, Japan
- 2005 – Wings of Cicada, London, England
- 2012 – Giappone. Terra di incanti, Museo degli Argenti, Florence, Italy
- 2014 – Noriko Tsuiki – Stripes Today, Kitakyushu Municipal Museum of Art, Tobata-ku, Kitakyushu, Japan
- 2016 – Parabolic Stripes, Milan Design Week (INTERNI Open Borders), Milan, Italy
- 2022 – The Rebirth of Kokura Ori: The Beauty of Stripes, Matsuya Ginza, Tokyo

== Awards ==
Tsuiki has received numerous awards for her contributions to textile arts, including:

- 2005 – Prize for Excellence, 25th Pola Traditional Japanese Culture Awards
- 2008 – Excellence Award of the Commissioner for Cultural Affairs
- 2010 – Grand Prize, Asahi Shimbun
- 2012 – Fukuoka Prefectural Cultural Prize (Creator Division)
- 2015 – 1st Kikuchi Kanjitsu Award
- 2018 – Regional Person of Cultural Merit Award, Agency for Cultural Affairs of Japan
- 2022 – Mitsui Golden Takumi Award, Special Recognition Award
