= Pipe cleaner =

Brush used for cleaning pipes or crafting

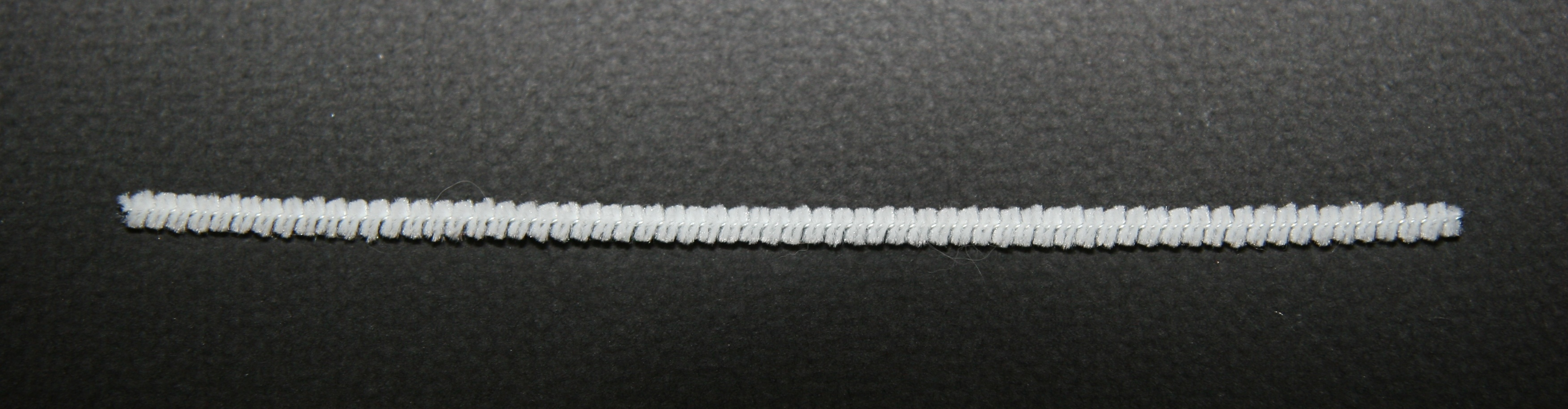
A plain white pipe cleaner

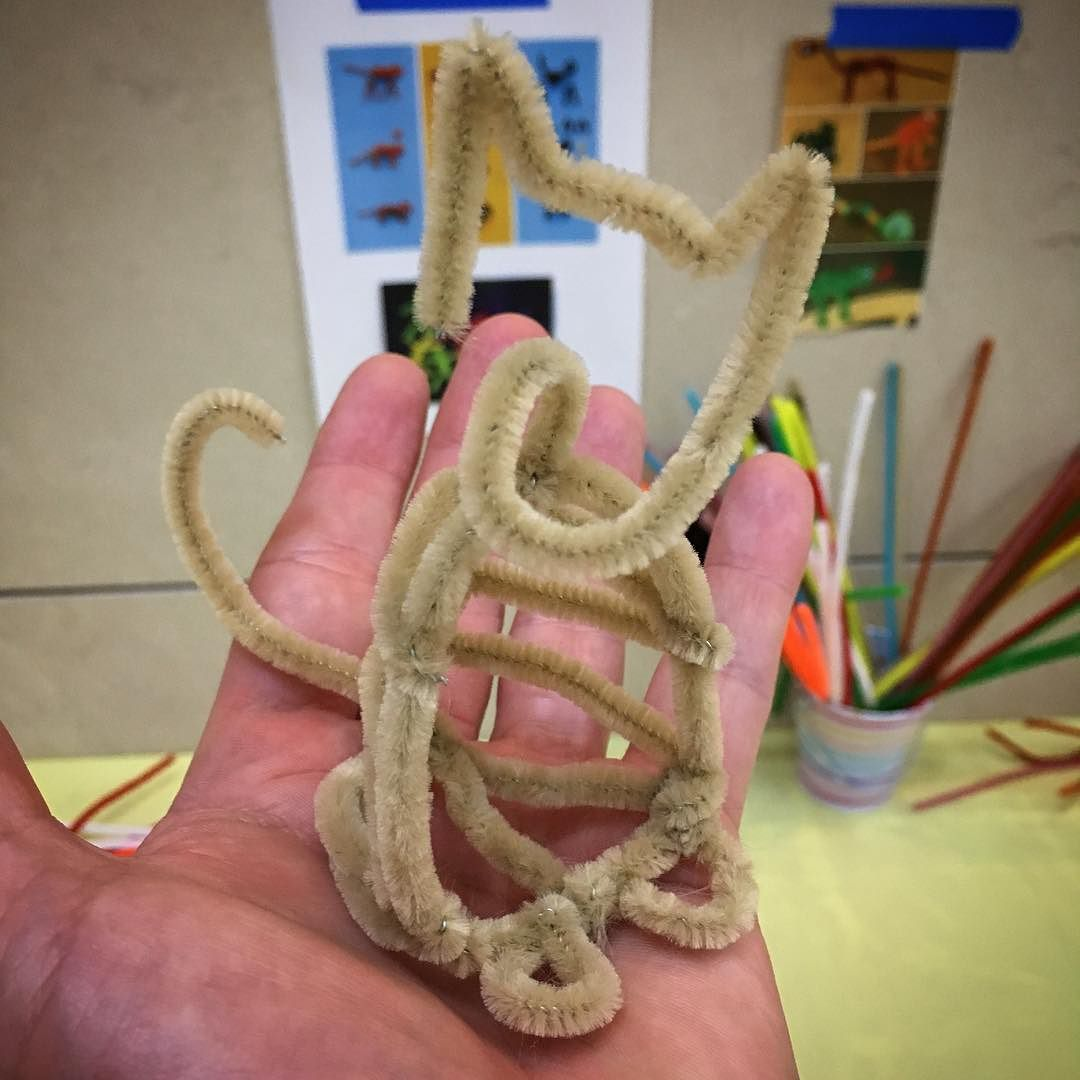
A model of a cat made from pipe cleaners

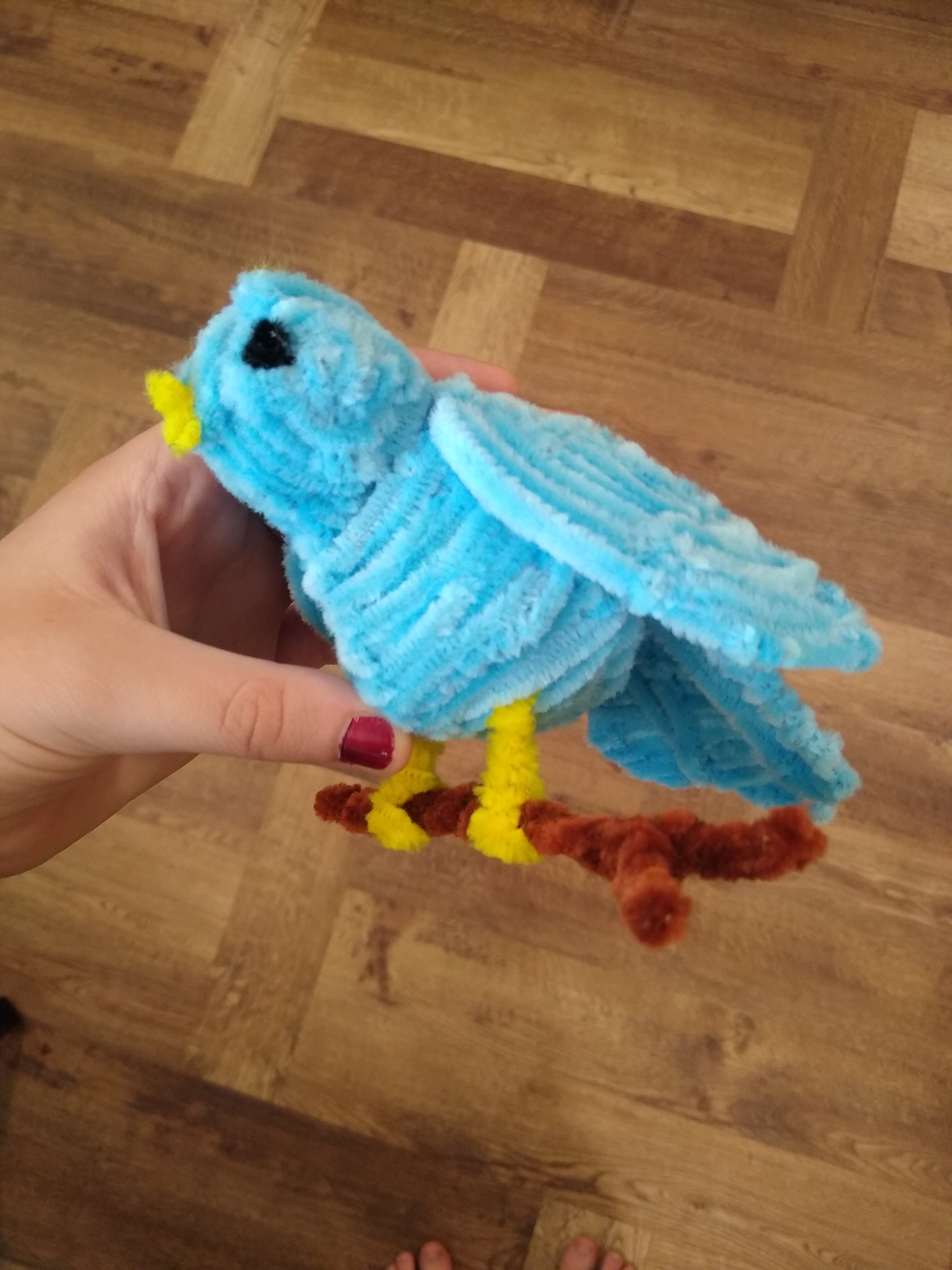
A sculpture of a bird made from pipe cleaners

A pipe cleaner, otherwise referred to as a chenille stem, is a type of brush originally intended for removing moisture and residue from smoking pipes. They can also be used for any application that calls for cleaning out small bores or tight places. Special pipe cleaners are manufactured specifically for cleaning out medical apparatus and for engineering applications.

Outside their originally intended purpose, they are commonly used in crafts, and are also popular for winding around bottle necks to catch drips, bundling things together, as a twist tie, colour-coding, and as a makeshift brush for applying paints, oils, solvents, greases, and similar substances.

== Description ==
Smoking pipe cleaners normally use some absorbent material, usually cotton or sometimes viscose. Bristles of stiffer material, normally monofilament nylon or polypropylene, are sometimes added for better scrubbing. Microfilament polyester is used in some technical pipe cleaners because polyester wicks liquid away rather than absorbing it as cotton does. Some smoking pipe cleaners are made conical or tapered so that one end is thick and the other is thin. The thin end is for cleaning the small bore of the pipe stem, and the thick end for the bowl or the wider part of the stem. When used for cleaning, pipe cleaners are normally discarded after one or two uses.

== History ==
John Harry Stedman and Charles Angel invented pipe cleaners in Rochester, New York, in the early 1900s, later sold to BJ Long Company, with a possibly parallel invention by Johan Petter Johansson in 1923.

== Crafts ==
Pipe cleaners are commonly used in arts and crafts projects. Craft pipe cleaners are usually made with polyester or nylon pile and are often longer and thicker than the "cleaning" type, and available in many colors. Craft pipe cleaners are not very useful for cleaning, because the polyester does not absorb liquids, and the thicker versions may not even fit down the stem of a normal pipe or into the usual hard-to-access area of applications that call for cleaning small bores or tight places.

In Japan, crafting with pipe cleaners is known as Mogol art. Its name derived from the Portuguese word Mughal for a style of weaving. Workshops in malls and schools in Japan have been led by Atushi Kitanaka to support the pipe cleaner industry. Ikuyo Fujita (藤田育代 Fujita Ikuyo) is a Japanese artist who works primarily in needle felt painting and mogol (pipe cleaner) art. Use of pipe cleaners as an art form where animals are made by twisting pipe cleaners together. They can also be used to create whiskers for an animal mask or nose.

In classroom settings, craft pipe cleaners are often used for a variety of reasons, including creating simple models, creating complex models, or as learning aids for various topics.

== Manufacture ==
A pipe cleaner is made of two lengths of wire, called the core, twisted together, trapping short lengths of fibre between them, called the pile. Pipe cleaners are usually made two at a time, as the inner wires of each pipe cleaner have the yarn wrapped around them, making a coil; the outer wires trap the wraps of yarn, which are then cut, making the tufts. Chenille yarn is made in much the same way, which is why craft pipe cleaners are often called "chenille stems". The word "chenille" comes from French, meaning "caterpillar". Some pipe cleaner machines are actually converted chenille machines. Some machines produce very long pipe cleaners, which are wound onto spools. The spools may be sold as-is or cut to length depending on the intended use. Other machines cut the pipe cleaners to length as they come off the machines. Smoking pipe cleaners are usually 15–17 cm (5.9–6.7 in) long. Craft ones are often 30 cm (12 in) and can be up to 50 cm (20 in). They come in 4 mm, 6 mm, and 15 mm diameter sizes. Jumbo pipe cleaners have a 30 mm diameter with lengths of 45 cm (18 in) and 2 metres (6.6 feet).
