= Matsuda Yuriko =

Japanese artist (born 1943)

Matsuda Yuriko (born 1943) is a Japanese ceramic artist.

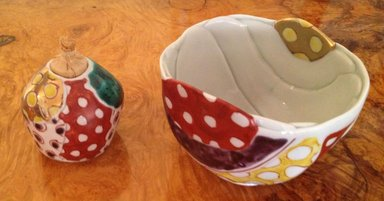
Matsuda Yuriko, Tea Caddy and Tea Bowl, The Brooklyn Museum

== Early life ==
Yuriko was born in a city in Hyōgo Prefecture called Ashiya, Japan. She received her B.A and graduate degree in ceramics at Kyoto City University of Arts. Her professor at the time was Kenkichi Tomimoto, who was a famous potter during post-war Japan.

== Work and accomplishments ==
Matsuda Yuriko was a visiting artist in the exhibition Soaring Voices, which focused on female Japanese ceramic artists. Her work is in The Brooklyn Museum, the Yale University Art Gallery, the Spencer Museum of Art at the University of Kansas, the San Antonio Museum of Art, and the University of Hawaii Art Gallery, among others.

=== Soaring Voices ===
Soaring voices was a moving exhibition that traveled from Japan, France, and to North America. It primarily focused on ceramic works made by female Japanese artists, which included Matsuda Yuriko. The exhibition was a response towards Japan's history of masculine ceramic arts. This is why the works made by the women in this exhibition include nature motifs as well as concepts of light and shadow.

== Themes and influences ==
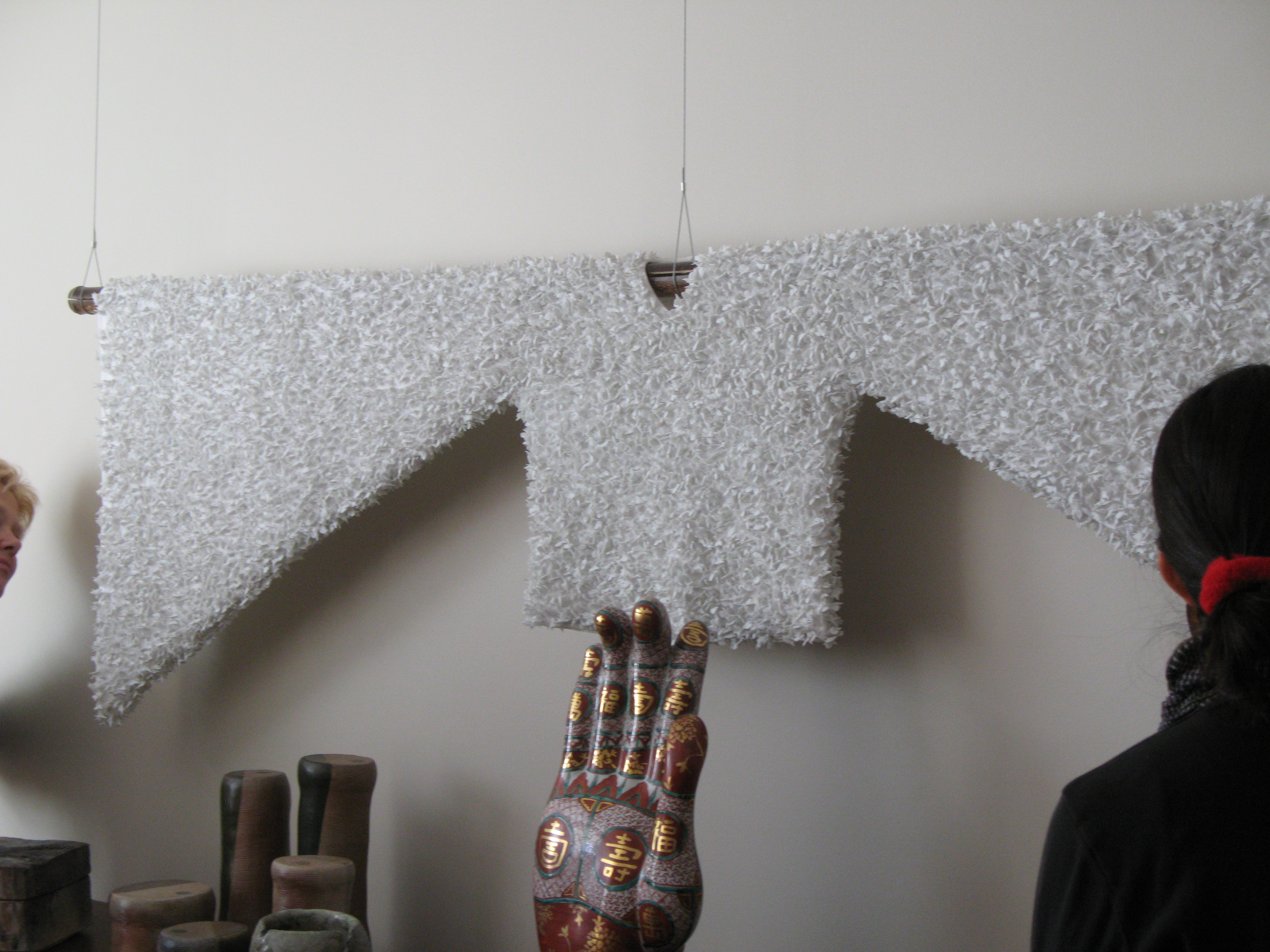
One of Matsuda's ceramic works with red and gold details.

Matsuda’s work is often centered on female body shapes, painted with bright colors, and hand-built. Her forms are irregular and playful, often dealing with themes of parody and exaggeration. Her works range from ceramic feet, teapots mounted with bananas, irregular vessels decorated with eggplants, ceramic buttocks, bell pepper forms, and roller skates, all handcrafted and colorfully painted. Her work shares elements with Dadaism, sharing playful elements with Man Ray and Elsa Schiaparelli. It often depicts decorations in red enamel with gold kinrande detailing, in the style of Imari porcelain export wares. Matsuda’s work subverts the traditional Japanese uses of colored glazes and gold patterning by applying them to a pair of porcelain feet, mounted on wooden blocks. Her work is not designed for strict functionality. Rather, they diverge from witty cultural commentary to self-expression.

This break from tradition may be linked to the exclusion of women from the ceramic arts in Japan. Despite Japan’s long history of ceramic arts, Matsuda’s work may be read as springing from post-war alternatives and away from Japan's traditional, masculine forms and its androcentric apprentice system. As women studied ceramics in universities, they broke from the traditional apprentice system, which primarily focused on functional vessels. However, women were still relegated to the outskirts of ceramic production, such as adding decorations and glazes. In extreme cases, other women couldn't fathom to use a kiln, but rather be seen as a support beam for their male counterparts. Before and during World War II, Women remained on the periphery of the ceramic world until the further development of post-war materials and the increasingly common education from universities as well as normalized appearance of gas and electric kiln. After World War II, Japanese ceramic work shifted in more sculptural, experimental, and expressive directions.

=== Public Collections ===
- Yamanashi Museum of Art
- Takamatsu City museum
- The Shigaraki Ceramic Cultural Park
- Museum of Modern Ceramic Art, Gifu
- National Museum of History, Taiwan
- Barcelona Ceramic Museum, Spain
- Icheon World Ceramic Center, Korea
- Denver Museum of Art, Colorado
- Spencer Museum of Art, Kansas
- Yale University Art Gallery, Connecticut
- Hawaii State Art Foundation
- Minneapolis Institute of Arts, Minnesota
- Seattle Art Museum, Washington
- The Brooklyn Museum, New York
