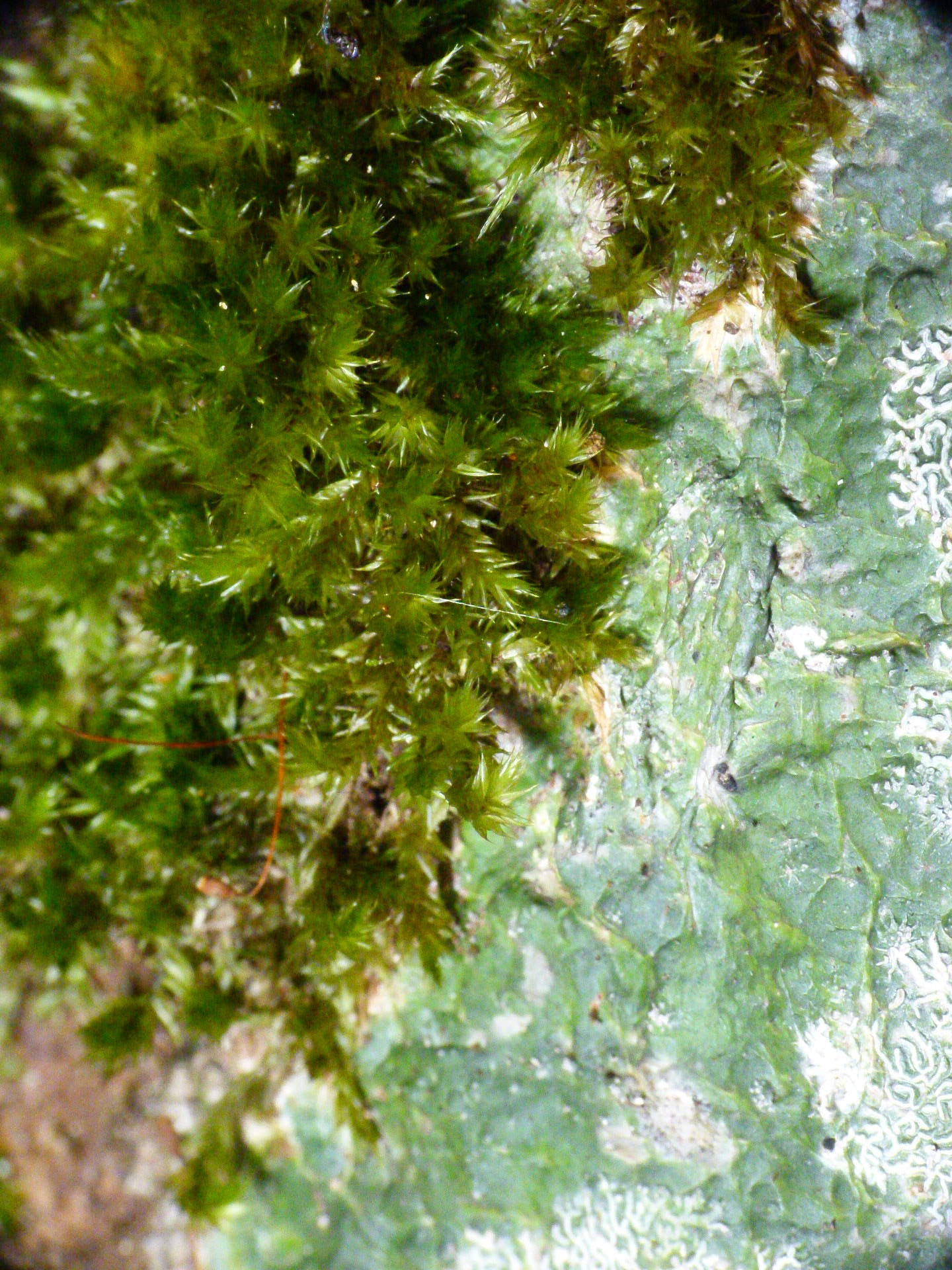
- Spread of Garovaglia sp. controlled by a crustaceous lichen in Wynaad, India, 2016

Scientific classification
- Kingdom: Plantae
- Division: Bryophyta
- Class: Bryopsida
- Subclass: Bryidae
- Superorder: Hypnanae
- Order: Ptychomniales; W.R. Buck, C.J. Cox, A.J. Shaw & Goffinet

Families
- Garovagliaceae W.R. Buck & Vitt, 1986; Ptychomniaceae

Synonyms
- Ptychomniineae

= Ptychomniales =

Order of mosses

Ptychomniales is an order of mosses in the subclass Bryidae.
