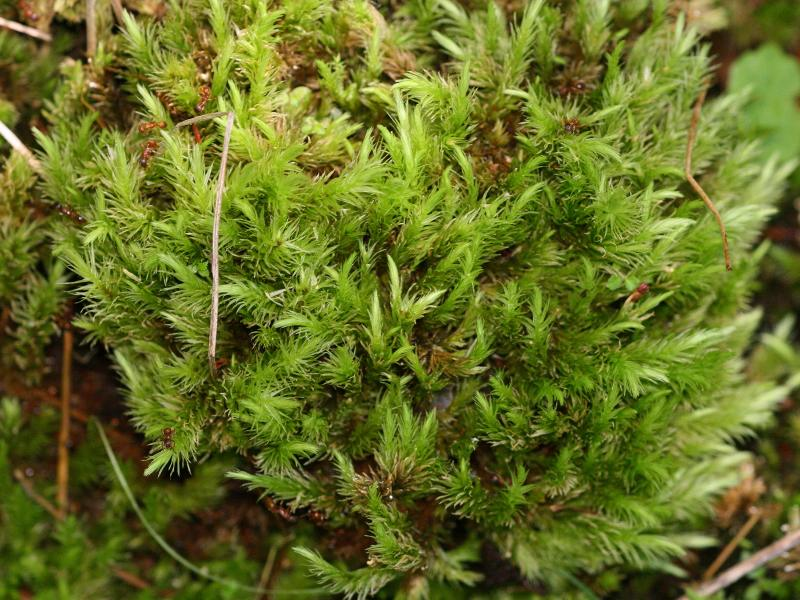
- Aulacomnium palustre

Scientific classification
- Kingdom: Plantae
- Division: Bryophyta
- Class: Bryopsida
- Subclass: Bryidae; Engl.

Orders
- Bryanae Bartramiales Bryales Hedwigiales Orthotrichales Rhizogoniales Splachnales Hypnanae Hookeriales Hypnales Hypnodendrales Ptychomniales

= Bryidae =

Subclass of mosses

Bryidae is an important subclass of Bryopsida. It is common all over the world. Members have a double peristome with alternating tooth segments.

== Classification ==
The two classifications of the Bryidae are:

Superorder: Bryanae

Bartramiales
Bryales
Hedwigiales
Orthotrichales
Rhizogoniales
Splachnales

Superorder: Hypnanae

Hypnodendrales
Ptychomniales
Hookeriales
Hypnales
