= List of studio potters =

This is a list of notable studio potters. A studio potter is one who is a modern artist or artisan, who either works alone or in a small group, producing unique items of pottery in small quantities, typically with all stages of manufacture carried out by themselves. Studio pottery includes functional wares such as tableware, cookware and non-functional wares such as sculpture. Studio potters can be referred to as ceramic artists, ceramists, ceramicists or as an artist who uses clay as a medium.

== Australian studio potters ==
- Gwyn Hanssen Pigott
- Gladys Reynell
- Ian Sprague
- Merric Boyd
- Una Deerbon
- Pippin Drysdale
- Warrick Palmateer
- Jan Dunn
- Milton Moon
- Marea Gazzard

== British studio potters ==
- Mo Abbaro
- Tim Andrews
- Dan Arbeid
- Gordon Baldwin
- Svend Bayer
- Dora Billington
- Clive Bowen
- Alan Caiger-Smith
- Michael Cardew
- Seth Cardew
- Michael Casson
- Bruce Chivers
- Kenneth Clark
- Nic Collins
- Joanna Constantinidis
- Emmanuel Cooper
- Waistel Cooper
- Hans Coper
- Jill and Peter Dick
- Jack Doherty
- Ken Eastman
- Elizabeth Fritsch
- Richard Godfrey
- Jane Hamlyn
- Lisa Hammond
- Mark Hewitt
- Vanessa Hogge
- Agnete Hoy
- Walter Keeler
- Gabriele Koch
- Bernard Leach
- David Leach
- Janet Leach
- Kate Malone
- John Maltby
- Martin Brothers
- Magdalene Odundo
- Colin Pearson
- Katherine Pleydell-Bouverie
- Lucie Rie
- Phil Rogers
- Katch Skinner
- Richard Slee
- Martin Smith
- Rupert Spira
- Julian Stair
- William Staite Murray
- Angus Suttie
- Marianne de Trey
- Judith Trim
- Edmund De Waal
- Peter Wright
- Takeshi Yasuda

== Canadian studio potters ==
- Kirsten Abrahamson
- Robert Archambeau
- Tony Clennell
- Kjeld Deichmann
- Erica Deichmann Gregg
- Alice Mary Hagen
- Enid Legros-Wise
- Marilyn Levine
- Jeannie Mah

== French studio potters ==
- Georges Jouve

== Hungarian studio potters ==
- Margit Kovács

== Japanese studio potters ==
- Eiraku Myōzen
- Keiko Fukazawa
- Shōji Hamada
- Kayoko Hoshino
- Kitamura Junko
- Keiko Masumoto
- Kimiyo Mishima
- Hisae Yanase
- Matsuda Yuriko

== New Zealand studio potters ==
- Nola Barron
- Doreen Blumhardt
- Barry Brickell
- Len Castle
- Katie Gold
- Peter Lange
- Helen Mason
- John Parker
- Richard Parker
- Patricia Charlotte Perrin
- Mirek Smíšek
- Peter Stichbury
- Merilyn Wiseman

== Nigerian studio potters ==
- Ladi Kwali

== South African studio potters ==
- Esias Bosch
- Andile Dyalvane
- Ian Garrett
- Eugene Hön
- Elizabeth Mbatha
- Nesta Nala
- Bonnie Ntshalintshali
- Zizipho Poswa
- Hyme Rabinowitz
- Clive Sithole

== Turkish studio potters ==
- Füreya Koral
- Tankut Öktem
- Jale Yılmabaşar

== United States studio potters ==
- Robert Arneson
- Rudy Autio
- Ralph Bacerra
- Bennett Bean
- Billy Al Bengston
- Sorcha Boru
- Mary Bowron
- Cynthia Bringle
- Rose Cabat
- Karita Coffey
- Dora De Larios
- Rupert Deese
- Chris Dagradi
- Ruth Duckworth
- Michelle Erickson
- Ken Ferguson
- Michael Frimkess
- Laura Ann Fry
- Melvino Garretti
- John Glick
- Chris Gustin
- Edith Heath
- Otto and Vivika Heino
- Wayne Higby
- Linna Vogel Irelan
- Stephen Jepson
- Danny Kaplan
- Karen Karnes
- Doyle Lane
- Cliff Lee
- Roberto Lugo
- Warren MacKenzie
- Kirk Mangus
- Karl Martz
- John Mason
- Harrison McIntosh
- Nan and Jim McKinnell
- Hideaki Miyamura
- Maria Longworth Nichols
- Richard Notkin
- George E. Ohr
- Winnie Owens-Hart
- Mark Pharis
- Henry Varnum Poor
- Kenneth Price
- Elsa Rady
- Don Reitz
- Frederick Hurten Rhead
- Daniel Rhodes
- M. C. Richards
- Adelaïde Alsop Robineau
- Adrian Saxe
- Peter Shire
- Overbeck Sisters
- Edwin Scheier
- Mary Scheier
- Norm Schulman
- Paul Soldner
- Rudolf Staffel
- Toshiko Takaezu
- Akio Takamori
- Jack Troy
- Robert C. Turner
- Peter Voulkos
- Marguerite Wildenhain
- Bruce Winn
- Beatrice Wood
- Betty Woodman
- Harris Deller

== See also ==
- American art pottery
- Studio pottery
