= Daniel Kaplan =

Dan, Daniel or Danny Kaplan may refer to:

- Daniel Kaplan (physicist) (born 1941), French physicist
- Daniel Kaplan (footballer) (born 1973), Czech soccer player
- Dan Kaplan (architect) (born 1961), American architect
- Danny Kaplan (born 1984), American artist
