= Joan Takayama-Ogawa =

Japanese-American ceramic artist

Joan Takayama–Ogawa
- Born: 1955 (age 70–71); Pasadena, California, United States
- Education: International Christian University, University of California, Los Angeles, Stanford University Graduate School of Education, Otis College of Art and Design
- Occupations: Visual artist, educator
- Known for: ceramic art, sculpture
- Website: https://joantakayamaogawa.com

Joan Takayama-Ogawa (born February 20, 1955), is an American ceramic artist and educator. She is sansei (third-generation) Japanese-American, and a professor at Otis College of Art and Design in Los Angeles, California. Takayama-Ogawa's heritage since the 15th century of Japanese ceramic art influences her work, that usually explores beauty, decoration, ornamentation and narrative while also introducing a dialogue that rejects the traditional role of women in Japanese culture.

== Early life and education ==
Takayama-Ogawa began her extensive education at the International Christian University, Tokyo, when she was just 20 years old. While there, she spent a year studying conversational Japanese and with an intent in learning more about her family's connection with Japanese ceramics. Here she was first introduced to Jōmon pottery by faculty member and expert, J. E. Kidder, which was the beginning of her “life long interest in archeology and geology.” She continued on to receive her Bachelor of Fine Arts in East Asian studies and geography from the University of California, Los Angeles (UCLA) in 1978. Then her Masters of Arts at the Stanford University Graduate School of Education in 1979, and finally her ceramics education at Otis College of Art and Design in Los Angeles in 1989. At Otis, Ogawa studied with Ralph Bacerra, chair of Otis's ceramic department. His teaching focused on material proficiency over concept, his emphasis on form, surface and finish directly influenced Ogawa's stylistic choices in her early ceramic work.

== Artist career and style ==
When Ogawa signed up for ceramics classes one summer, around the time when she was working as the Academic Dean at Crossroads School in Santa Monica, she discovered that her newly found creative outlet also connected to her personal history. She was previously aware that her mother's family in Osaka had donated an extensive collection of Japanese ceramics to the Los Angeles County Museum of Art in the 1960s. Including works by ceramicists Kenkichi Tomimoto and Kenzan Ogata. But now she discovered that her father's family has a well known history of ceramic production in Tokoname, Japan dating back to the 15th century. Judy Seckler notes in Ceramics Monthly, “Recollecting the Past”, “This talent for claywork lay dormant in her genes until it was given a chance to bubble up to the surface and lay the groundwork for her new life as a clay artist.” Not too long after, she realized her urge to work with clay had “escalated into an obsession,” she left her middle-school teaching career to pursue a future in the ceramic arts.

Takayama-Ogawa's early works are often in the form of a teapot and tea bowls, referencing the important tradition of tea ceremonies in Japan. Although in Elaine Levin's Ceramics Monthly article, she mentions, alongside Keiko Fukazawa, that “Both artists admit that they have vigorously resisted the narrow, traditional role of women in Japanese culture, yet the teapot and the tea bowl of the tea ceremony—forms that have an important relation to ceramics tradition, and to women and culture in Japan—have had a significant impact on the work of both.”

Takayama-Ogawa's more recent work has focused on climate change.

== Teaching career ==
After graduating from Stanford University, Takayama-Ogawa started her first position in education at the Crossroads School in Santa Monica, California in 1979, where she worked as faculty, as well as Academic Dean. until she decided to further her education at Otis College of Art and Design in 1985. That same year, she also transitioned to her current position at Otis as a Professor in Ceramics, Product Design, English and Public Speaking. In 2010, she was appointed Ceramics Coordinator, and she was in charge of “bringing clay back to Otis with a focus on 3D printing and clay”. Within that position in 2012, she has organized a corporate sponsored project with Gainey Ceramics, where students designed models to be manufactured and sold through Gainey. She has also organized three faculty development workshops for 2011 Clay in LA Symposium.

== Recognition ==
- 2017 73 Scripps Annual Artist Curator, Scripps College, Claremont, CA
- 2016 Pasadena Design Commissioner at AMOCA
- 2016 NCECA Speaker
- 2014 NCECA Speaker, Milwaukee and Kansas City
- 2014 One of the top 50 American Ceramics Artists by The Marks Project
- 2010 Otis College of Art and Design, Faculty Development Grant Laguna Clay Company, Lomitas, CA.
- 2006 Recipient of the Otis Faculty Development Grant
- Recipient of the Otis Faculty Technology Grant
- 2005 Artist in Residency, Watershed, Maine
- 2004 Teacher of the Year Commencement Speaker at Otis College of Art and Design
- 1994 Glading McBean and Co., "Feats of Clay," Merit Award," Lincoln, California.
- 1993 Renwick Gallery, Smithsonian Institution, "Workshop and Lecture Series," Washington D.C.
- 1978 UCLA President's Undergraduate Fellowship, researched the history of Little Tokyo.

== Permanent collections ==
- Smithsonian American Art Museum, Washington, D.C.
- Renwick Gallery, Smithsonian Institution, Washington, D.C.
- deYoung Museum, San Francisco
- Los Angeles County Museum of Art
- Oakland Museum of California
- Long Beach Museum of Art
- American Museum of Ceramic Art, Pomona, California
- Racine Art Museum
- World Ceramic Exposition Foundation, Icheon, South Korea
- Princessehof Leeuwarden Nationaal Keramiekmuseum, Leeuwarden, Netherlands
- George Ohr Museum, Biloxi, Mississippi
- Kamm Teapot Foundation
- David and Jackie Charak Foundation
- Hallmark Collection
- Celestial Seasoning Tea Company
- Newark Museum of Art, Newark, NY
- Stanford University Art Museum
- Flint Institute, Flint, Michigan
