= Palmateer =

Palmateer is a surname. Notable people with the surname include:

- Felicity Palmateer (born 1992), Australian surfer
- Mike Palmateer (born 1954), Canadian ice hockey player
- Warrick Palmateer (born 1969), Australian studio potter and art teacher
