= Notkin =

Notkin is a surname. Notable people with the surname include:

- David Notkin (1955–2013), software engineer
- Geoffrey Notkin (born 1961), author and meteorite hunter
- Richard T. Notkin (born 1948), ceramic artist
