= Adil Writer =

Indian ceramic artist, painter and architect

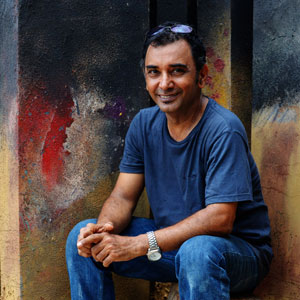
Adil Writer

Adil Writer is a ceramic artist, painter and architect from Bombay, India, currently living and working in Auroville universal township in south India. He is a partner at Mandala Pottery which produces functional tableware, assorted ceramic items, and architectural ceramic murals and installations. From his own studio at Mandala, he creates his own line of studio pottery.

Adil has had solo showings of his ceramics and paintings in Japan, Indonesia, Bombay, Delhi and Bangalore. Writer has organised residencies for groups of Indian artists in Fuping, China (2013) where works were made for the permanent collection of the FuLe Ceramic Art Museums, and Korea in 2014. An invited artist at Shigaraki Park in Japan and Gaya Ceramic Centre in Bali, he concluded his residencies with solo shows, “Secrets and Lies”. In 2015, he co-organised a soda firing workshop with Ruthanne Tudball in Auroville.

Adil studied pottery at Golden Bridge Pottery, Pondicherry, India, with Ray Meeker and Deborah Smith. He is a member of the International Academy of Ceramics, Geneva.
