= Clennell (surname) =

Clennell is an English surname.

Notable people with this surname include:

- Irene Clennell (born 1964), Singaporean citizen involved in a UK immigration case
- Joe Clennell (1889–1965), English footballer
- John Clennell (1772–1822), English journalist
- Luke Clennell (1781–1840), English engraver
- Paula Clennell, victim in the Ipswich serial murders
- Tony Clennell (born 1951), Canadian potter
