= Clennell =

Clenell may refer to:

- Clennell, Northumberland, England
- Clennell (surname) an English surname
- Clennell Wickham (1895-1938), West Indian journalist
