= Nick Collins (disambiguation) =

Nick Collins (born 1983) is an American former football player.

Nick or Nic Collins may also refer to:

- Nick Collins (composer) (born 1975), British academic and composer
- Nick Collins (politician) (born 1982), American politician in Massachusetts
- Nick Collins (English footballer) (1911–1990), English footballer
- Nic Collins (drummer), Swiss drummer
- Nic Collins (potter) (born 1958), British potter

== See also ==
- Nicolas Collins (born 1954), American electronic music composer
