= Lisa Hammond =

Lisa Hammond may refer to:

- Lisa Hammond (potter)
- Lisa Hammond (actress)
