= Stephon Alexander =

Theoretical physicist, musician

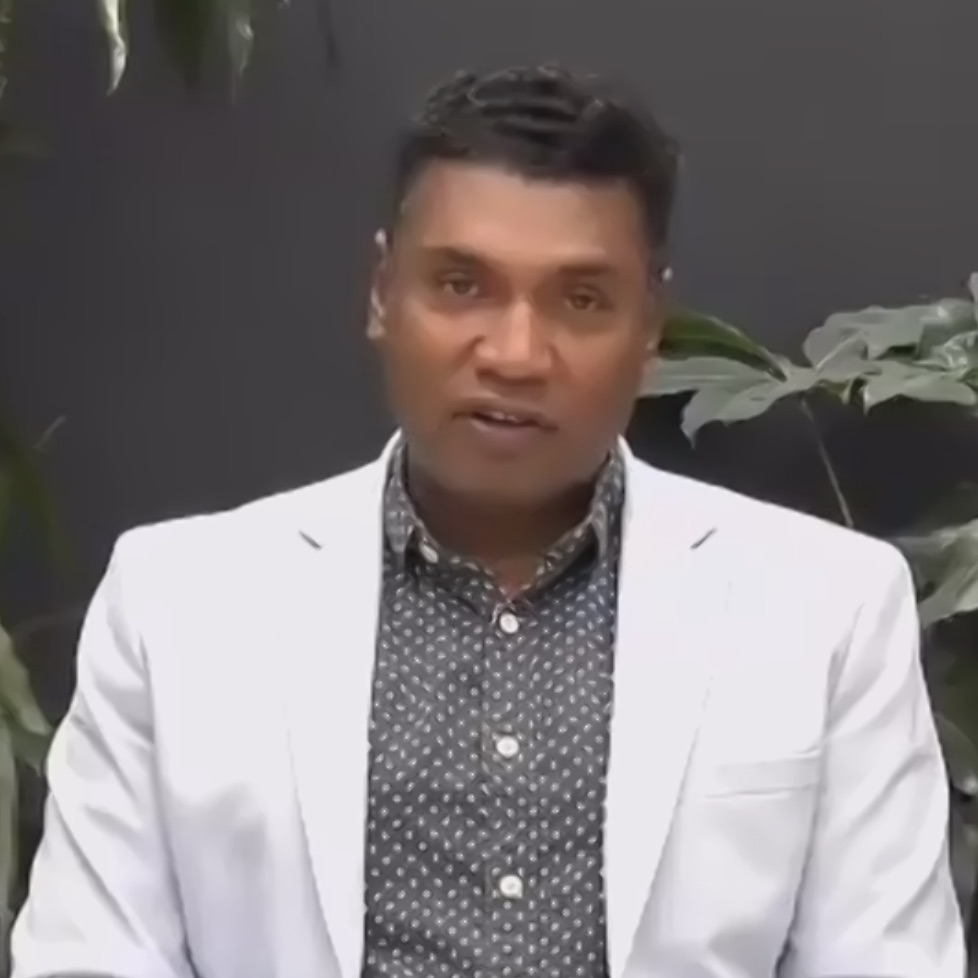
- Stephon Alexander at the online event "What can scientists learn from artists?"
- Born: Stephon Haigh-Solomon Alexander; March 30, 1971 (age 55); Princes Town, Trinidad and Tobago
- Occupations: Theoretical physicist, cosmologist, musician, author
- Notable work: The Jazz of Physics
- Awards: NSF Career Award, Edward A. Bouchet Award, AAAS John Wesley Powell Memorial Award
- Scientific career
- Thesis: Topological defects in alternative theories to cosmic inflation and string cosmology (2000)
- Doctoral advisor: Robert Brandenberger

Stephon Haigh-Solomon Alexander is an American theoretical physicist, cosmologist, author, and jazz musician. He is a professor of physics at Brown University and works at the intersection of cosmology, particle physics, and quantum gravity, with research involving string theory, loop quantum gravity, gravitational parity violation, and the physics of the early universe.

== Early life and education ==
Alexander was born in Trinidad and moved to the United States when he was eight. He grew up in the Bronx, New York City and attended DeWitt Clinton High School where his physics teacher Daniel Kaplan inspired him to study physics.

He received a B.S. in physics from Haverford College in 1993 and subsequently studied at Brown University, where he earned an Sc.M. in physics in 1995, an Sc.M. in electrical engineering in 1996, and a Ph.D. in physics in 2000. His doctoral adviser was Robert Brandenberger.

== Career ==
After receiving his doctoral degree, Alexander was a research physicist at Imperial College, London, as well as at the Stanford Linear Accelerator Center, Stanford University. Alexander has held faculty positions at Penn State, Haverford College, and Dartmouth College before joining the faculty at Brown University. Alexander was the president of the National Society of Black Physicists. He is also the executive director of Science and Arts Engagement New York Inc. (SAENY).

=== Academic life ===
Alexander was a postdoctoral researcher at Imperial College London from 2000 to 2002 and subsequently at the Stanford Linear Accelerator Center from 2002 to 2005. He joined Pennsylvania State University as an assistant professor of physics in 2005 and moved to Haverford College in 2008 as an associate professor. In 2012, he became the Ernest Everett 1907 Associate Professor of Natural Sciences at Dartmouth College.

Alexander returned to Brown University in 2016 as a professor of physics. He has also held visiting positions at Princeton University, the California Institute of Technology, ETH Zurich, the Perimeter Institute for Theoretical Physics, Columbia University, and the Center for Computational Astrophysics of the Simons Foundation. Brown lists his current research specialization as the interface between cosmology, particle physics, and quantum gravity, including string theory and loop quantum gravity.

He has served on the editorial board of the Journal of Cosmology and Astroparticle Physics and has taught courses in general relativity and cosmology, astrophysics and cosmology, quantum field theory, and quantum mechanics. He also advocates for historically under-represented groups in the sciences. He is a member of the editorial board of Universe.

== Research ==
Alexander's research concerns fundamental questions at the intersection of cosmology, particle physics and gravity. His work has addressed the early universe, cosmic inflation, dark matter, dark energy, black holes, gravitational waves, parity violation, and possible extensions of general relativity.

=== String cosmology and inflation ===
One of Alexander's early research areas was string cosmology, particularly the use of ideas from string theory to construct models of cosmic inflation. In a 2001 paper, Inflation from D-\bar{D} brane annihilation, he proposed a scenario in which the annihilation of D5 and anti-D5 branes produces a vortex localized on a three-brane, with its false-vacuum energy driving an inflationary phase. The model also provided a mechanism for ending inflation and localizing matter on the resulting brane.

His work in this area contributed to the development of models connecting higher-dimensional string theory with the dynamics of the early universe. Alexander is a co-inventor of a string-theory-based model of cosmic inflation developed in the early 2000s.

=== Quantum gravity and parity violation ===
A recurring theme in Alexander's research has been the possibility that quantum-gravitational effects could produce observable departures from general relativity. His work has examined parity violation—the distinction between physical processes under spatial reflection and its possible consequences for cosmology and gravitational phenomena.

In 2007, Alexander studied whether parity-violating modifications of general relativity could account for anomalies in the cosmic microwave background, including suppression of power at large angular scales and possible alignments in the low multipole moments of the WMAP data. The work also considered connections between parity violation and leptogenesis in the early universe.

His later research developed these ideas through Chern–Simons modifications of gravity. In work beginning more than a decade ago, he developed what has been termed dynamical Chern–Simons gravity, an extension of general relativity involving a coupling between a scalar field and the gravitational Chern–Simons term. The theory provides a framework for investigating possible deviations from general relativity in strong-gravity environments and has applications to black holes, cosmology and gravitational waves.

Alexander has subsequently studied the propagation of gravitational waves in parity-violating theories. A 2020 paper examined gravitational waves in parity-violating Copernican universes, while a 2024 Physical Review D paper with Tucker Manton investigated gravitational parity violation involving the Kalb–Ramond field and considered constraints from gravitational-wave observations, including GW170817 and the GWTC-3 catalog.

=== Dark matter, dark energy and the early universe ===
Alexander's research has also addressed the nature of the dark sector, including theoretical approaches to dark matter and dark energy. His work considers these problems in the context of the limitations of general relativity and the Standard Model. His research group has used theoretical, computational and conceptual methods, including machine learning, to investigate these questions.

He has also studied cosmic inflation, leptogenesis and the generation of matter-antimatter asymmetry in the early universe. His research has examined how parity-violating interactions could produce an imbalance between matter and antimatter and how such effects might leave signatures in cosmological observations.

=== Gravitational waves and cosmology ===
Alexander has investigated whether observations of gravitational waves can provide evidence for physics beyond general relativity. His research examines how parity-violating interactions could affect the polarization and propagation of gravitational waves and whether these effects could be distinguished through astrophysical observations. His work with collaborators has considered constraints from existing gravitational-wave data and possible future tests.

A 2021 Simons Foundation grant supported Alexander's research into modifications of general relativity, particularly approaches intended to address singularities associated with black holes and the Big Bang. The project examined whether an extension of Einstein's theory could provide a framework for understanding phenomena that remain unresolved within classical general relativity.

Interdisciplinary research

Alexander has also applied mathematical methods from theoretical physics to problems outside conventional cosmology. His research interests have included machine learning, signal processing, computational algorithms, and mathematical approaches to musical perception. At Brown, he has participated in STEMJazz, an interdisciplinary initiative connecting science, mathematics, engineering and music.

=== Media ===
In February 2013, Alexander wrote in The New York Times about the need for black academics to set a positive trend for the next generation. In the article, he called upon a number of personal experiences from his own education and life.

Alexander has been interviewed or quoted in media sources such as the Tavis Smiley Show, Forbes Magazine, NPR, Brian Lehrer Show, Science Salon/Skeptic Society, Downbeat Magazine, and Mercury News.

=== Music ===
His album with Rioux was Here Comes Now. Alexander and bassist Melvin Gibbs formed a group that they named God Particle. His first book, The Jazz of Physics: The Secret Link Between Music and the Structure of the Universe, was published by Basic Books in 2016. The book examines historical and conceptual connections between music, mathematics and physics, including the work of figures such as Pythagoras, Johannes Kepler, Albert Einstein and John Coltrane.

His second book, Fear of a Black Universe: An Outsider's Guide to the Future of Physics, was published by Basic Books in 2021. It discusses open problems in modern cosmology, including dark matter and dark energy, alongside Alexander's experiences as a physicist and his views on scientific creativity and diversity.

Alexander is also the author of The Jazz of Physics, a book that discusses the link between music and the structure of the universe.

On a Nova documentary, Alexander was featured discussing his life as a jazz saxophonist, while also working as a physicist during the day.

== Other works ==
Alexander founded Sound+Science, a nonprofit organization, and serves as its chief executive officer. The organization develops educational programs that combine music, science, and technology to introduce young people to STEM fields.

He also founded and directs the Caribbean Future of Science project, established in 2023 with support from the Simons Foundation through the University of the West Indies. The initiative aims to connect Caribbean researchers, members of the scientific diaspora, and the international scientific community through regional scientific activities.

== Awards ==
- 2024 Frantz Fanon Award, Caribbean Philosophical Association
- 2023 Isaac Asimov Science Award
- 2022 Fellow of the American Physical Society
- 2006 National Geographic Emerging Explorers
- 2008 NSF Career Award.
- 2010 AAAS John Wesley Powell Memorial Award.
- 2013 Edward A. Bouchet Award.
- 2012 Rudranath Capildeo National Medal for the Natural Sciences, Trinidad and Tobago.
- 2010 AAAS John Wesley Powell Memorial Award.
- 2009 National Academy of Sciences Frontiers of Science Alumni
- 2005 National Geographic Society Emerging Explorer
- 2002 Isaac Newton Institute Junior Fellow, University of Cambridge
- 2000–2002 Particle Physics and Astronomy Research Council Postdoctoral Fellowship, United Kingdom.
- NSF CAREER Award, National Science Foundation.

== Selected publications ==
- Alexander, Stephon; Brandenberger, Robert; Magueijo, João (2003-04-17). "Noncommutative inflation". Physical Review D. 67 (8) 081301. arXiv:hep-th/0108190. Bibcode:2003PhRvD..67h1301A. doi:10.1103/physrevd.67.081301. ISSN 0556-2821.
- Alexander, Stephon; Martin, Jérôme (2005-03-24). "Birefringent gravitational waves and the consistency check of inflation". Physical Review D. 71 (6) 063526. arXiv:hep-th/0410230. Bibcode:2005PhRvD..71f3526A. doi:10.1103/physrevd.71.063526. ISSN 1550-7998.
- Alexander, Stephon H. S.; Peskin, Michael E.; Sheikh-Jabbari, M. M. (2006-02-27). "Leptogenesis from Gravity Waves in Models of Inflation". Physical Review Letters. 96 (8) 081301. arXiv:hep-th/0403069. Bibcode:2006PhRvL..96h1301A. doi:10.1103/physrevlett.96.081301. ISSN 0031-9007. PMID 16606163.
- Alexander, Stephon; Yunes, Nicolás (2007-06-27). "Parametrized post-Newtonian expansion of Chern-Simons gravity". Physical Review D. 75 (12) 124022. arXiv:0704.0299. Bibcode:2007PhRvD..75l4022A. doi:10.1103/physrevd.75.124022. ISSN 1550-7998.
- Alexander, Stephon; Yunes, Nicolas (2007-12-10). "New Post-Newtonian Parameter to Test Chern-Simons Gravity". Physical Review Letters. 99 (24) 241101. arXiv:hep-th/0703265. Bibcode:2007PhRvL..99x1101A. doi:10.1103/physrevlett.99.241101. ISSN 0031-9007. PMID 18233434.
- Alexander, Stephon; Yunes, Nicolás (2008-06-24). "Chern-Simons modified gravity as a torsion theory and its interaction with fermions". Physical Review D. 77 (12) 124040. arXiv:0804.1797. Bibcode:2008PhRvD..77l4040A. doi:10.1103/physrevd.77.124040. ISSN 1550-7998.
- Alexander, Stephon; Finn, Lee Samuel; Yunes, Nicolás (2008-09-11). "Gravitational-wave probe of effective quantum gravity". Physical Review D. 78 (6) 066005. arXiv:0712.2542. Bibcode:2008PhRvD..78f6005A. doi:10.1103/physrevd.78.066005. ISSN 1550-7998.
- Alexander, Stephon; Yunes, Nicolás (August 2009). "Chern–Simons modified general relativity". Physics Reports. 480 (1–2): 1–55. arXiv:0907.2562. Bibcode:2009PhR...480....1A. doi:10.1016/j.physrep.2009.07.002. ISSN 0370-1573.
- Alexander, Stephon; Creque-Sarbinowski, Cyril (2023-11-22). "UV completions of Chern-Simons gravity". Physical Review D. 108 (10) 104046. Bibcode:2023PhRvD.108j4046A. doi:10.1103/physrevd.108.104046. ISSN 2470-0010.
- Alexander, Stephon; Gilmer, Humberto; Manton, Tucker; McDonough, Evan (2023-12-08). "𝜋-axion and 𝜋-axiverse of dark QCD". Physical Review D. 108 (12) 123014. American Physical Society. arXiv:2304.11176. Bibcode:2023PhRvD.108l3014A. doi:10.1103/PhysRevD.108.123014.
- Alexander, Stephon; Bernardo, Heliudson; Kuntzleman, Jacob; Pezzelle, Max (2026-08-28). "Quantum gravity, de Sitter space, and normalizability". Classical and Quantum Gravity. 43 (16): 165025. arXiv:2511.05417. Bibcode:2026CQGra..43p5025A. doi:10.1088/1361-6382/ae9819. ISSN 0264-9381.
