= Chipstone Foundation =

- Location: 7820 North Club Circle Milwaukee, Wisconsin 53217
- Director: Jonathan Prown
- Website: www.chipstone.org

The Chipstone Foundation is a Wisconsin-based foundation dedicated to promoting American decorative arts scholarship. Originating from the private collection of Stanley and Polly Stone, the foundation uses its objects and resources to support decorative arts projects and publications at other institutions, seeking to find "newer ways to look at old things.".

Cataloging Chipstone's collection: In 1984 Chipstone published a book by Oswaldo Rodriguez Roque, American Furniture at Chipstone. As the title suggests this publication catalogs the American Furniture that the Stones had collected up to that point with two essays, one by Stanley Stone. The other catalogs styles from 1680 to 1820.

In 1999, the Chipstone Foundation partnered with the Milwaukee Art Museum, thereby making many of Chipstone's significant holdings on view for public display.

An exhibit at the Milwaukee Art Museum Chipstone Galleries calls out the fake furniture, The truth Lies Within, that was sold to the Stones and shows how antique dealers would fool unsuspecting buyers of high priced antique objects. The exhibit has examples of furniture with upholstery removed to show construction comparisons of real antiques verses ones that have been faked. The Chipstone Foundation owns many true antique historic objects in spite of the original collectors being swindled but this exhibit uses the fake examples to educate the public on how objects and our eyes can be manipulated.

The Chipstone Foundation publishes two significant annual scholarly journals: American Furniture and Ceramics in America. The foundation also has an association with the University of Wisconsin–Madison. Together they created an academic program that explores multiple approaches to the study of American material culture by bringing together scholars from other departments at the university, including history, art, African studies, design, and literature.

In 2012, the foundation, in conjunction with the Victoria & Albert Museum, funded ceramic artist Michelle Erickson during her artist in residence work in London at the V& A. They have continued to engage contemporary artists to create works and respond to their collection in new and interesting ways.

April 1, of 2022, Chipstone launched a new quarterly publication series on materials. Material Intelligence, Each issue highlight a specific material used to make or in the making of objects we use in everyday life and or the history of the material and what it has been used for in history. The publication is an online publication with a possibility of becoming a small edition of the issues in print.

Material Intelligence is a digital magazine that celebrates the human capacity to understand and shape the physical world around us. Each issue takes a deep dive into one commonplace material with contributors who come from every discipline and walk of life. Together, the stories they tell illuminate vital, at times unexpected connections: between art and science, history and contemporary life, the tangible and the intangible. Material Intelligence is published by the Chipstone Foundation.
