= Pippin Drysdale =

Australian ceramic artist

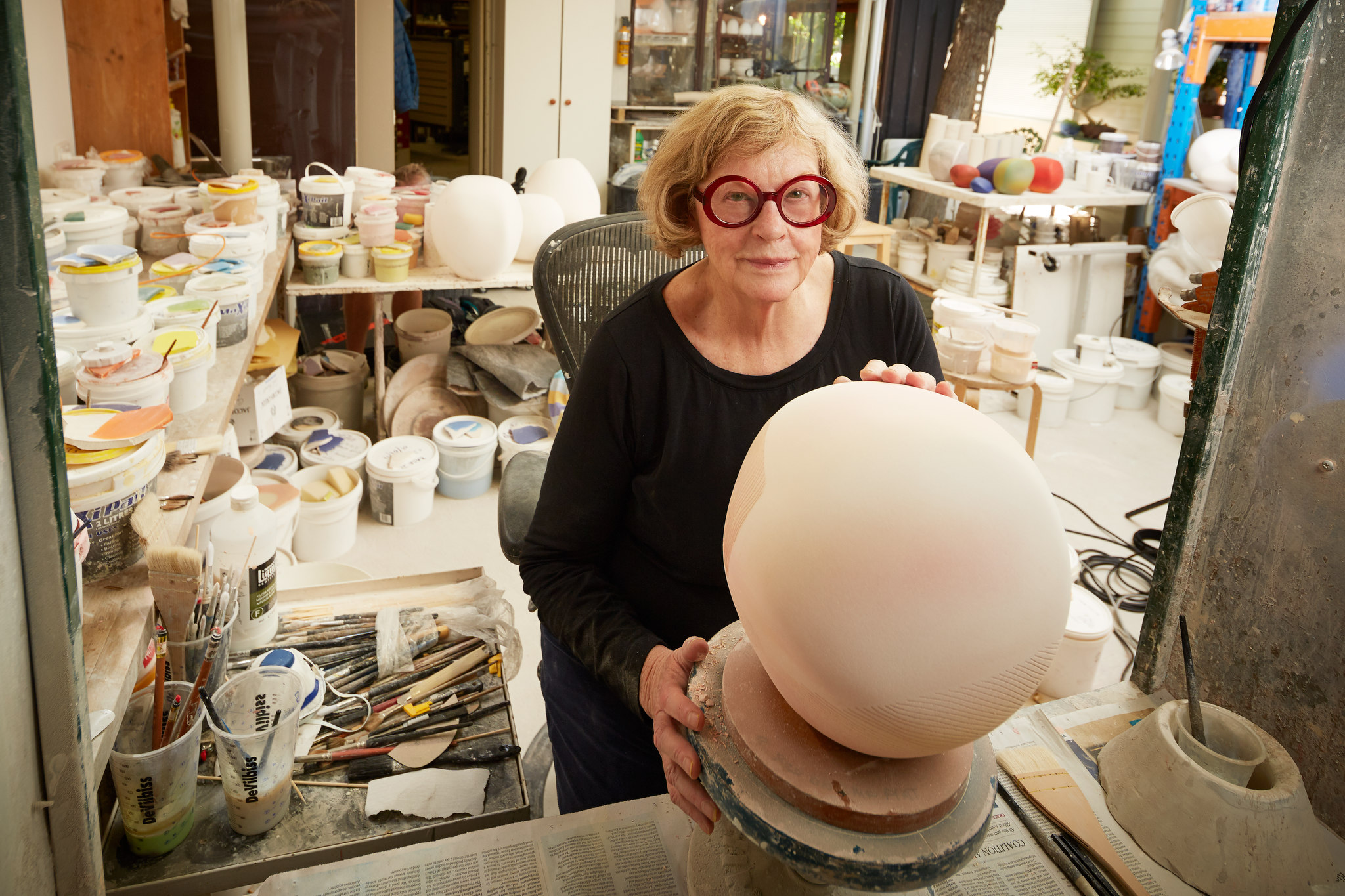
- Born: Pippin Louise Carew-Reid; 18 May 1943 (age 83); Toorak, Melbourne, Australia
- Education: Curtin University
- Known for: Ceramic art
- Style: Modernism, Abstract expressionism
- Website: pippindrysdale.com

Pippin Drysdale (born 18 May 1943) is an Australian ceramic artist and art teacher. She is regarded as the foremost interpreter of the Australian landscape in the field of ceramics. Her works are known for their intensity of colour and linear markings that interpret the artist's relationship with the Australian landscape. She was recognized as one of Western Australia’s State Living Treasures in 2015. She is Australia's highest earning ceramicist.

== Biography ==
Drysdale was born in SydneyMelbourne in 1943 into a wealthy family, and grew up in Perth from the age of three. Her father, John Hastings "Bunny" Carew-Reid, was a successful businessman and real estate developer. As a teenager she had art lessons from William Boissevain. At school, she excelled at art, but struggled with other subjects due to an undiagnosed vision problem that, although eventually discovered and corrected at age 12, set her on a rebellious course during her formative years. She failed her Junior Certificate at Methodist Ladies' College, Perth. After leaving school, she attended a business college, from which she was expelled, and then a technical college, where she failed all subjects. She then worked for a short stint at her father's company as a typist, then as a secretary in Canberra, then worked odd jobs in England for a year, and traveled throughout Europe. Returning to Australia in the early 1960s, she moved to Melbourne, married Christopher Drysdale in 1967 (divorced in 1972), and had a son, Jason. In Melbourne she began selling art (Mexican paper flowers sold as "Pip’s Flowers"). She returned to Fremantle, Perth in the 1970s, and started a successful business selling herbs. Through a relationship with a potter who made ceramic structures for her herbs, Drysdale first discovered clay. That led to an Advanced Diploma in Ceramics at Western Australia School of Art and Design in 1982, followed by a 1982 trip to America where she studied with Daniel Rhodes and Toshiko Takaezu at the Anderson Ranch Art Center. Rhodes encouraged her to further her education at university level; Takaezu told her to ignore traditions and create her own sensibilities and techniques to suit her own environment. Returning to Australia, Drysdale obtained a Bachelor of Arts (Fine Art) at Curtin University in 1986.

After graduating, she worked and studied at Grazia Deruta Majolica Pottery, the Artists’ Union of Russia, Tomsk State University and Banff Centre for Arts and Creativity.

== Career ==
Drysdale is a painter, a colourist, whose chosen canvases are ceramics. She draws inspiration from the landscapes of Australia’s vast desert country. Places that inspire her include the Pilbara, the Eastern Goldfields-Esperance area, the Kimberley and Tanami Desert, as well as landscapes in Pakistan, India, Russia and Italy. She is stimulated by the colours and textures of landscape, putting her emotional interpretations into her work. Drysdale has taught ceramic art in Australia, Canada, UK, Italy and Russia. In 2007 she was awarded a Master of Craft, from Craft Australia, New South Wales and in 2015 the Government of Western Australia conferred on her the Living Treasure Award.

=== Early career ===
Drysdale went from an initial period of throwing bowls to making slab plates that she used as canvases for expressionistic drawing with coloured slips, glazes, and resists. She cites Willem de Kooning as an early influence. Her early work is notable for eschewing the "brown sauce" that often douses craft pottery in favour of "complex colours and nervous decoration".

=== Maturity ===
Moving from slab plates to thrown vessels, Drysdale still retained her spontaneous style of decoration. She likes pure, simple forms where the forms do not intrude on the canvas-like aspects of the vessel. After residencies in Europe, the USA and Russia, during which she learned about majolica decoration and lustres, she produced the Totem and Carnivale series. Supported by one of many Australia Council grants awarded to her, Drysdale was able to study lustres in depth, producing the Over The Top series, full of rich gold and platinum lustres.

Western Australia inspired the series Landscape Lustre (1994), Pinnacles (1995) and Eastern Goldfields. At this time Drysdale started a collaboration with master potter Warrick Palmateer, allowing her to concentrate on surface art while he threw the vessels.

This glaze and lustre period reached its apogee in the Pakistan series, where multiple, liberal layers of glaze were followed each time by dousing in paraffin wax, scraping back, and filling.

=== Late period ===
Drysdale moved from the toxicity of waxes and lustres to the much safer Liquitex medium, which also allowed her to further refine her line work.

A 1998 airplane flight Drysdale took over northern Australia stands out to her as a key turning point. Flying low over Australia's Great Sandy Desert and the Tanami Desert, she was deeply impressed by the endless lines of parallel sand dunes stretching to the horizon, and their repetitive interplay of shadow and light. The linearity of her work also echoes the exposed rock strata everywhere to be seen in Australian deserts, so that truly "her ceramics are grounded in the tonal and linear patterns of the land". She was also influenced by indigenous painting (she owns works by indigenous artists Queenie McKenzie and Kitty Kantilla) and painter Fred Williams. McKenzie's influence can be seen in the serried, stacked segments of landscape that recede to the horizon line, and Kantilla's influence is clearly evident in the motif of parallel, slanting or vertical lines within these landscape segments.

Coalescing all these influences and ideas together, Drysdale arrived at her signature style of intense colour and fine linework in the first Tanami series called Red Desert (Frankfurt, 2003), which was a great success. Her technique encompasses the selection of a suitable vessel, the adding the layers of glaze, then the careful linear incisions with a knife through a masking resist to inscribe the tracery that defines and shapes each work. Because the masking medium quickly dries into a form too hard to inscribe, Drysdale can work only on one small section at a time. The inscribed lines are then brushed out and filled with thickly applied colour, and the excess colour is removed.

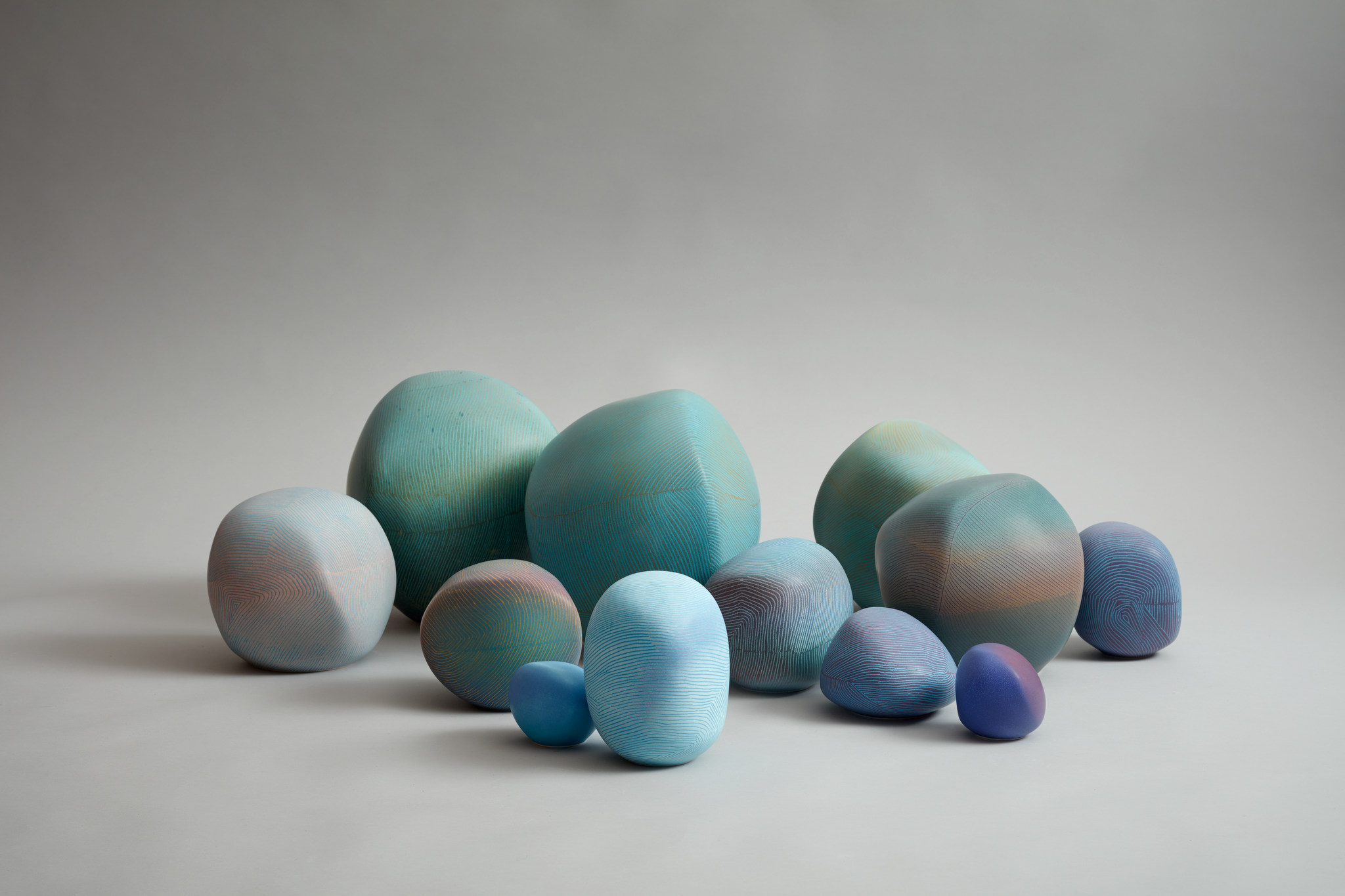
Installation of 2018 work inspired by Devils Marbles by Pippin Drysdale

Another feature of Drysdale's later oeuvre are her assemblages of asymmetrical pieces, suites of closed forms that echo geological features of Australia, such as the Devils Marbles series, inspired by the Karlu Karlu / Devils Marbles Conservation Reserve in the Northern Territory.

Drysdale finds constant renewal of self in the creative process, dating back to her earliest contact with clay:

Finally, I decided to take up clay. I can't believe that I'm still sitting here today, committed to clay. I finally found something that I thought was going to be a life time thing. I think the thing about being a ceramic artist, a potter, is that you are constantly learning and are challenged by it so you never get bored. You're just constantly extending yourself in lots of ways.

=== Studio ===
Drysdale's studio for the last 30 years has been her home in the port of Fremantle, a worker's cottage, now heavily renovated, bought for her by her father. Her pottery is thrown by Warrick Palmateer, a fellow Curtin graduate. She has a studio team of helpers to do the glaze mixing, colour testing, firing, bisque-ware sanding, internet work and shipping of work. The porcelain clay is pugged multiple times, wrapped to "sweat" for four weeks, then repugged before use.

=== Collections ===
Drysdale's works are found in many private collections. She is represented in Australia by Sabbia Gallery. The 12th Duke of Devonshire, Peregrine Cavendish, has a large collection (over 100) of Drysdale's works.

Her work is represented in the collections of the National Gallery of Australia, Art Gallery of Western Australia, Powerhouse Museum, Auckland Art Gallery, Queensland Art Gallery, Tasmanian Museum and Art Gallery, Museum and Art Gallery of the Northern Territory, National Museum of Scotland, Museum of Fine Arts, Gifu, Tomsk State Gallery and Museum, Novosibirsk State Art Museum, as well as in the Victoria and Albert Museum ceramic collection, London.

== Honours ==
- Western Australia’s State Living Treasures in 2015
- Lifetime Achievement Award — Artsource Australia
- Major Fellowship Grant from Australia Council for the Arts in 2007

== Gallery ==
=== Early work ===
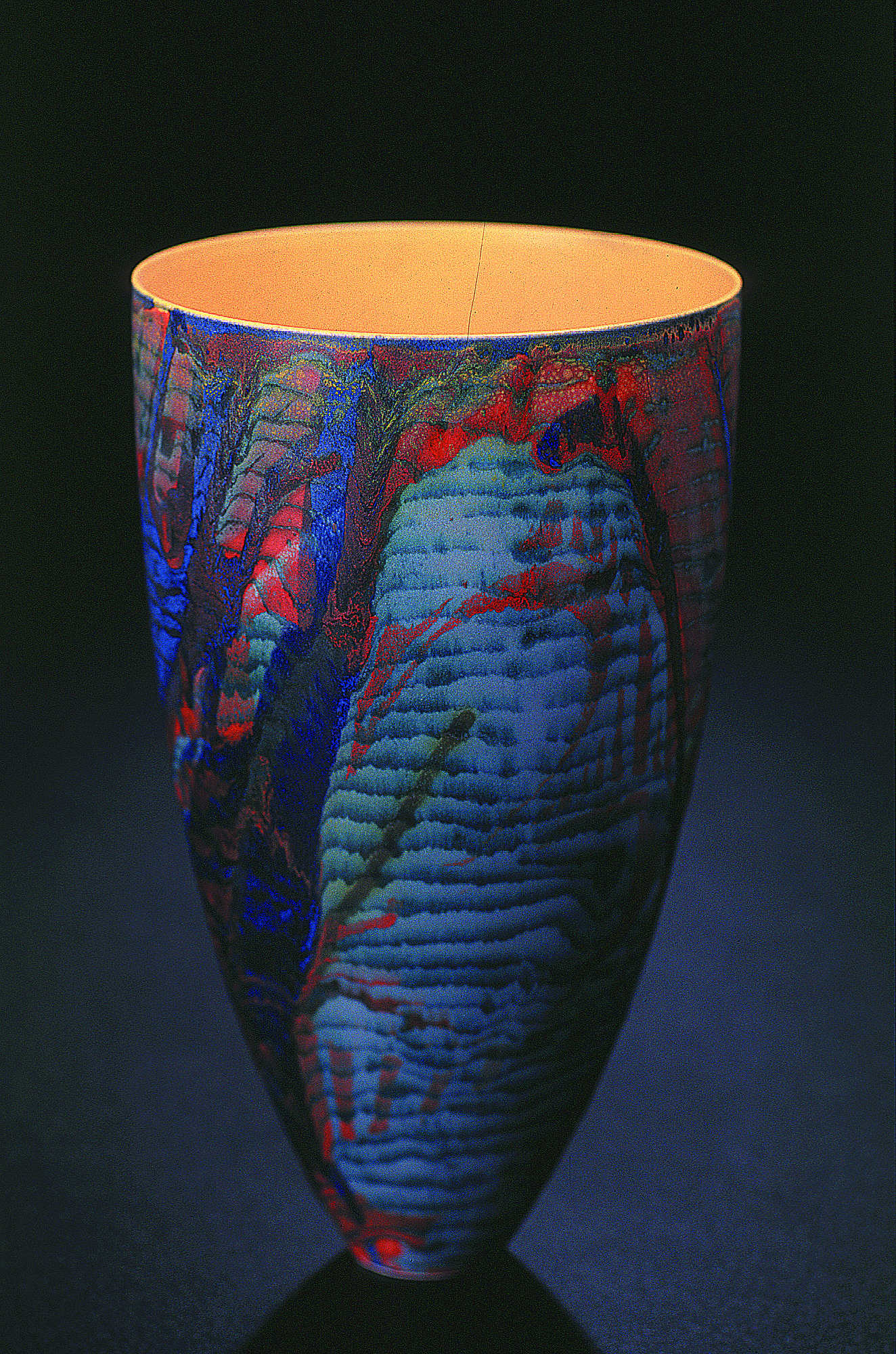
Ceramic vessel

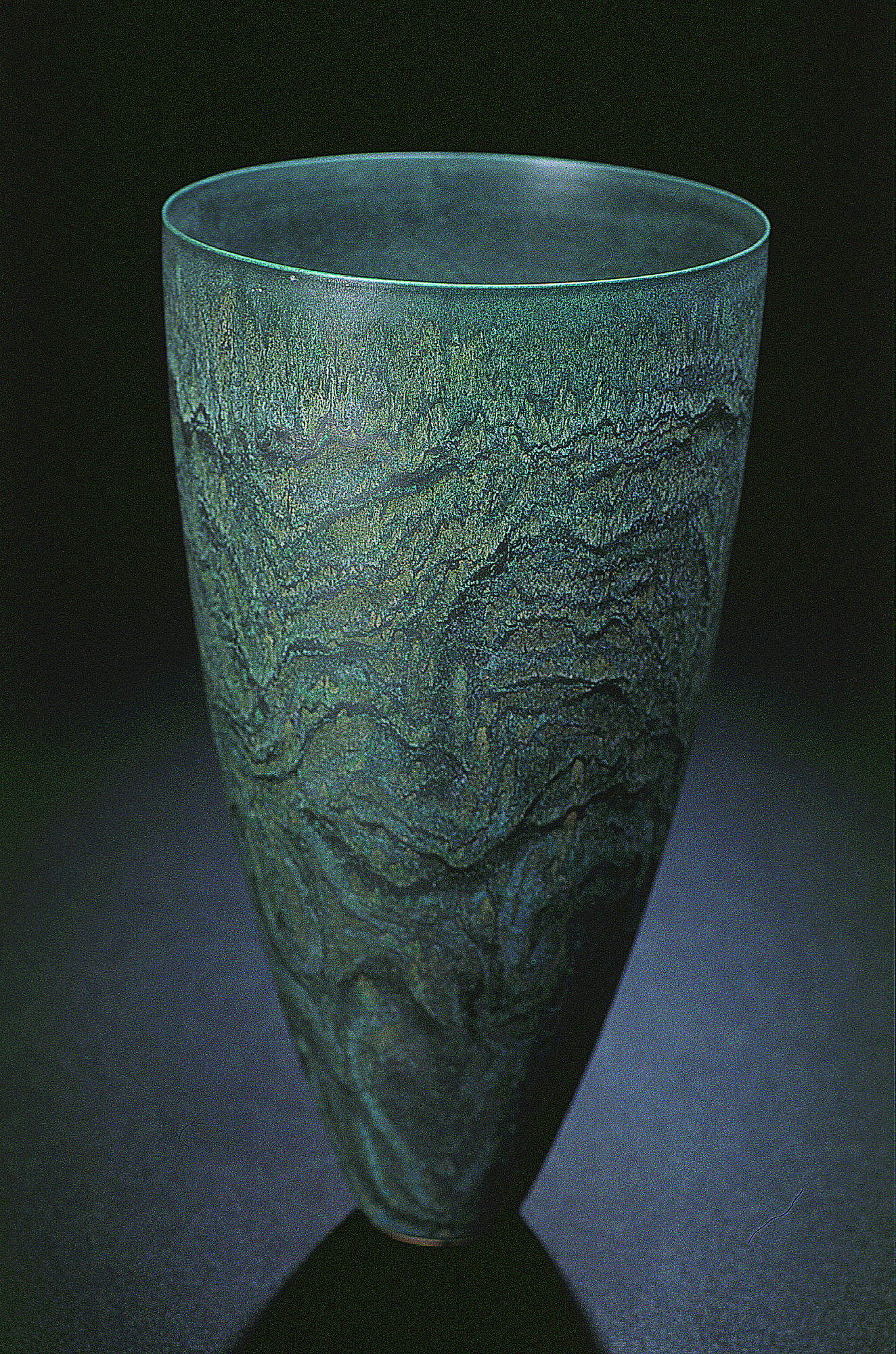
Green ceramic vessel

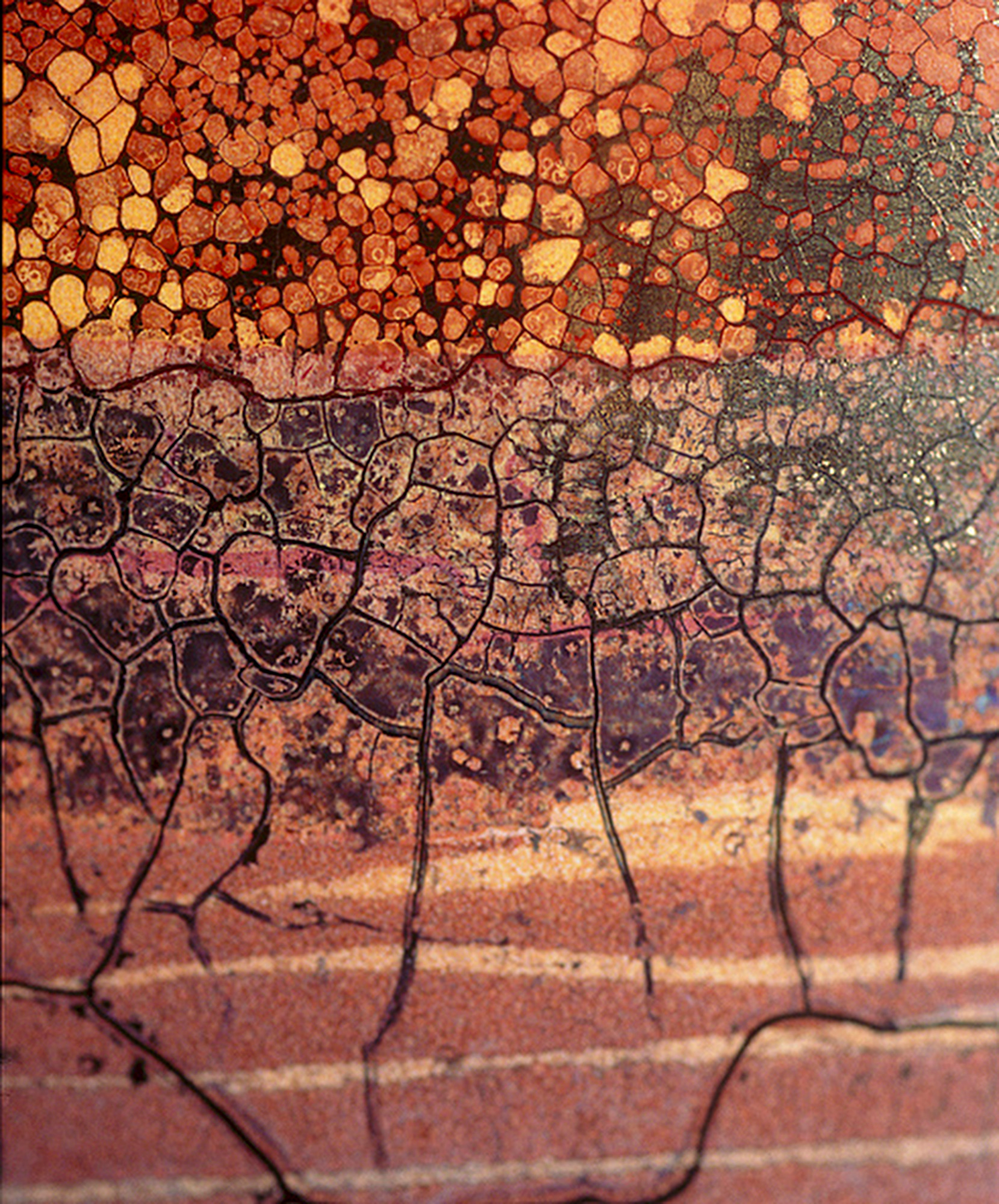
Detail of gold lustre vessel

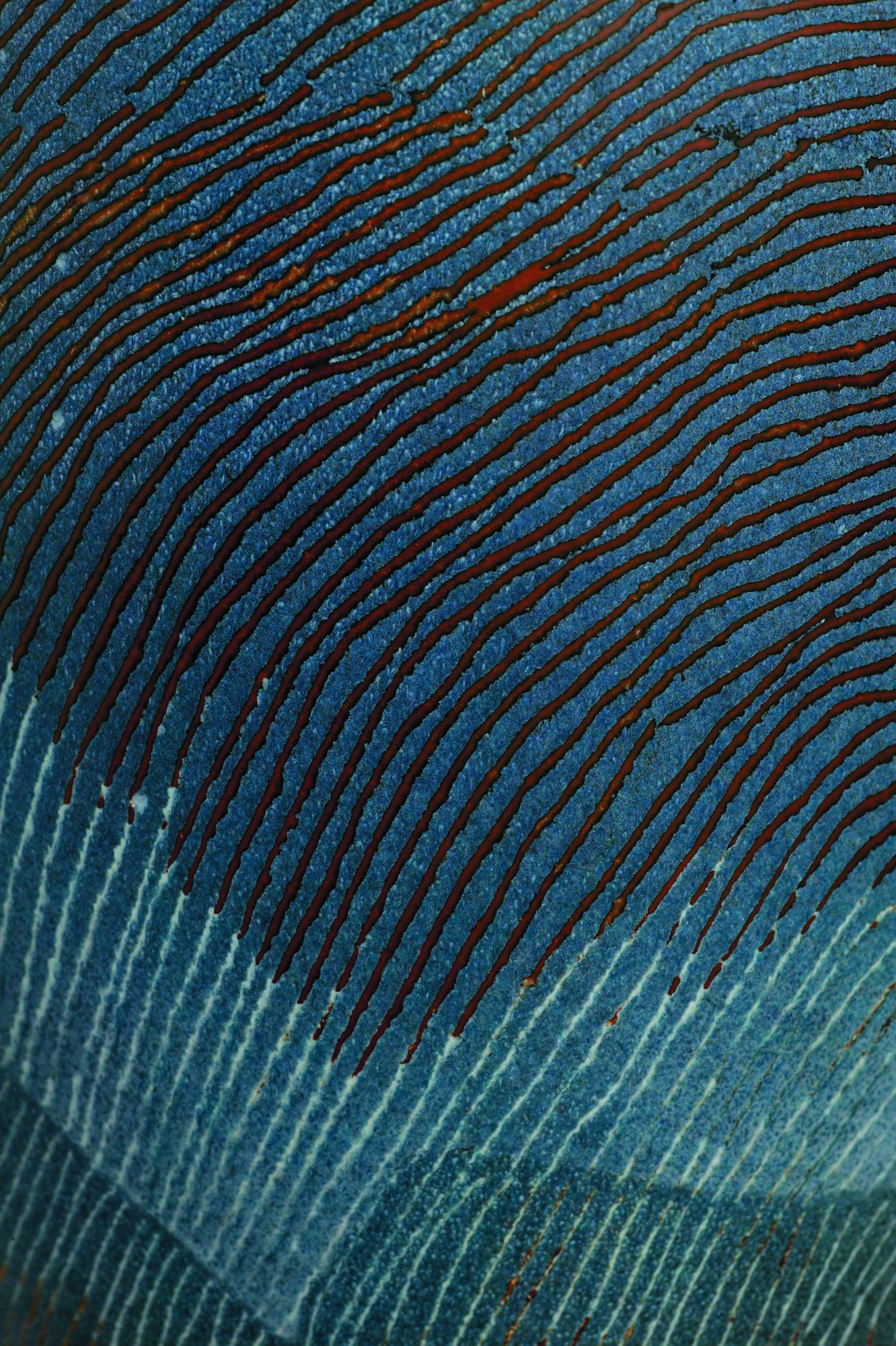
Ceramic vessel glaze detail

Tanami Traces installation

== See also ==
- Australian art

== Notes ==
=== References ===
- Snell, Ted (2007). Pippin Drysdale: Lines of Site. Fremantle Press. ISBN 978-1-92073-119-9.
