= Linna Vogel Irelan =

German-born US potter, writer (1846–1935)

- Born: Linna Vogel von Fogelstein; 1846; Germany
- Died: 1935 (aged 88–89)
- Occupations: potter; author
- Spouse(s): William Irelan, Jr. (m. 1870)
- Children: 1 son
- Relatives: Otto von Bismarck (greatuncle)

Linna Vogel von Fogelstein Irelan (née, Vogel von Fogelstein; 1846–1935) was a German-born American potter and author. She was the first woman to work in pottery in California who only used California materials.

== Early life ==
Linna Vogel von Fogelstein was born in 1846. She was a daughter of Col. Guido Alexander Vogel von Fogelstein, and a great-niece of Otto von Bismarck. Her ancestors were among the founders of the University of Leipzig in the year 1550.

== Career ==
On November 14, 1870, in Leipzig, Germany, she married William Irelan, Jr., a mining and consulting engineer. They had one son, Oscar.

They subsequently came to California, where William's parents had removed in the meantime, and William became here engaged in mining and scientific research. He also conducted a school in mining chemistry, metallurgy and kindred sciences.

She worked the clays of California and established the first art pottery, manufacturing the first wares of the kind west of Ohio. She won gold medals in exhibitions under the name of the Roblin Art Pottery and had an extensive knowledge of pottery wares and manufacture. She was acknowledged as a pioneer in this line of industrial art in the American west. Irelan had an inherited taste and talent for her work in pottery lines from a knowledge of the fact that her ancestors were the founders of the Royal Meissen China Works of Saxony.

As an artist in oils and water colors, she attained distinction, receiving the highest awards at the California state and other state exhibitions for her still-life paintings. She was also the first to introduce the leather plasticque or modeled leather which was favored in the European centers and in the United States.

Ireland's writings included a work on the use of clays and the manufacture of pottery in California, and she was a frequent contributor to many of the leading magazines upon the subject of her specialty. Her writings were not confined entirely to pottery, but also covered many scientific subjects, including a paper on the World's Geological Society and the Society of Natural and Applied Sciences of Europe.

== Death ==
Linna Vogel Irelan died in 1935.

== See also ==
- Notable US studio potters
