= Hisae Yanase =

Japanese sculptor (1943–2019)

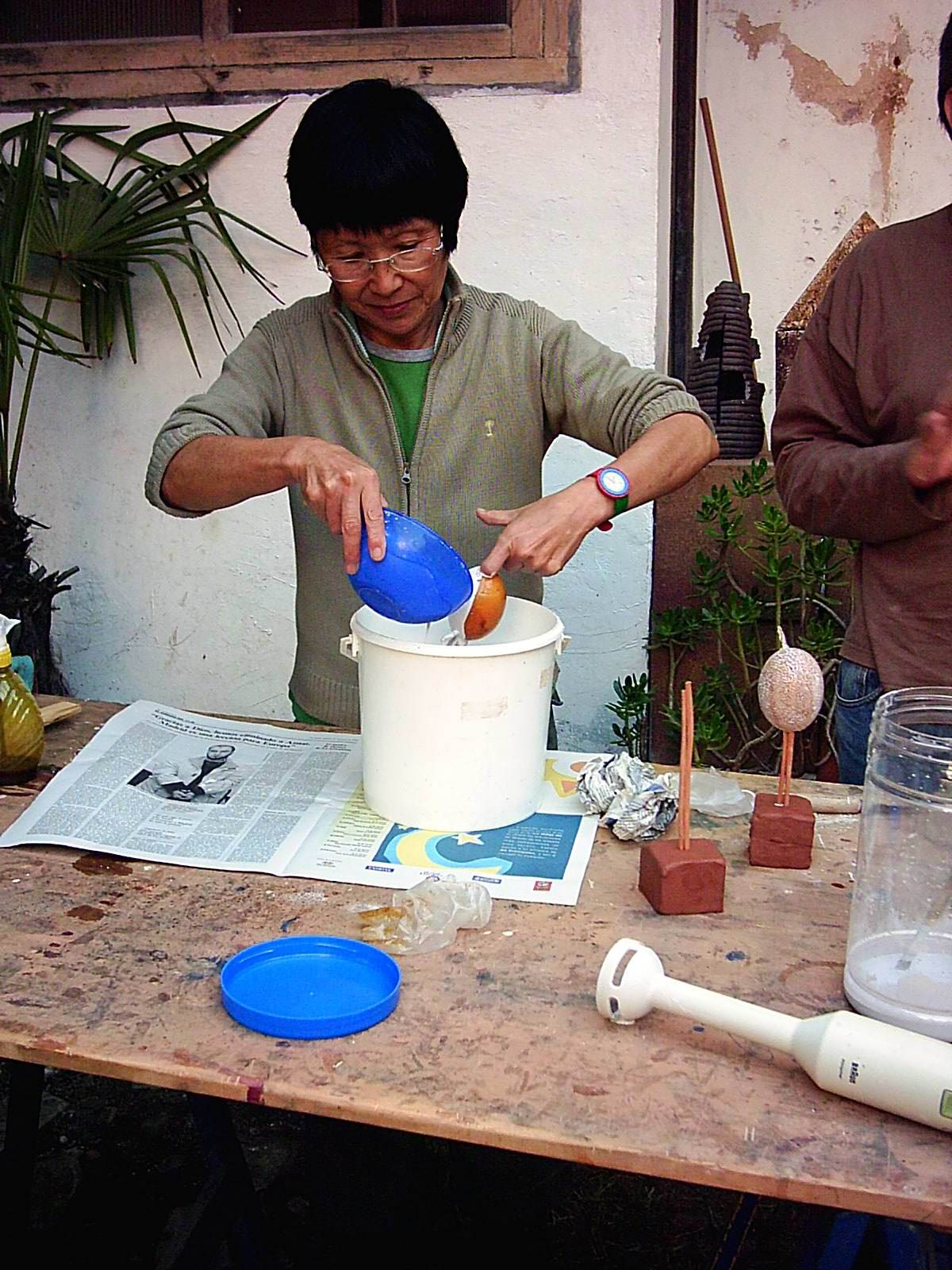
- Born: December 8, 1943; Chiba, Japan
- Died: May 21, 2019 (aged 75); Córdoba, Spain
- Known for: Ceramic arts

Hisae Yanase (December 8, 1943 – May 21, 2019) was a Japanese ceramist, painter, and sculptor, based in Spain. She spent the majority of her adult years in Córdoba, Spain, where she trained in ceramics and developed her career as an artist and instructor. She was considered an innovator of contemporary ceramics, fusing Japanese, Spanish, and Caliphate of Córdoba styles.

== Biography ==
Yanase was born in a remote region of Chiba, Japan on December 8, 1943, and grew up in Tokyo. She attended Bunka College in Tokyo, graduating in 1960 with a degree in design. In 1964, she completed an apprenticeship in leather techniques in Tokyo.

In 1968, at age 23, she travelled to Córdoba, as she had a friend moving to the city and an interest in cordovan leather. Her artistic interests shifted to ceramic art, which she studied in Valencia and Manises. In 1976, she began working as a ceramic teacher at the Mateo Inurria School of Arts and Crafts in Córdoba. She taught for 35 years before retiring in 2011.

In the 1980s, Yanase developed an interest in the pottery of the Caliphate of Córdoba. She developed a relationship with the nearby archaeological site, Medina Azahara, and conducted research on the pottery of the Caliphate, incorporating elements of the style into her own work. In 2015, her piece, Kuchu No Ako, was installed at the Medina Azahara museum.

Yanase participated in a number of solo exhibitions throughout her career, both in Spain (in Córdoba, Madrid, Málaga, and Seville) and internationally (including Pusan National University, Korea, and Fukuoka Art Gallery, Japan). She participated in group exhibitions in Spain and internationally, including shows at Kaohsiung Museum in Taiwan and the Cervantes Institutes in Japan, Belgium, and Morocco. Her works are part of collections in Japan, Switzerland, and Italy.

Yanase designed a monument to Juan Díaz de Moral in Bujalance; she also designed the poster for the 2016 May Festival. In 2015, she received a heritage award for her contributions to the central district of Córdoba.

Yanase lived in Córdoba with her husband, artist Antonio I. González. She died on May 21, 2019, after a sudden illness.
