= Deichmann pottery =

Canadian studio pottery

Deichmann pottery was studio pottery produced by Kjeld and Erica Deichmann in New Brunswick, Canada, from 1935 to 1963. Until 1956 their studio was located in rural Summerville on the Kingston Peninsula near Saint John, New Brunswick. In 1956 it was moved to Sussex, New Brunswick, where it operated until Kjeld Deichmann's death in 1963. The Deichmanns were Canada's first studio potters.

== Origin and early years ==
Kjeld Deichmann and Erica Matthiesen, who were both of Danish origin, met in Canada. Kjeld Deichmann was born in Copenhagen in 1900 and earned a degree in philosophy at the University of Copenhagen in 1919 before spending several years studying painting and sculpture in various European cities. He immigrated to Canada in 1928 and worked on a friend's ranch in Alberta. Erica Matthiesen, who was thirteen years younger than Deichmann, was the daughter of a Lutheran minister living in Edmonton. They were married in Saint John, New Brunswick, in 1932 and moved to the Kingston Peninsula, where Kjeld had purchased a farm.

Disillusioned with farming, and having found clay on their property, they spent the year beginning in May 1933 in Europe, where Kjeld studied pottery and Erica weaving. Kjeld spent several months helping the Danish potter Axel Brüel build a kiln, keeping notes about the project. When the Deichmanns returned to Canada they set up a pottery studio on their rural property, using Kjeld's notes as the basis for construction of the wood-burning kiln. Built of fire brick imported from Scotland, it had a capacity of 30 cubic feet (0.85 m^{3}) and a firing time of 20 to 40 hours. Their first firing, in August 1935, was unsuccessful as the pottery, made from clay dug on their own property, warped in the kiln. They continued to experiment with clays and firing temperatures, and in 1937 they produced their first salable pottery. The Deichmanns were Canada's first studio potters.

== Dykelands ==
The Deichmanns called their pottery studio Dykelands because there were several small dykes on their property. They divided the labour between them, with Kjeld using a potter's wheel to throw the pots and operating the kiln, while Erica developed and mixed the glazes, painted the pottery and decorative tiles, and sculpted fanciful animal figurines which she called "goofi".

The Deichmanns became part of a circle of artists and poets, including Miller Brittain, Jack Humphrey, Louis Muhlstock, Pegi Nicol MacLeod, P. K. Page, and Kay Smith, who visited them at Dykelands. Early and influential patrons were the historian John Clarence Webster and his wife, who purchased Deichmann works for their personal collection and for the New Brunswick Museum. Local people and tourists also visited the studio in increasing numbers, purchasing work directly from the Deichmanns and providing "a major source of income".

The rural and picturesque lifestyle of the Deichmanns and their three children attracted media attention and they appeared in "countless articles featuring photography by Yousuf Karsh and Richard Harrington". The National Film Board made two documentaries about the Dykelands studio. The 1953 20-minute production The Story of Peter and the Potter became "one of the most frequently-shown and longest-running films in the Board's library".

== Later years ==
In 1956 the Deichmanns left Dykelands and moved their pottery studio to Sussex, New Brunswick. In 1960 Kjeld Deichmann was awarded a Canada Council for the Arts grant and the Deichmanns spent several months visiting European ceramic artists in their studios. Kjeld Deichmann died suddenly in 1963 and Erica closed the studio and gave up pottery.

== Reputation and legacy ==
Deichmann pottery was included in the Canadian Handicrafts Guild's group exhibition at the 1937 World's Fair in Paris. Their work was also shown at the British Empire Exhibition in Glasgow in 1938 and the 1939 New York World's Fair. In 1940, representing the province of New Brunswick, they exhibited their work and gave live demonstrations of pottery making at the Montreal Arts and Crafts fair on Saint Helen's Island. In 1946 their work was shown in the League of Canadian Potters show in Toronto, and they exhibited regularly at the Canadian National Exhibition, winning prizes for pottery and glazes.

In 1955 the New Brunswick Museum exhibited Twenty years of Ceramics: Retrospective of Deichmann Pottery, and in 1961 the University of New Brunswick Art Centre hosted an exhibition of their porcelain and stoneware. The Canadian Museum of Civilization has a collection of 64 pieces of Deichmann pottery ranging from 1935 to 1963. This collection was the basis of an exhibition at the Canadian Museum of Civilization in 1991.
