= Erica Deichmann Gregg =

Canadian studio potter

- Born: Erica Luisa Matthiesen; 23 July 1913; Denmark, Wisconsin
- Died: 21 May 2007 (aged 93); Hampton, New Brunswick
- Occupation: Studio potter
- Years active: 1935–1963

Signature
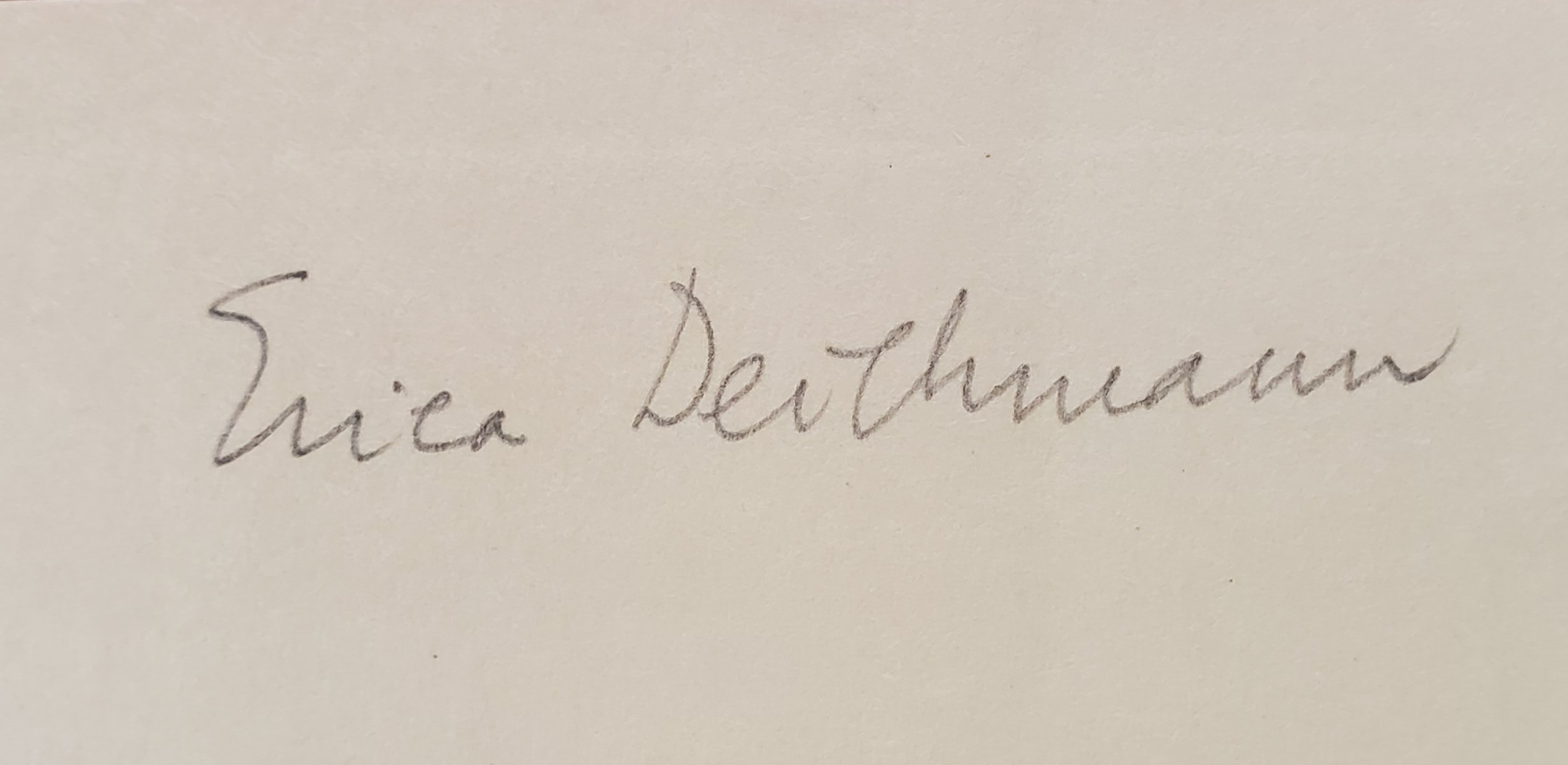

Erica Deichmann Gregg CM D.Litt. (née Matthiesen; 23 July 1913 – 21 May 2007) was a Canadian studio potter. In the 1930s she and her first husband Kjeld Deichmann created Deichmann pottery, Canada's first studio pottery.

== Early life ==
Erica Luisa Matthiesen was born in Denmark, Wisconsin, one of five daughters of a Danish Lutheran pastor. The family returned to Denmark when Erica was seven years old and she spent her childhood there. In the late 1920s the family moved to Canada and lived in Edmonton, where she met Kjeld Deichmann, a Danish immigrant. She married Deichmann in 1932 in Saint John, New Brunswick, and they settled on a farm on the Kingston Peninsula near Saint John.

== Art career ==
The Deichmanns spent a year in Europe, where Kjeld apprenticed as a potter with Axel Brüel, helping him to build a kiln, and Erica studied weaving. On their return to New Brunswick they set up a pottery studio at their home, which they called Dykelands because of the presence of several small dykes on their property. Kjeld built a wood-burning kiln in which they made their first firing in 1935.

The Deichmanns were largely self-taught and perfected their production methods through constant experimentation regarding kiln design, clay composition, and glazes. Erica was responsible for inventing the glazes, of which she made over 5,000 experimental mixtures during her career as a potter. She also decorated the pottery, usually painting on the raw clay before the work was fired in the kiln, and hand-modelled fanciful miniature animal forms which she called "goofi".

In 1956 the Deichmanns moved their pottery studio to Sussex, New Brunswick. Kjeld Deichmann died suddenly in June 1963. Erica closed the studio after her husband's death and stopped making pottery.

== Later life ==
In 1964 she married the Canadian war hero, politician and diplomat Milton Fowler Gregg, and was thereafter known as Erica Deichmann Gregg. She was named a member of the Order of Canada in 1987. The citation to her appointment noted that in addition to being an "influential, international award-winning potter", she was an active volunteer for many organizations including "the Society for the Preservation of New Brunswick's Covered Bridges, the Beaverbrook Art Gallery, the Conservation council of New Brunswick and the Critical Natural Areas of New Brunswick Project". In May 1992 the University of New Brunswick awarded her an honorary Doctor of Letters degree.

Erica Deichmann Gregg died in Hampton, New Brunswick, on 27 May 2007. She and Kjeld Deichmann had one son and two daughters, one of whom was the novelist and poet Elisabeth Harvor.
