= Florian Gadsby =

British potter

- Born: 1992 (age 33–34); Norfolk, England
- Occupations: Potter, author, content creator

YouTube information
- Channel: Florian Gadsby
- Subscribers: 1.8 million
- Views: 1.2 billion
- Last updated: 7 December 2025
- Website: https://www.floriangadsby.com/

Florian Gadsby is a British potter and social media influencer. He is currently based in North London.

== Early life ==
Although he was born in Norfolk, Gadsby moved to London at the age of five. He was first introduced to pottery while a student at grade school, namely Rudolf Steiner School in North London. After graduating high school, Gadsby enrolled in the Design and Crafts Council of Ireland’s ceramic skills and design training course, an internship based in Kilkenny, Ireland. He won the "student of the course" award at the pottery.

After returning to the United Kingdom, Gadsby was hired as an apprentice to Lisa Hammond. It was during this internship when he started posting online; since starting, Gadsby has posted every day without fail. In 2023, he published a book about his apprenticeships.

Gadsby interned in Mashiko, Japan for six months under Ken Matsuzaki after being recommended by Hammond.

== Career ==
Though he started posting on social media before, Gadsby's popularity substantially increased during the COVID-19 pandemic. Gadsby posts on Instagram daily, having done so since starting social media. He has gained millions of followers, and his online shop often sells out within minutes.

Gadsby's pieces are noted for their sleek, minimalist style, and its sharp edges. Most of his pieces have a light blue colour, similar to the celadon glazes invented in China in the late Han Dynasty.
