= Ken Ferguson (ceramist) =

American ceramist (1928–2004)

- Born: Kenneth Richard Ferguson; 1928; Elwood, Indiana, US
- Died: December 30, 2004 (aged 75–76); Shawnee, Kansas, US
- Education: Carnegie Institute of Technology, Alfred University

Vessel with Hares by Ken Ferguson, wheel-thrown and hand-built glazed stoneware, Honolulu Museum of Art

Kenneth Richard Ferguson (1928–2004) was an American ceramist.

== Biography ==
Kenneth Richard Ferguson was born in 1928 in Elwood, Indiana. He received a Bachedlor of Fine Arts degree in painting from the Carnegie Institute of Technology in 1952, and a Masters of Fine Arts degree in ceramics from New York State College of Ceramics at Alfred University in 1958.

From 1958 to 1964, he managed the Archie Bray Foundation for the Ceramic Arts in Helena, Montana. From 1964 to 1996, Ferguson was Head of the Ceramics Department at the Kansas City Art Institute. His students included Chris Gustin, Richard T. Notkin, Akio Takamori, and Kurt Weiser. He died at his home in Shawnee, Kansas on December 30, 2004.

Ferguson is best known for his stoneware incorporating sculptures of hares, such as Vessel with Hares in the collection of the Honolulu Museum of Art.

Public collections holding work by Ferguson include the Brooklyn Museum, the Carnegie Museums of Pittsburgh, the Charles A. Wustum Museum of Fine Arts, the Everson Museum of Art, the Henry Art Gallery, the Los Angeles County Museum of Art (LACMA), the MacNider Art Museum, the Museum of Arts and Design, the Nelson-Atkins Museum of Art, the Newark Museum, the Saint Louis Art Museum, the Canton Museum of Art, the Victoria and Albert Museum, Honolulu Museum of Art, and others.
