= Irene Clennell case =

Singaporean citizen

Irene Clennell
- Born: 1964 (age 61–62); Singapore, Malaysia
- Spouse: John Clennell
- Children: 2

Irene Clennell (born 1964) is a Singaporean citizen who immigrated to the United Kingdom in 1988 and whose deportation in February 2017 garnered worldwide attention. Clennell married a British man in 1990 and received indefinite leave to remain status. However, as she spent extended periods in Singapore with her husband, and later alone caring for her parents, her status was revoked. Clennell's applications for a new visa were rejected and in January 2017, Clennell was detained for one month and then deported to Singapore. Campaigners took up her case as symbolic of the wider problems with the Home Office's immigration crackdown and agitated for her to be allowed to return. In August 2017, the Home Office approved a new visa for Clennell and allowed her to return to the UK.

== Background ==
Clennell was born in Singapore (then a part of Malaysia) in 1964. Her father, a former soldier who had served alongside the British Army following the Second World War, inspired in her a strong attachment to the United Kingdom, and in 1988 she moved to the UK and worked as a hotel receptionist in Lancaster Gate, London. There she met John Clennell, whom she married in 1990. The couple moved to Ouston, County Durham, and had two children.

As the spouse of a British citizen, Clennell was entitled to indefinite leave to remain. However, this status is voided if the holder spends more than two years outside the country. The Clennells moved to Singapore in 1992 after John got a job in the country, and Irene remained to care for her dying mother after her husband and sons left. After returning to the UK for a time, she travelled back to Singapore in 2001 to deal with her old flat in the country. On return, Clennell was given only a visitor visa, and her applications to renew her permanent status were denied. Clennell was therefore forced to leave the UK in 2005. Subsequent applications for residency were also denied, and in 2007, despite holding a valid visitor visa, Clennell was stopped at the UK border and forced to return to Singapore without seeing her family. Clennell remained in Singapore to care for her father, who had cancer, and then lived for several years in India. A 2012 application for leave to remain was denied because Clennell could not provide sufficient proof of contact with her family, but with a new visitor visa, Clennell was allowed to re-enter the UK in 2013. She became the primary carer for her husband, who was ill and had recently had to give up his job, but as he could not make the recently introduced £18,600 earning threshold for a spousal visa, her application was once again denied.

== 2017 deportation and return ==
While her application was processed, Clennell was given leave to remain, incumbent on signing in regularly at the immigration reporting centre at Middlesbrough. On one routine visit on 19 January 2017, Clennell was detained and taken to Dungavel Immigration Removal Centre in Scotland. On 26 February, Clennell was taken from Dungavel and put on a flight to Singapore, with only the clothes she was wearing when she was detained and £12 in cash.

Clennell's case was reported worldwide, and opposition politicians came to her defence. The Shadow Home Secretary Diane Abbott described Clennell's treatment as "brutal and unfair", noting that women are traditionally expected to care for relatives and are disproportionately caught out in such cases. Brian Paddick, the Liberal Democrat Home Affairs spokesperson, said "this case highlights the complete irrationality and inhumanity of our immigration system" and his successor Ed Davey, told BuzzFeed UK that: "The Home Office's immigration arm is plagued by errors, delays, and poor decision-making. Cases like that of Irene's remind us of the real human damage caused by this incompetence." The Home Office did not comment on Clennell's case, but said, "We expect those with no legal right to remain in the country to leave".

Clennell's case also captured public interest: a survey by YouGov found that 63% of those questioned thought the government was wrong to deport Clennell, versus 17% who thought it was right. A GoFundMe crowdfunding campaign raised £50,000 for her legal expenses. With these funds, Clennell was able to hire a lawyer – her previous failed attempts had been made without legal help, which had led to errors that hindered her applications – and applied again for a spousal visa. This time, Clennell was successful, and she was able to return to the UK on 30 August 2017.
