= Katch Skinner =

British artist

Katch Skinner is a ceramicist based in Hebden Bridge, Yorkshire.

== Education and career ==
Skinner began her career by taking evening classes and went on to study a BA in Art & Design and an MA in Visual Arts.

Inspired by the process of making with clay - "its a medium that keeps you on your toes and has an addictive alchemy" - Skinner hand makes all her domestic ware work from scratch, and specialises in making specially commissioned work for museums and galleries. Skinner is a studio holder at Northlight Art Studios in Hebden Bridge, West Yorkshire, where she works and teaches ceramics classes.

== Selected projects ==
In 2018 Skinner won the Liberty Open Call competition, becoming one of three makers chosen to have their work stocked at the Liberty London store, with her limited edition distinctive character egg cups.

Also in 2018, Skinner's work was included in an exhibition at Cartwright Hall which celebrated 100 years since the suffragettes helped to secure the vote for women. As part of the celebration of the centenary of the vote for women, commissioned ceramic pieces by Skinner were also part of A Woman's Place exhibition at the Abbey House Museum in Leeds. The commemorative pieces, commissioned by Leeds Museums & Galleries and now held in their collection, celebrated local Yorkshire heroines.

Prior to her commissions from Leeds, Skinner embarked upon a self-directed project entitled 'Women in British History' - an ongoing series of commemorative ceramic ware to celebrate remarkable women, both famous and those less well-known. Skinner was invited to exhibit her 'Women in British history' project at the Innovation Centre in Halifax, with the addition of a ‘Elsie Whiteley’ plate specially commissioned for the show.
