= Grazia Deruta =

Pottery manufacturer in Deruta, Italy

- Native name: Grazia Maioliche s.a.s.
- Industry: Pottery
- Founded: 1500
- Headquarters: via Tiberina 181, 06053 Deruta, Italy
- Website: www.ubaldograzia.com

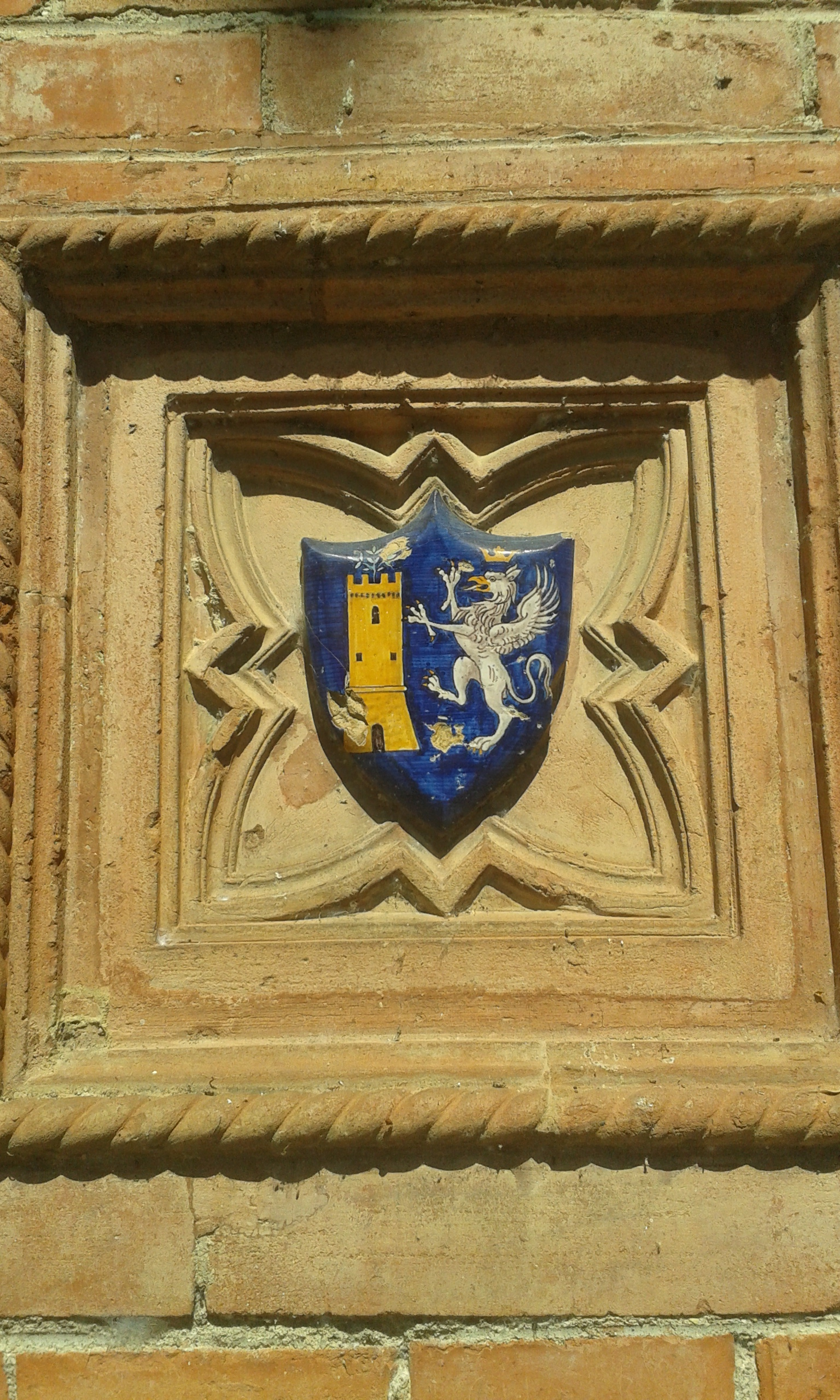
Example of Grazia Deruta product

Grazia Deruta is pottery producer in Deruta, Italy, the family business with the tradition from 1500.

In the factory building is the Grazia Museum founded in 2001 and presenting 690 ceramic works, the ancient origins and the development of the Grazia factory.

== See also ==
- List of oldest companies
