= Eiraku Myōzen =

Japanese ceramicist (1852–1927)

Eiraku Myōzen (永樂 妙全; 1852–1927) was a Japanese ceramist and businesswoman. She led the Eiraku workshop in Kyoto, becoming its fourteenth head upon the death of her husband Tokuzen; she was one of few women to head a crafts workshop in Japan. At her death she was succeeded by Shozen, a nephew of her husband; in his turn he was succeeded by her adopted son. A presentation set of coffee cups and saucers produced under Myōzen's direction was acquired by the Arthur M. Sackler Gallery in 2018. Another work, a mizusashi with bamboo in porcelain, was acquired by the Seattle Art Museum in the same year.
