= Felicity Palmateer =

Australian surfer (born 1992)

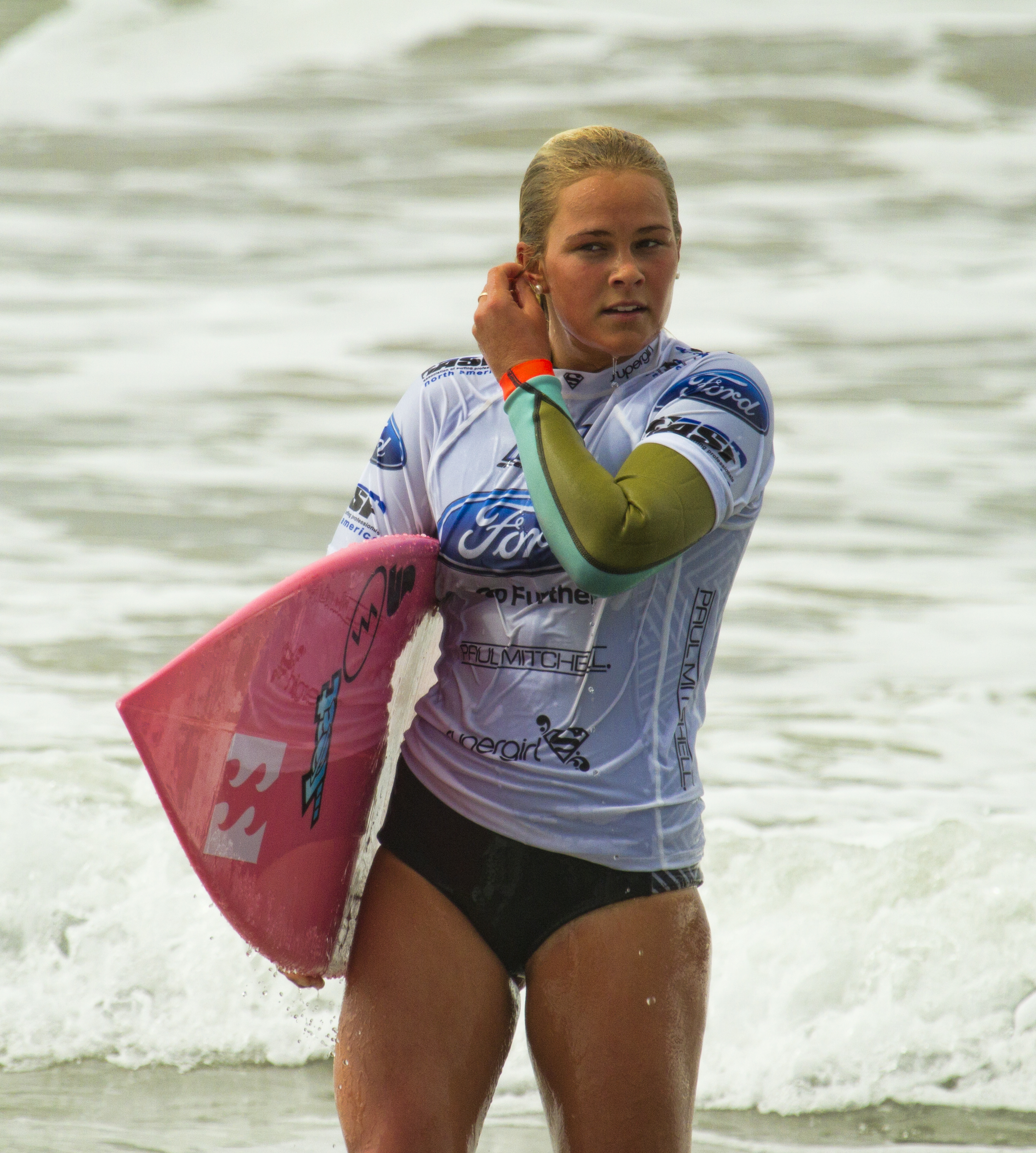
- Palmateer finishing her heat at the Supergirl Pro in Oceanside, California

Personal information
- Born: Felicity Tamasyn Palmateer; 4 August 1992 (age 34) Hillarys, Western Australia
- Height: 5 ft 9 in (175 cm)

Surfing career
- Sport: Surfing
- Career earnings: $64,438
- Sponsors: Billabong, Channel Islands Surfboards, Future Fins, The Surfboard Room

Surfing specifications
- Stance: Goofy

Felicity Tamasyn "Flick" Palmateer (born 4 August 1992) is an Australian professional surfer who competes at the World Surf League.

== Early life ==
Palmateer was born in Perth, Western Australia. She spent her childhood on the beaches of Western Australia surfing with her father, Warrick Palmateer, and two younger brothers. She was 12 years old when she competed in her first surf contest. Palmateer's parents, both artists, encouraged and supported her twin careers of art and surfing.

== Career ==
In 2015 Palmateer rode the biggest wave ever ridden by a female Australian surfer at Cowaramup Bombora (aka Cow Bombie) off the coast of Margaret River, south of Perth.

In 2016, she was invited to compete in the Pe'ahi Women's Challenge on the island of Maui.

=== Career highlights ===
Surf Career Highlights
Year	Placed	Event
2015		Nominated in the Ride of the Year 2015 XXL Big Wave Awards
2013	1st	1st Margaret River Pro Trials - Australia
2009	2nd	Billabong Pro Junior - Bells Beach, Australia
2009	1st	Open and Junior State Champion - Western Australia
2009	1st	Chill Pro Junior - Trigg Beach, Western Australia
2009	1st	Rip Curl Gromsearch National Final - Bells Beach, Australia
2009	3rd	Rip Curl Gromsearch International Fiona - Bells Beach, Australia
2008	1st	Margaret River Open Women's Classic - Australia
2008	1st	Rip Curl Gromsearch - (under 16) - Mandurah, Australia
2008	2nd	Parko Grom Stomp - (under 16) – Caloundra, Australia
2008	1st	Taj's Small Fries - (under 16) - Australia
2008	4th	Roxy Surf Festival - (under 18) – Phillip Island, Australia
2007	1st	Volcom Stones Cuttlefish Surf Series - Scarborough, Australia
2007	1st	Rip Curl Gromsearch – (under 16) - Trigg Beach, Australia
2007	1st	Margaret River Open Women's Classic - Australia

== Sponsors ==
Palmateer's sponsors have included Billabong, Channel Islands Surfboards, Future Fins, The Surfboard Room.

== Television appearances ==
In 2021, Palmateer competed on Australian Survivor: Brains V Brawn. In 2023, she appeared on Australian Survivor: Heroes V Villains as a member of the Heroes tribe. Palmateer would be eliminated on Day 31, finishing in 11th place and becoming the first member of the jury.

== Personal life ==
Palmateer came out as bisexual on Instagram and has identified as such since 2010. During filming of Australian Survivor: Brains V Brawn, Palmateer's mother died from younger onset frontotemporal dementia. In March 2023, Palmateer was chosen to be an ambassador for non-profit organisation Dementia Australia.
