= Warrick Palmateer =

Australian studio potter and art teacher (born 1969)

- Born: 1969 (age 56–57); Melbourne, Australia
- Education: Curtin University
- Known for: Ceramics
- Spouse: Pauline
- Website: warrickpalmateer.com

Warrick Palmateer (born 1969) is an Australian studio potter and art teacher. He is most well known for his collaboration with ceramic artist Pippin Drysdale since 1992. Palmateer is the creator of the vessels — both open and closed forms — that Drysdale uses as canvasses. Palmateer also specializes in creating large wheel thrown and coiled vessels. He is widely regarded by his peers as the finest thrower of porcelain in Australia.

== Biography ==
Palmateer was born in Melbourne in 1969. He graduated with an Advanced Diploma in Studio Ceramics from Perth's North Metropolitan TAFE and gained a Bachelor of Fine Arts in 1999 and a Diploma of Education in 2003 from Curtin University. He works as an art teacher at Prendiville Catholic College in Ocean Reef, Western Australia. His wife is Pauline, a fashion designer. Their daughter is professional surfer Felicity Palmateer.

== Career ==
Collaborating with famous ceramic artist Pippin Drysdale, Palmateer creates porcelain forms that have helped to make Drysdale Australia's highest earning ceramicist. Drysdale credits him with being a key element in her success:

I always say, without Warrick my work wouldn't exist. I feel like the luckiest bunny in the world to have someone make me the beautiful forms to create my own journey on ... Words can't express my gratitude. But he has an incredible throwing skill and an incredible sense of form

Apart from his collaborative work with Drysdale, Palmateer also creates monumental forms on a theme of sea, rock and sand. Working with Perth brick making factories, Palmateer creates large coiled pots up to 1.5 metres (4.9 ft) tall and weighing 100 kilograms (220 lb) to 200 kilograms (440 lb) that require a forklift to move, and industrial brick kilns to fire. Palmateer, an avid surfer, is inspired by the sea and rock forms found on Western Australia's coast in the littoral zone – where land meets ocean, particularly the bleached limestone at Yanchep Beach. Palmateer uses mouldings and casting of textures from rocks, fossils and shells and uses them on the surface of the brick clay vessels.
