= Nesta Nala =

Nesta Nala (1940-2005) was a Zulu-speaking artist working in the medium of clay. Nala produced a range of earthenware, blackened ceramics that were highly burnished and embellished with both applied and inscribed surface decorations.

== Biography ==
Born in Oyaya, KwaZulu-Natal, South Africa, Nala dug her clay locally and created ceramics in the ukhamba (nearly spherical) and uphiso (necked) forms. These ceramic vessels are most well known as beer pots, used for drinking and serving sorghum beer.

Nala was taught ceramics by her mother's and grandmother's generations, including from her mother Siphiwe MaS'Khakhane Nala.

Nesta Nala's daughters continue her legacy and create ceramics. These daughters include Bongikile, Jabulile, Thembile, Zanele (d. 2006), and Nonhlanhla (d. 2006).

Nala influenced many contemporary ceramic artists who have been inspired by the Zulu-speaking ceramic style of creating burnished beer pots. Clive Sithole, a contemporary artist who was born in Soweto and traces his family to the KwaZulu-Natal region, worked with Nesta Nala during his early years and considers her to be a major influence in his career. Ian Garrett, a ceramist living in the Western Cape region, wrote his Master's of Fine Art thesis on Nala and documented Nala's emergence as an artist selling ceramics in urban South Africa, particularly during the 1980s.

=== Awards ===
Nesta Nala was included in the Cairo Ceramics Biennale in 1994, the winner of an FNB (First National Bank) Vita Craft Award in 1995, and won first prize at the South African National Ceramics Biennale in 1996. Nala also represented South Africa at the Smithsonian Folklife Festival in 1999.
