= Akio Takamori =

Japanese-American ceramic sculptor (1950–2017)

- Born: October 11, 1950; Nobeoka, Miyazaki Japan
- Died: January 11, 2017 (aged 66)
- Citizenship: American
- Education: Musashino Art University, Kansas City Art Institute, Alfred University
- Known for: Ceramic sculpture
- Website: akiotakamori.com

Akio Takamori (1950 – 2017) was a Japanese-American ceramic sculptor and educator. Takamori often incorporated human forms into his creations.

== Early life and education ==
Takamori was born in Nobeoka, Miyazaki, Japan on October 11, 1950. His childhood home had his father's attached medical clinic which was to be later a one of several sources for his inspiration. In Japan, Takamori attended Musashino Art University. In 1974, he moved to the United States and attended the Kansas City Art Institute (KCAI) where he studied with ceramist Ken Ferguson who encouraged him to work figuratively. Takamori received an MFA in 1978 from Alfred University in New York. He subsequently had artist residencies at the Archie Bray Foundation in Montana, the European Ceramic Workcentre in the Netherlands, and the Kecskemét International Ceramic Studios in Hungary.

== Career ==
He moved to Vashon Island in 1988 and set up a studio with a salt kiln and lived there until 1994. While there, in 1993, Takamori began his teaching career at the University of Washington where he taught until he retired in 2014 as professor emeritus.

Takamori died on January 11, 2017, in Seattle, Washington of pancreatic cancer.

== Select shows and collections ==
His work is in the collection of the Carnegie Museum of Art, the Los Angeles County Museum of Art, the Museum of Arts and Design, the Nelson-Atkins Museum of Art, the Victoria and Albert Museum, His work, Alice with Rose, was acquired by the Smithsonian American Art Museum as part of the Renwick Gallery's 50th Anniversary Campaign.

In 2000, the Racine Art Museum held a retrospective of his work. In 2022, the Vashon Center for the Arts held a retrospective of his work curated by his wife Vicky and the James Harris Gallery. In 2024, the Keramikmuseum Westerwald in Höhr-Grenzhausen held an exhibition entitled "Akio Takamori: Consideration" in which his drawings, ceramic figurative work of couples, as well as his karako were shown.

== Awards and honors ==
In 2001, Takamori received a Virginia A. Groot Foundation Award. In 2006, Takamori became a Fellow of the American Craft Council. The same year he was awarded a Joan Mitchell Foundation Painters and Sculptors Grant.
