= Danny Kaplan =

American artist (born 1984)

Danny Kaplan (born 1984) is an American artist, including ceramist and furniture designer.

== Early life and education ==
Kaplan was born in New York City, in 1984. He grew up in Aix-en-Provence, France.

The artist graduated from The New School with a Bachelor of Fine Arts degree in creative writing, art history, and fine arts. After school, Kaplan began work as a prop stylist in New York City and then eventually moved towards ceramics.

== Career ==
In 2015, Kaplan registered for the La Mano Pottery studio in Manhattan. Once completed, he started making ceramic lamps and tableware.

In 2017, Kaplan and illustrator and ceramicist Bruno Grizzo, began a line of hand-hewn table lamps.

The artist Vince Patti of Lesser Miracle collaborated with Kaplan's Studio in 2024 to launch the Delf Collection, which features a bed frame that has Patti's woodworking of a "hinged-screen floating wood headboard" and Kaplan's "geometric jewel-tone tile detailing". The five-piece collection was inspired by the timber-frame buildings of East Asia, Vallauris tiles and ceramics, 20th-century Art Deco and Bauhaus, Tobia Scarpa, and Frank Lloyd Wright. To emphasize Kaplan's handmade tiles, Patti shaped pathways and sections in white oak to accommodate the inlay details. He refers to the collection as "ceramic pieces encased in wood".

Kaplan typically works with soft clay. Design elements include aspects such as smooth orbs and bowls, horns, half moons, and convex, often made by a layer of porcelain slip. Then, it is fired with a matte bone-white glaze or a smooth coal-black glaze. His style alludes to early primitive art to midcentury abstraction as well as earnest handicraft. His work nods to the minimal style of the 1930s French designer Jean-Michel Frank, Roger Capron, German Modernist ceramist Hans Coper, and ancient Greek and Mayan potters.

== See also ==
- List of studio potters
