= Keiko Fukazawa =

Japanese ceramicist (born 1955)

- Born: 1955 (age 70–71); Niigata, Japan
- Education: Musashino Art University, Sotoen Studio of Shigaraki Ware, Otis College of Art and Design
- Known for: ceramic art and sculpture
- Website: www.keikofukazawa.com

Keiko Fukazawa (born 1955 in Niigata, Niigata Prefecture, Japan) is an Issei (first generation) Japanese ceramicist active in the United States. She is known for her whimsical yet poignant sculptures that often incorporate traditional Asian motifs, while also addressing cultural and social issues. Fukazawa's later work incorporates graffiti-like styles that reference violence and modern issues such as globalization, consumerism, and capitalism. Her "functional, though impractical...interpretations of traditional forms serve as a personal vehicle of expression to integrate her heritage with her American environment." She states, "I want to share something as an immigrant artist." After moving to the United States to escape the limited opportunities for women artists in Japan, she studied at Otis College of Art and Design and Parsons School of Art.

== Education and career ==
After growing up in Tokyo, Fukazawa earned her Bachelor of Fine Arts at Musashino Art University in 1977, originally focusing on painting. She later changed her focus to ceramics to pursue a more practical profession for a woman in Japan. Completing her post-graduate studies in ceramics there in 1981, she also studied at the studio of Sotoen in Shigaraki, but soon realized that due to the "conservative nature of art education for women" in Japan, it could be years before she would be allowed to produce her own individual work. Fukazawa relocated to the United States, and after a brief time at Anderson Ranch Arts Center in Snowmass Village, Colorado, she moved to California in 1984 to follow her interest in the California Funk Movement and artists like Peter Voulkos, Marilyn Levine, and Ron Nagle. "I'd read in a magazine of many things happening on the West Coast in avant-garde ceramics, beautiful, strong pieces." In LA she studied at Otis College of Art and Design and earned her Master of Fine Arts in 1986. There, she studied under ceramicist Ralph Bacerra, whose focus in teaching was on technical ability and the integrity in form and surface, which influenced her early work.

== Teaching career ==
Fukazawa went on to teach at the Department of Corrections, California Rehabilitation Center in Norco and as adjunct faculty at Otis College of Art and Design in 1992, at the California State Polytechnic University, Pomona, the University of Southern California, Cerritos College and multiple disciplinary youth/women's facilities. In 1998, Fukazawa married photographer Dennis O. Callwood. In a joint 2002 exhibition Art and Deviation, the couple challenged "assumptions about 'juvie' kids and their so-called low culture" through works in collaboration with youth at Camp Ronald McNair, an incarcerating rehabilitative center in Lancaster, CA. Starting in 2013, Fukazawa spent three years in Jingdezhen, China, a "global center of ceramic production and innovation for almost 2,000 years." These experiences inspired her 2016 exhibition, Made in China, which featured pieces that address Chinese capitalism. She retired as associate professor of visual arts and media studies at Pasadena City College in Pasadena, CA, in 2019.

== Artist statement ==
Fukazawa has stated:

There are many directions to explore in clay. It is important to open myself to this era and this moment, and to use the material freely... I really enjoy the inconsistencies and mysteries of clay and glaze... My interest now is in making environmental pieces using both figurative and abstract expression.
