= Bruce Chivers =

Australian potter

Bruce Chivers (born 1954 in Australia) is a studio potter described by writer and art critic Peter Davies "as an artist whose work shines with a flowing lyricism in which decoration is intrinsically linked to form but equally linked to natural random processes of image formation of the kind favoured by the American Abstract Expressionist and the European "matter" painters.

Chivers studied at Salisbury Teachers College, Adelaide university 1973–77. As an established maker and member of the Potters Guild of South Australia he travelled to England in 1985 to complete an invited residency and to exhibit in London. After traveling extensively throughout Europe and with the support and friendship of David Leach at Lowerdown pottery, he established his first UK workshop in Devon at nearby Chudleigh on the edge of Dartmoor.

Chivers accepted the post of artist-in-residence at South Devon College (Plymouth University) in 2005, and consequently became lead lecturer on the 3D Design ceramics degree.

Chivers uses local porcelain clay bodies and fires using reduction techniques. He is internationally known for his expressive Raku ware exhibition pieces.

Chivers has exhibited widely in the UK, including the V & A Museum, throughout North America, Australia and Japan.
