= Kurt Weiser =

American ceramicist and professor (born 1950)

Kurt Weiser (born 1950 in Lansing, Michigan) is an American ceramicist and professor. His work—explorations of the relationship between man and nature through narratives rendered in vivid color—are described as "Eden-like." His work has often taken the form of teapots, vases, and cups, though he has recently begun crafting globes as well. Weiser is currently the regents professor at Arizona State University's School of Art.

== Education and career ==
Many, Many (2005) by Kurt Weiser at the Renwick Gallery in Washington, DC in 2022

Believing that their young son was spending too much time with "a bad crowd," Weiser's parents sent him to the Interlochen Arts Academy, a boarding school located in northern Michigan. He studied ceramics under Ken Ferguson at the Kansas City Art Institute, earning his BFA in 1972. He attended the University of Michigan to earn his MFA in 1976. Weiser also directed the Archie Bray Foundation in Helena, MT, from 1977 to 1988.

While at the Archie Bray Foundation, Weiser explored the possibilities of clay and focused on "somehow express[ing] the beautiful nature of the material." However, around the time of his departure, he had a significant conceptual breakthrough as he theorized that materials exist to allow artists to speak rather than to tell artists what they should speak. After he began teaching at Arizona State University, he started to delve into incorporating narrative scenes into his work.

His first foray into experimenting with surface design resulted in a teapot displaying botanical imagery rendered in black and white sgraffito. "Sgraffito," Italian for "to scratch," is a technique that involves applying color to a piece, and then scratching part of that layer off to reveal the clay beneath it. Soon, probably inspired by trips to Thailand, which boasts a colorful variety of plant life, Weiser began to incorporate china painting in his working methods, ultimately moving toward more complex narrative scenes. They highlighted the proximity of man and nature, exploring binaries that, he hoped, would elicit a feeling of unease from his audience: "order and chaos, growth and decay, life and death, strength and weakness."

Weiser's recent work has grown to include the form of world globes as well as teapots—although, in the spirit of continuing the trend of putting viewers on edge, these globes do not always represent the earth as it is commonly known and perceived. Instead, they venture into surreal or fantastic interpretations, oftentimes exploring, as his teapots do, scenes of collision between man and nature.

== Artist statement ==
Weiser has stated:

The ideas and subjects of these paintings on the pots are for the most part just a collection of my own history of fantasy and view of reality. They are built the same way we dream: around a central idea, a cast of characters and environments just seem to show up to complete the picture.

== Awards ==
Weiser has received the following awards:

- 2003: Aileen Osborn Webb Award, American Crafts Council, New York City
- 1999: Artist Fellowship, Arizona Commission on the Arts
- 1999: Regents Professorship, Arizona State University
- 1998: Artist Fellowship, Asian Cultural Council
- 1998: Research and Creativity Award, Arizona State University
- 1992: Artist Fellowship, National Endowment for the Arts
- 1990: Artist Project Award, Arizona Commission on the Arts
- 1989: Artist Fellowship, National Endowment for the Arts
- 1986: Artist Fellowship, Montana Arts Council

== Museum collections ==
Wesier is represented in the following museum collections:

- Archie Bray Foundation for the Ceramic Arts, Helena, MT
- Arizona State University Art Museum, Tempe, AZ
- Carnegie Museum of Art, Pittsburgh, PA
- Crocker Art Museum, Sacramento, CA
- The George R. Gardiner Museum of Ceramic Art, Toronto, Ontario, Canada (now called the Gardiner Museum)
- Hamline University, Minneapolis, MN
- Helsinki Museum of Applied Arts, Helsinki, Finland (now called the Design Museum)
- Mint Museum of Art, Charlotte, NC
- Montgomery Museum of Fine Arts, Montgomery, AL
- Museum of Contemporary Ceramic Art, Shigaraki, Japan
- National Museum of History, Taipei, Taiwan, Republic of China
- Portland Art Museum, Portland, OR
- Racine Art Museum, Racine, WI
- Renwick Gallery of the Smithsonian American Art Museum, Washington, D.C.
- Victoria and Albert Museum, London, England
- Winnipeg Art Gallery, Winnipeg, Manitoba, Canada
- Yellowstone Art Museum, Billings, MT

== Selected solo exhibitions ==
Weiser's solo exhibitions around the U.S. include:

- 2013: The Nature of Imagination, Mackenzie Cross Gallery, Washington, D.C.
- 2009: Frank Lloyd Gallery, Santa Monica, CA
- 2008: Eden Revisited: The Ceramic Art of Kurt Weiser, Bellevue Art Museum, Bellevue, WA
- 2006: 55 Cups, Holter Museum of Art, Helena, MT
- 1999: Working his Way around China, Montgomery Museum of Fine Arts, Montgomery, AL
- 1996: Garth Clark Gallery (now called Clark + Del Vecchio), New York, NY
- 1993: Joanne Rapp Gallery, Scottsdale, AZ
- 1986: Lawrence Gallery, McMinnville, OR
- 1985: Paris Gibson Square Museum of Art, Great Falls, MT
- 1984: Yellowstone Art Museum, Billings, MT

== Selected group exhibitions ==
Weiser's work has been included in the following group exhibitions:

- 2016: Duets: RAM Pairs Contemporary Craft Artists, Racine Art Museum, Racine, WI
- 2015: Time for Tea: Contemporary Ceramic Teapots from RAM's Collection, Dane County Regional Airport, Madison, WI
- 2014: Magic Mud: Masterworks in Clay from RAM's Collection, Racine Art Museum, Racine, WI
- 2014: Bodies at Rest: Figurative Clay from RAM's Collection, Racine Art Museum, Racine, WI
- 2012: Blue & White, The Clay Studio, Philadelphia, PA
- 2010: Collecting with Passion: Contemporary Ceramics from the Lennie and Jerry Berkowitz Collection, Nelson-Atkins Museum of Art, Kansas City, MO
- 2002: Postmodern Ceramics, Dolphin Gallery, Kansas City, MO
- 2001: 1st World Ceramic Biennial (International Competition), Inchon, Korea
- 2000: Defining Craft I - Collecting for the New Millennium, American Craft Museum (now called the Museum of Arts and Design), New York, NY
- 2000: Color and Fire - Defining Moments in Studio Ceramics, 1950-2000, Los Angeles County Museum of Art, Los Angeles, CA
- 1999: Contained Narratives, Garth Clark Gallery (now called Clark + Del Vecchio), New York, NY
- 1998: American Craft, Renwick Gallery of the Smithsonian American Art Museum, Washington, D.C.
- 1998: Splendor of Porcelain, Los Angeles County Museum of Art, Los Angeles, CA
- 1995: The Nude in Clay, Perimeter Gallery, Chicago, IL (this location is now permanently closed)
- 1995: Contemporary Clay Works National, Phoenix Art Museum, Phoenix, AZ
- 1994: Museum of Contemporary Ceramic Art, Shigaraki, Japan
- 1992: The National Museum of History, Taipei, Taiwan, Republic of China
- 1990: Black and White, Joanne Rapp Gallery, Scottsdale, AZ
