= Kirk Mangus =

American sculptor (1952–2013)

Kirk Mangus (1952–2013) was an internationally renowned ceramic artist and sculptor "known for his playful, gestural style, roughhewn forms, and experimental glazing". His murals, works in clay, on paper, in wood, and other media pull from a rich and diverse set of influences: ancient Greco-Roman art, mythology, Japanese woodblock prints, comic books, folk stories, from Meso-American through Middle-Eastern and Asian ceramic traditions as well as the people he saw, the places he travelled, and his own dreamworld. He loved experimenting with new mediums, local materials, clay bodies, slips, kiln-building and the firing process.

Born in Sharon, PA, Mangus developed an early love of art from his parents who introduced him to Toshiko Takaezu, then at the Cleveland Institute of Art and sent him to study at Penland School of Crafts. Their inspiration and encouragement led him to receive his BFA from the Rhode Island School of Design (1975) and MFA from Washington State University, Pullman (1979). Mangus would remain friends with Takaezu throughout her life and fired her work over the years in his Anagama kilns in Pennsylvania and Ohio.

Mangus was Head of Ceramics at Kent State University from 1985 till his death in 2013 and also taught at Alfred University Summer School, Cleveland Institute of Art, and Cranbrook Academy of Art. He has lectured widely across the United States and internationally.

He was married to Eva Kwong, also an artist, whom he met as an undergrad at RISD. While their work styles differed greatly, they were both partners and collaborators.

His show continues to be shown post humously around the world including at Art Basel Miami with The Pit Gallery.

== Grants, awards, honors ==
2006

- National Council on the Education of Ceramic Arts International Residency Award to The Pottery Workshop, Shanghai and Experimental Sculpture Factory, Jingdezhen, China
- National Endowment for the Arts, Challenge America: Reaching Every Community Fast Track Review Grant, Summit County Youth Employment for Success for The Mural Project, Akron, OH. (Primary Artist)

2005 NCECA Purchase Award for their Permanent Collection, National Council on Education for the Ceramic Arts, Erie, CO. The 2005 Clay National Exhibition.

- University of Maryland, Baltimore County, Baltimore, MD.

2003

- McKnight Foundation Fellowship Residency at the Northern Clay Center, Minneapolis, MN.

1999

- Ohio Arts Council Fellowship

1996

- Ohio Arts Council Fellowship

1993

- Invited Artist, "Jinro International Ceramic Workshop", Seoul, Korea
- Invited Artist and Lecture, Shigaraki Ceramic Cultural Park, Shigaraki, Japan

1987

- Ohio Arts Council Fellowship Grant

1984

- Pennsylvania Council on the Arts Fellowship Grant

1982

- National Endowment on the Arts Fellowship Grant

== Collections ==
- Amsterdam Municipal Collection, Amsterdam, Netherlands
- Archie Bray Foundation, Helena, MT, USA
- Arizona State University Art Museum, Tempe, AZ, USA
- BP, Cleveland, OH, USA
- BW Rogers, Akron, OH, USA
- Canton Art Museum, Canton, OH, USA
- Carleton College, Northfield, MN, USA
- City of Panevesys Civic Art Gallery, Panevesys, Lithuania
- The Clay Studio, Philadelphia, PA, USA
- Cleveland Museum of Art, Cleveland, OH, USA
- Cranbrook Art Museum, Bloomfield Hills, MI, USA
- DeYoung Museum, Sandy Besser Collection, San Francisco, CA, USA
- Eli & Edythe Broad Art Museum, Michigan State University, East Lansing, MI, USA
- The Fabric Workshop, Philadelphia, PA, USA
- Finnish Craft Museum, Helsinki, Finland
- Frederick Weisman Museum of Art, Univ. of Minnesota, Minneapolis, MN, USA
- Geometry/WPP, Cleveland, OH, USA (mural)
- Geometry/WPP, Akron, OH, USA (mural reproduction)
- Graystone Real Estate, Cleveland, OH, USA
- Inchon World Ceramics Center, Suwon, Kyonggi Province, South Korea
- Jinro International Ceramics Workshop, Seoul, South Korea
- John Sinker Study Collection, Michigan State University, East Lansing, MI, USA
- HAP Pottery, Beijing, China
- Kent State University, School of Art, Kent, OH, USA
- Lakeside Studios, Lakeside, MI, USA
- Musee-atelier du verre a Sars Poreries, Sars Poteries, France
- National Museum of Contemporary Art, Seoul, South Korea
- National Council on Education for the Ceramic Arts, Erie, CO, USA
- Newark Museum of Art, Newark, NJ, USA
- Northern Clay Center, Minneapolis, MN, USA
- Pizzuti Collection, Columbus, OH, USA
- Ron Pizzuti, Palm Beach, FL, USA
- Presidential Palace Grounds, Vilmius, Lithuania
- The Pottery Workshop, Shanghai & Jingdezhen, China
- San Bao Ceramic Art Institute, Jingdezhen, China
- Schein-Joseph International Museum of Ceramic Art, Alfred University, Alfred, NY, USA
- Shigaraki Ceramic Cultural Park Art Museum, Shigaraki, Japan
- Southern Graphics Council Print Collection Southern Illinois University at Edwardsville, IL, USA
- South Texas College, McAllen, TX, USA
- Summit Artspace, City of Akron, Akron, OH, USA (mural)
- Sun Valley Art Center, Sun Valley, ID, USA (Potters and Prints edition)
- Univ. of Akron Print Collection, Akron, OH, USA
- Univ. of Iowa Museum of Art, Gerry Eskin Ceramics Collection, Iowa City, IA, USA
- Benedictine Park, Vilnius, Lithuania (Large Black CatGirl head sculpture)
- South Bend Regional Art Museum, South Bend, IN, USA (set of monoprints)
- World Ceramic Exposition 2001 Korea, Ichon World Ceramic Center, Suwon, Kyonggi Province, South Korea
