= Bruce Winn =

Bruce M. Winn (1959-2012) was an American ceramic artist.

Winn grew up in Connecticut. At the age of six he saw a pottery demonstration and knew that was what he wanted to do. He received his BFA at the Artisanry, Boston University in 1983 studying with Richard Hirsh and Christopher Gustin. In 1988, Winn received his MFA at Cranbrook Academy of Art, studying with Graham Marks. His work can be found in collections at the Museum of Fine Arts, Boston, the Stockholm Royal Palace, and the Newark Museum, to name a few. He has participated in many shows at various places including the Garth Clark Gallery, NYC; Truro Center for the Arts, Truro, Massachusetts; Nancy Margolis Gallery, NYC; The Clark Gallery, Lincoln, Massachusetts, and the Newark Museum, Newark, New Jersey.

The work Mr. Winn produced had a relationship to the Japanese, and eighteenth century France and nineteenth century Britain. He builds the surface through very ordered pattern; line and repetition are very prevalent in his work.

From 1997 to 2012, he co-owned Roseberry-Winn Pottery and Tile LLC with Michael Roseberry, a design and production studio in Tiverton, Rhode Island. Today, Roseberry-Winn pieces can be found in collections including L.L.Bean, Seasons Catalog, Garnet Hill Catalog, Barney's, the Museum of Fine Arts, Boston, and the Cleveland Museum of Art.

Winn died from metastatic cancer on January 17, 2012, in Tiverton, RI.
