= Tony Clennell =

Canadian studio potter and teacher

Tony Clennell (born c. 1951) is a Canadian studio potter and teacher.

== History ==
Clennell practised ceramics as a hobby when young. He trained to be a teacher at the University of Western Ontario, and qualified Bachelor of Education some time around 1970.

Influenced by Phil Aziz of London, Ontario, he decided on the life of an artist, and immersed himself in the lively art scene in Banff, Alberta, and studied pottery under Michael Casson in England.

Clennell married and moved to Beamsville, Ontario, where he and Sheila founded the Sour Cherry Pottery. They later moved to Hamilton, Ontario.

He has been reported as spending much of his time taking master classes in art pottery and studied for an MFA at Utah State University.

== Publications ==
- Stuck in the Mud. Pinecroft Pottery Publishing, 2014. March 2014. ISBN 978-0988154018.
