= Nic Collins (potter) =

British potter

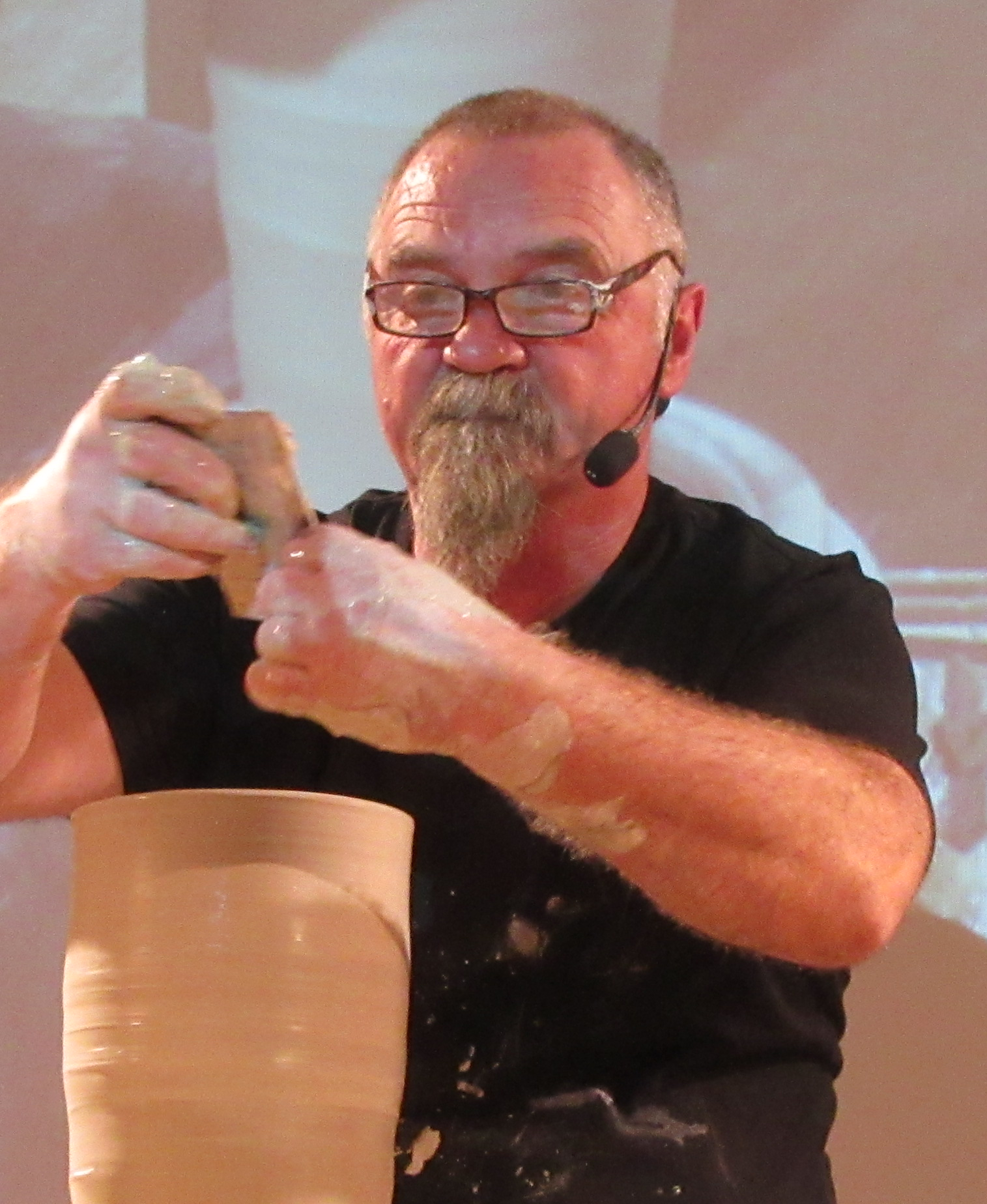
- Nic Collins at the Tel Hai Symposium in 2017
- Occupation: Potter
- Website: www.nic-collins.co.uk

Nic Collins is a woodfire potter who works in Devon, England, on the edge of Dartmoor.

== Process ==
Collins uses stoneware clay thrown on a kick wheel.

== Inspiration and philosophy ==
He states that simple pots are beautiful and that medieval pots are some of the most beautiful. He states that pots should be made from the “heart” and not from the “head”. He also said that if you think only about how thin, how stretched, or how light a pot is, then the pot is not necessarily bad, but it makes the pot stiff and people don't want to pick it up.
