= Richard T. Notkin =

American artist (born 1948)

'Heart Teapot: Homage to Archie Bray', stoneware by Richard Notkin, Metropolitan Museum of Art

Richard T. Notkin (born 1948) is an American ceramic artist, known for his reinterpretations of traditional Yixing pottery. He lives in Washington State, but formerly was based in Helena, Montana.

== Biography ==
Richard T. Notkin was born on October 1948, in Chicago, Illinois. He earned a BFA from Kansas City Art Institute in 1970, studying under Ken Ferguson. In 1973, he received his MFA from the University of California, Davis, where he studied under Robert Arneson.

Notkin lives in Washington State, but formerly was based in Helena, Montana. He is especially known for his shaping of Ancient Chinese Yixing pottery, as a way of expressing his feelings of war, leadership, and culture.

"I'm not making Yixing pots, I'm trying to make pots that have a separate cultural identity, that speak of my times, my country, my concerns".

— Richard Notkin,

His work consistently reflects anti-war and pro-environmentalist themes. His works are often sculptural interpretations of classic ceramic forms like teapots and tile-based murals, but without any functional aspect. His work features a high level of surface detail made with the assistance of complex plaster molds, magnifiers, and a variety of small scale tools.
