= Daniel Kaplan (physicist) =

French condensed matter physicist (born 1941)

Daniel Kaplan (born 28 April 1941) is a French condensed matter physicist whose main work concerns the electronic properties of semiconductors, magnetic resonance and ultra-short pulse lasers. He is a member of the French Academy of Sciences.

== Biography ==
Daniel Kaplan is a physicist working in the fields of condensed matter physics, magnetic resonance and ultra-short pulse laser optics. After graduating from the École Polytechnique (Class of 1960), he joined the Condensed Matter Laboratory headed by Ionel Solomon at the École Polytechnique. He is defending a doctoral thesis on the magnetic resonance of conduction electrons in indium antimonide. In parallel, he is exploring new techniques to detect the magnetic resonance of electrons (spin-dependent recombination) and nuclei (nuclear field effect on magnetoresistance).

== Professional career ==
From 1970 to 1972 Daniel Kaplan worked in the USA at IBM's T.J. Watson Research Center. He explores, using magnetic resonance, the structure of thin layers of amorphous silicon. It shows that, in pure amorphous silicon, a minimum number of unsatisfied chemical bonds is required to meet the stresses of the structure. These bond breaks produce paramagnetic sites and the reduction in the number of these sites is always due to additional chemical elements such as hydrogen. Hydrogenated amorphous silicon will later become a basic material for the production of large-area electronic devices such as flat screens or photovoltaic panels.

In 1972, he joined the physics laboratory of the Central Research Laboratory of Thomson CSF (now Thales) in Palaiseau. His main research activity is focused on understanding the insulating-metal transition in oxides such as Vanadium Dioxide. The combination of optical, electrical and magnetic resonance measurements clarified the respective roles of the network distortion degeneration lift and the Mott transition in this phase change. At the same time, he is continuing his research on amorphous silicon. It shows that the paramagnetic resonance signals observed on vacuum-cleaved silicon crystal surfaces are due to contamination by small amorphous silicon particles. It also demonstrates the process of hydrogenation of pure amorphous silicon layers with hydrogen plasma. In addition, the mechanism of spin-dependent recombination in silicon is elucidated in a theoretical paper published by Kaplan, Solomon, and Mott.

In 1983, he joined the medical branch of Thomson CSF (Thomson CGR) as Scientific Director. He then supervised research and development in the field of digital radiology, X-ray scanning and magnetic resonance imaging.

In 1988, he became head of Thomson CSF's central research laboratory, which conducts research covering computer science, electronic and optical devices and new techniques for consumer electronics. He was president of the French Physical Society between 1992 and 1994.

In 1993, he left the Thomson CSF group and created the Alloy company to develop an original way of conducting public-private partnership research. The Alloy company hires young researchers to work in public laboratories, in France or abroad, on industrial projects. Daniel Kaplan plays the role of project manager in these actions. He repeatedly presents this mode of operation and its importance in conferences.

In 1999, he founded Fastlite with P Tournois to design and manufacture instruments in the field of ultra-short pulse lasers. The company's flagship product will be an original acousto-optical device (Dazzler™) allowing the electronic programming of the spectral phase of these lasers. This programming is an essential tool for the implementation of the CPA (Chirped Pulse Amplification) method, invented by Mourou and Strickland (Nobel Prize 2018), which has profoundly transformed the performance of ultra-intense lasers. The company will also invent and commercialize a new method for measuring the temporal form of pulses. Daniel Kaplan is currently President of Fastlite, which continues to develop its activity in the field of parametric amplification of ultra-short pulses.

== Distinctions ==
- 2013: Chevalier of the Légion d'honneur
- Member of the French Academy of Sciences, elected on 5 November 2001
- Member of the French Academy of Technologies in 2000
- Winner in 1984 of the Blondel medal awarded by the Société de l'électricité, de l'électronique et des technologies de l'information et de la communication
- Officier in the Ordre National du Mérite.

== Publication ==
In collaboration with A. Aspect, R. Balian, G. Bastard, J.P. Bouchaud, B. Cabane, F. Combes, T. Encrenaz, S. Fauve, A. Fert, M. Fink, A. Georges, J.F. Joanny, D. Le Bihan, P. Léna, H. Le Treut, J-P Poirier, J. Prost and J.L. Puget, Demain la physique, Odile Jacob editions, 2009 (ISBN 9782738123053)
