= Lisa Hammond (potter) =

British studio potter (born 1956)

Lisa Hammond (born 1956) is a British studio potter.

== Career ==
She is a Fellow of the Craft Potters Association of Britain. She has specialised in vapour glazing since leaving college, first using salt and, since the early 1980s, soda glaze. She produces a range of functional ware for the preparation, cooking and serving of food. Alongside functional ware, she makes a range of work that she describes as "individual and playful". Hammond worked in Greenwich, London from 1979 and briefly set up a studio in Okehampton, Devon.

In 2003-2004, she spent three months making and firing in the Mino, Gifu, area for several exhibitions in Japan. She taught ceramics at Goldsmiths College, London, and has lectured and exhibited widely. In 2012 Hammond relocated back to Greenwich, London, to Maze Hill Pottery.

Over the course of her career she has taught upwards of a dozen apprentices at both Maze Hill Pottery in Greenwich and Kigbeare Pottery for periods ranging from one to three years, notable apprentices includes Yo Thom, Adam Frew, Billy Lloyd, Yoji Yamada, Darren Ellis, Florian Gadsby, Dom Upson and Francis Lloyd-Jones. Hammond has been described as one of the most committed and driven of modern studio potters, "one of a small number who have clearly inherited the mantle of studio pioneers like Michael Cardew" and "the best woman potter working in Britain". Her work is represented in museums and collections in the UK and abroad.

== Clay College ==
In 2017 Hammond founded Clay College Stoke, based in Middleport Pottery, a skills-based, full-time ceramics course taught by potters from throughout the country and internationally. Set up costs for the college were successfully crowdfunded initially and it was officially opened by Charles, Prince of Wales, whose charity, the United Kingdom Historic Building Preservation Trust, funded £9 million to restore the historic factory.

== Awards ==
Hammond was awarded an MBE in the 2016 birthday honours list.
