= Michelle Erickson =

American ceramic artist

Michelle Erickson (born 1960) is an American ceramic artist who works with contemporary and reproduction pottery.

== Career ==
Erickson received her BFA in 1982 from the College of William and Mary in Williamsburg, Virginia. After graduating, she worked for a year as a potter the French-Canadian section of the Busch Gardens theme park in Williamsburg. She also took a job running the ceramics studio at the Jamestown Settlement where she began to study and recreate pottery from the archaeological collections at the historic site.

Erickson was the artist in residence at the Victoria and Albert Museum in London, England from July to September 2012.

From October 30, 2021 – April 2, 2023, the Legion of Honor, San Francisco exhibited Michelle Erickson: Wild Porcelain.

Erickson also completed two residencies; one at the Visual Arts Center in Richmond, Virginia, and the other at Starworks in Star and Seagrove, North Carolina. Michelle has a solo exhibition project titled You &I Are …Earth located at Wilton House Museum in Richmond, Virginia. Additionally, she is affiliated with the National Council on Education for the Ceramics Arts, American Craft Council, and American Ceramics Circle.

== Artist's statement ==
"My career-long fascination with ceramic history during the period of Western exploration expansion, and dominion began with exposure to archeological ceramics in the "colonial triangle" of Virginia. Fragments of British, European, Asian, and Native American pottery unearthed in the early colonial excavations embody a remarkable global convergence of cultures in clay. My practice in the rediscovery of lost ceramic techniques and the contexts of this history define my approach as a contemporary artist. I use the depth of history through the art of making to draw parallels through time such as the 18th century Staffordshire pottery industry and global design giant Nike, Wedgewood's abolitionist ceramics and 21st child slavery, the colonial discovery and obsession with fossils as prescient to our perilous addiction to fossil fuels. I make objects of the past from an imagined future in the present."
