= Studio pottery =

Modern hand-made artistic pottery

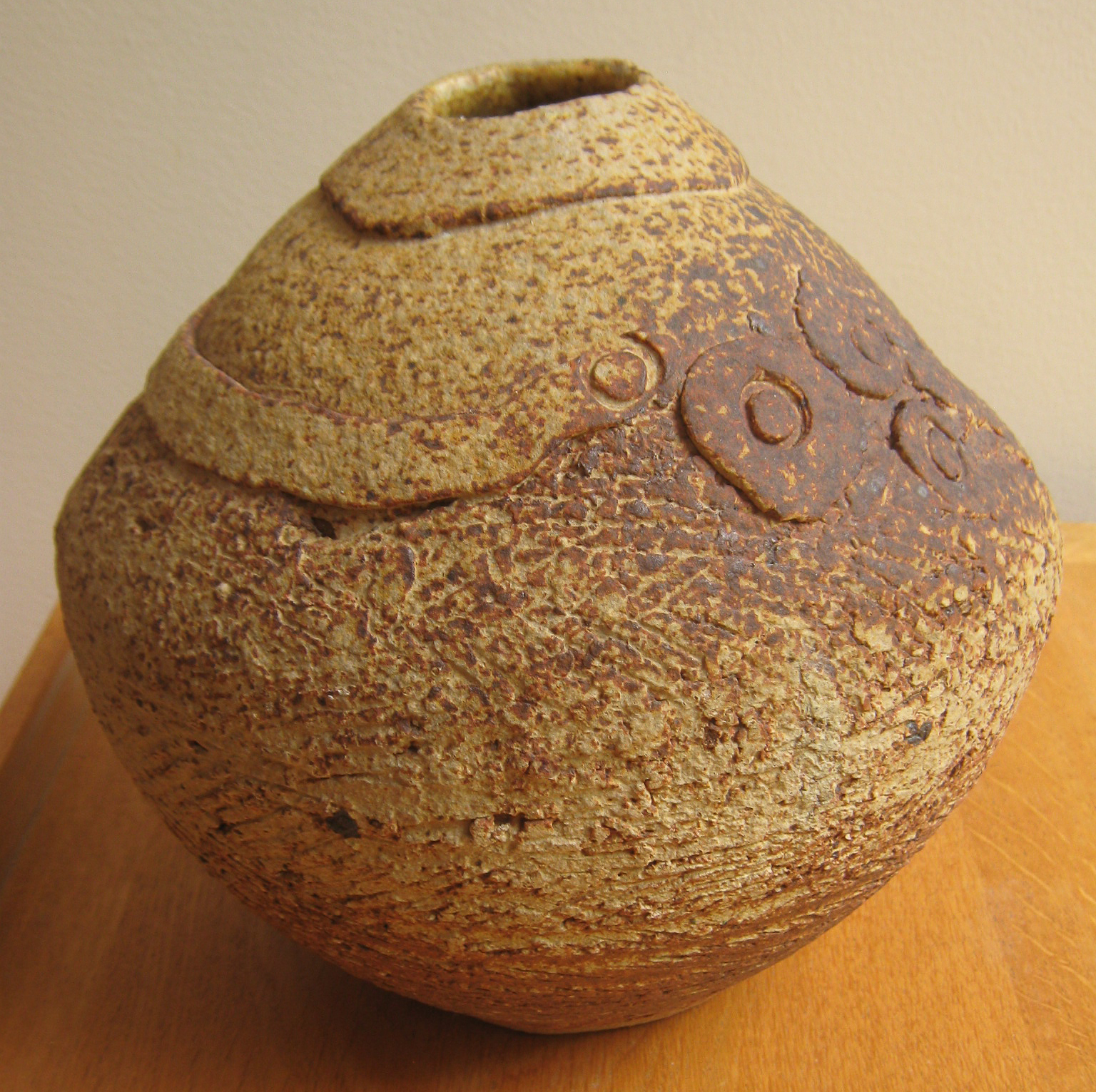
Ian Sprague, spheroidal stoneware vase, Australia, 1970s

Studio pottery is pottery made by professional and amateur ceramists working alone or in small groups, making unique items or short runs, especially those that are not intended for daily use as crockery. Typically, all stages of manufacture are carried out by the artists themselves. Studio pottery includes functional wares such as tableware and cookware, and non-functional wares such as sculpture, with vases and bowls covering the middle ground, often being used only for display. Studio potters can be referred to as ceramic artists, ceramists, ceramicists, or as an artist who uses clay as a medium.

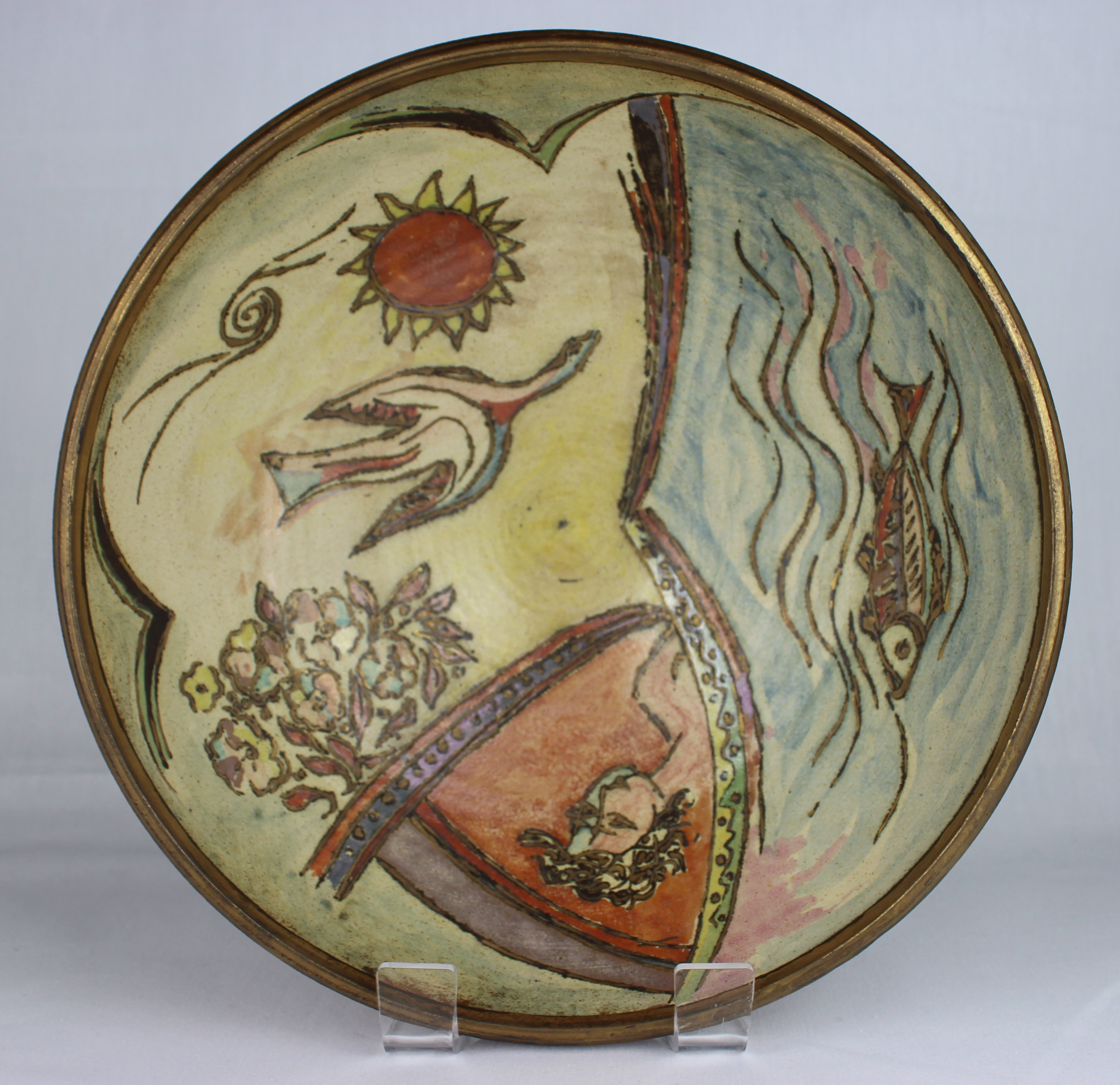
Thrown Bowl by Bernard Forrester, England

Some studio potters now prefer to call themselves ceramic artists, or simply artists. Studio pottery is represented by potters all over the world and has strong roots in Britain. Art pottery is a related term, used by many potteries from about the 1870s onwards, in Britain and North America; it tends to cover larger workshops, where there is a designer supervising the production of skilled workers who may have input into the pieces made. The heyday of British and American art pottery was about 1880 to 1940.

Since the second half of the 20th century ceramics has become more highly valued in the art world. Several large exhibitions worldwide have been held, including the now defunct Sculpture Objects Functional Art and Design (SOFA Chicago and SOFA New York), which included ceramics as an art form. Ceramics have realized high prices, reaching several thousands of pounds for some pieces, in auction houses such as Bonhams and Sotheby's.

Fine artists working in clay have also played a significant role in elevating the medium's status. Notably, between 1947 and 1971, Pablo Picasso produced more than 3,500 unique ceramic works—together with over 600 limited-edition designs—at the Madoura pottery studio in Vallauris, France, working in close collaboration with potters Suzanne and Georges Ramié.

== Pre-1900 ==
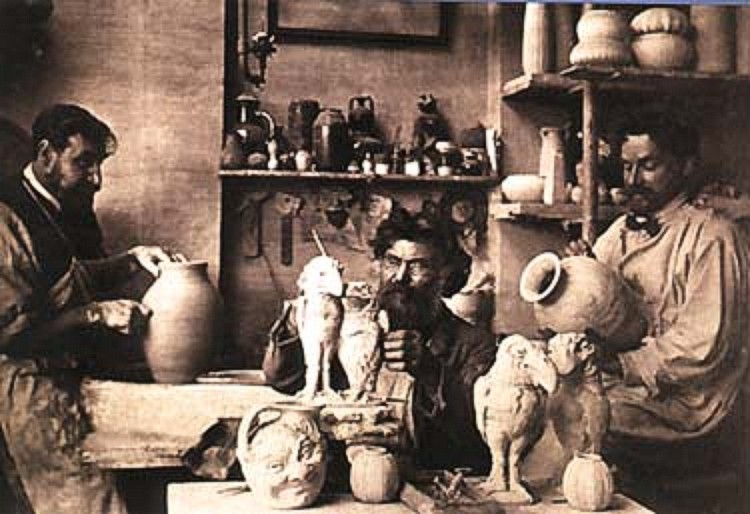
The Martin brothers in their studio

Notable studios included Brannam Pottery, Castle Hedingham Ware, Martin Brothers and Sir Edmund Harry Elton.

== 1900-1960: Development of contemporary British ceramics ==
Several influences contributed to the emergence of studio pottery in the early 20th century: art pottery (for example the work of the Martin Brothers and William Moorcroft); the Arts and Crafts movement, the Bauhaus; a rediscovery of traditional artisan pottery and the excavation of large quantities of Song pottery in China.

Leading trends in British studio pottery in the 20th century are represented by Bernard Leach, William Staite Murray, Waistel Cooper, Dora Billington, Lucie Rie and Hans Coper.

Originally trained as a fine artist, Bernard Leach (1887–1979) established a style of pottery, the ethical pot, strongly influenced by Chinese, Korean, Japanese and medieval English forms. After briefly experimenting with earthenware, he turned to stoneware fired to high temperatures in large oil or wood-burning kilns. This style dominated British studio pottery in the mid-20th century. Leach's influence was disseminated by his writings, in particular A Potter's Book and the apprentice system he ran at his pottery in St Ives, Cornwall, through which many notable studio potters passed. A Potter's Book espoused an anti-industrial, Arts and Crafts ethos, which persists in British studio pottery. Leach taught intermittently at Dartington Hall, Devon from the 1930s.

Other ceramic artists exerted an influence through their positions in art schools. William Staite Murray, who was head of the ceramics department of the Royal College of Art, treated his pots as works of art, exhibiting them with titles in galleries. Dora Billington (1890–1968) studied at Hanley School of Art, worked in the pottery industry and was latterly head of pottery at the Central School of Arts and Crafts. She worked in media that Leach did not, e.g. tin-glazed earthenware, and influenced potters such as William Newland Margaret Hine, Nicholas Vergette and Alan Caiger-Smith.

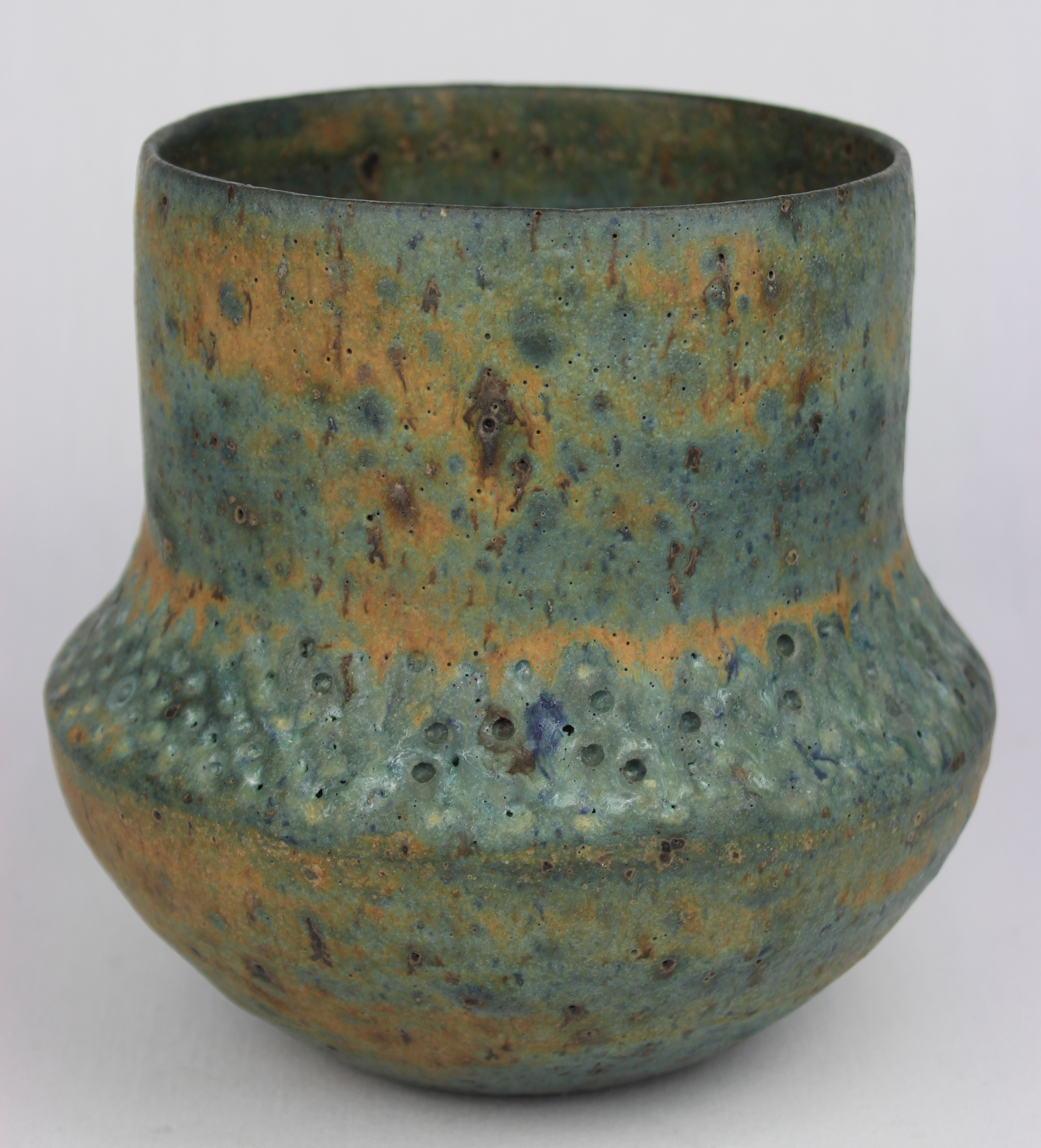
Thrown vase by Lucie Rie

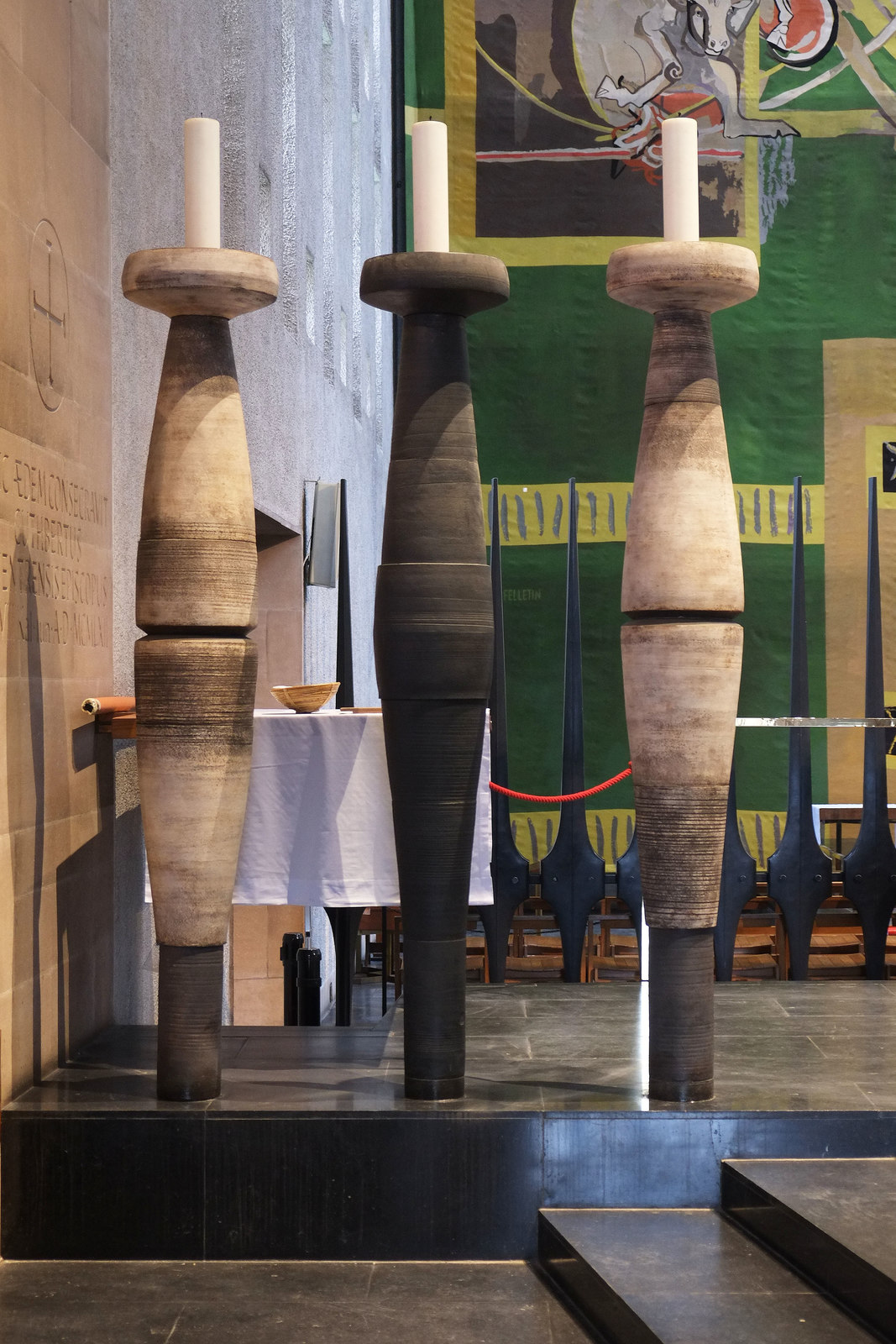
Monumental ceramic altar candlesticks by Hans Coper at Coventry Cathedral (1962)

Lucie Rie (1902–1995) came to London in 1938 as a refugee from Austria. She had studied at the Vienna Kunstgewerbeschule and has been regarded as essentially a modernist. Rie experimented and produced new glaze effects. She was a friend of Leach and was greatly impressed by his approach, especially about the "completeness" of a pot. The bowls and bottles which she specialised in are finely potted and sometimes brightly coloured. She taught at Camberwell College of Arts from 1960 until 1972.

Hans Coper (1920–1981), also a refugee, worked with Rie before moving to a studio in Hertfordshire. His work is sculptural, unglazed, and largely non-functional, though it often retained the form of a vessel. In the early 1960s, he was commissioned to produce large ceramic candlesticks for Coventry Cathedral. Coper taught at Camberwell College of Arts from 1960 to 1969, where he influenced Ewen Henderson, and at the Royal College of Art (RCA) from 1966 to 1975. At the RCA, his students included Elizabeth Fritsch, Alison Britton, Jacqui Poncelet, Carol McNicoll, Geoffrey Swindell, Jill Crowley, and Glenys Barton, a cohort known for moving British studio pottery toward sculptural, non-utilitarian forms.

After the Second World War, studio pottery in Britain was encouraged by two forces: the wartime ban on decorating manufactured pottery and the modernist spirit of the Festival of Britain. Studio potters provided consumers with an alternative to plain industrial ceramics. Their simple, functional designs chimed in with the modernist ethos. Cranks restaurant, which opened in 1961, used Winchombe pottery throughout, which Tanya Harrod describes as "handsome, functional with pastoral but up to date air". Cranks represented the look of the period. Elizabeth David's food revolution of the post-war years was associated with a similar kitchen look and added to the demand for hand-made tableware.

Harrod notes that several potteries were formed in response to this fifties boom. There was in turn a demand for potters trained in workshop practice and able to throw quickly. As this training was not offered by the art schools of the period, the Harrow Art School studio pottery diploma was created to fill the gap. According to Harrod, "the production potter of the Harrow type had a good innings well into the seventies", by which time the market for this style of pottery was falling away.

== 1960s-present: Modern British potters ==
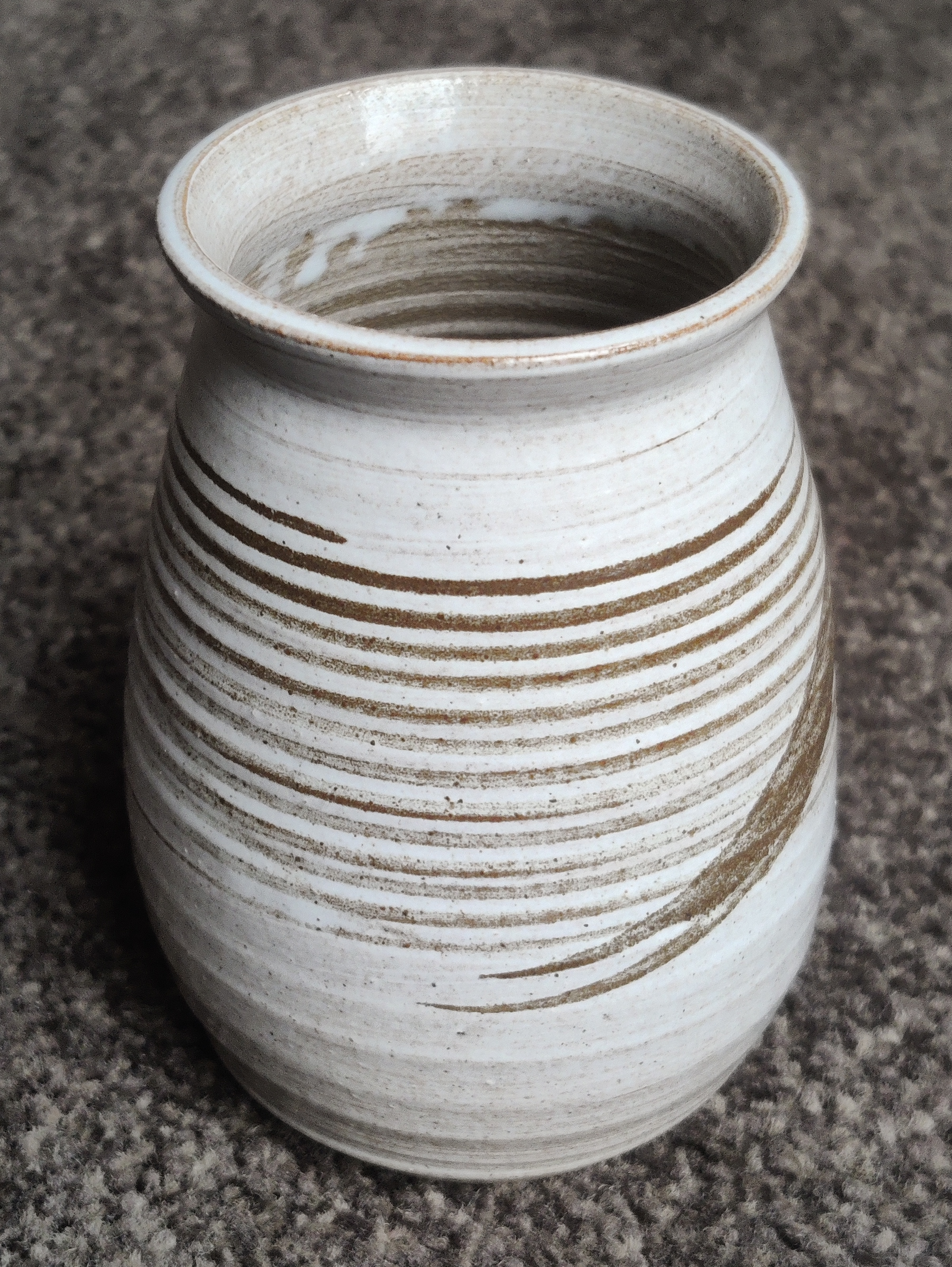
vase (10cm tall) made by Pog Crafts of Cardington, Bedfordshire.

From the 1960s onwards, a new generation of potters, influenced by Camberwell School of Art and the Central School of Art and Design including Ewen Henderson, Alison Britton, Elizabeth Fritsch, Gordon Baldwin and Ruth Duckworth began to experiment\abstract ceramic objects, varied surface and glaze effects to critical acclaim. Elizabeth Fritsch has work represented in major collections and museums worldwide.

The number of potters increased in the mid-1970s the Craft Potters Association had 147 members, and by the mid-1990s it had 306.

== British organisations ==
The representative body for studio pottery artists in the United Kingdom is the Craft Potters Association, which has a members' showroom in Great Russell Street, London WC1, and publishes a journal, Ceramic Review.

== US studio pottery ==
Pottery had been an integral part of the United States Arts and Crafts movement in the late 19th century and early 20th century.

A major figure in the growth of this movement was Charles Fergus Binns, who served as the first director of the New York State School of Clay-Working at Alfred University. Binns was a British potter who had previously worked at the Royal Worcester Porcelain Works. After emigrating to the United States he was recruited to direct the new program at Alfred University, and over the next three decades he helped it grow into one of the most prestigious ceramic arts programs in the nation.

Some potters in the United States adopted the approach from emerging studio pottery movements in Britain and Japan. In addition, American folk pottery of the southeastern United States was seen as an American contribution to studio pottery. University programs at Ohio State University, under the direction of Arthur Eugene Baggs in 1928 and under Glen Lukens in 1936 at the University of Southern California, began training ceramic students in presenting clay ware as art. Baggs had been intimately involved in the Arts and Crafts movement and, during the 1930s, he revived interest in the salt glazing method for studio pottery. Karl Martz was a student of Baggs.

European artists coming to the United States contributed to the public appreciation of pottery as art, and included Marguerite Wildenhain, Maija Grotell, Susi Singer and Gertrude and Otto Natzler. Significant studio potters in the United States include George E. Ohr, Otto and Vivika Heino, Karl Martz, Warren MacKenzie, Paul Soldner, Peter Voulkos and Beatrice Wood.

=== US organizations ===
- National Council on Education for the Ceramic Arts

== Museum studio pottery collections ==
Canada

- Gardiner Museum

United Kingdom

- Birmingham Museum & Art Gallery in Birmingham, England
- Sainsbury Centre for Visual Arts at the University of East Anglia in Norwich, England
- Swindon Museum and Art Gallery
- Victoria and Albert Museum in London, England
- York Art Gallery in York

United States of America

- American Museum of Ceramic Art in Pomona, California
- Schein–Joseph International Museum of Ceramic Art, Alfred University, New York
- Scripps College, Ruth Chandler Williamson Gallery The Marer Collection of Contemporary Ceramics in Claremont, California
- University of Michigan Museum of Art in Ann Arbor, Michigan

Australia

- National Museum of Australian Pottery
- National Gallery of Victoria
