= Elizabeth Fritsch =

British ceramic artist (born 1940)

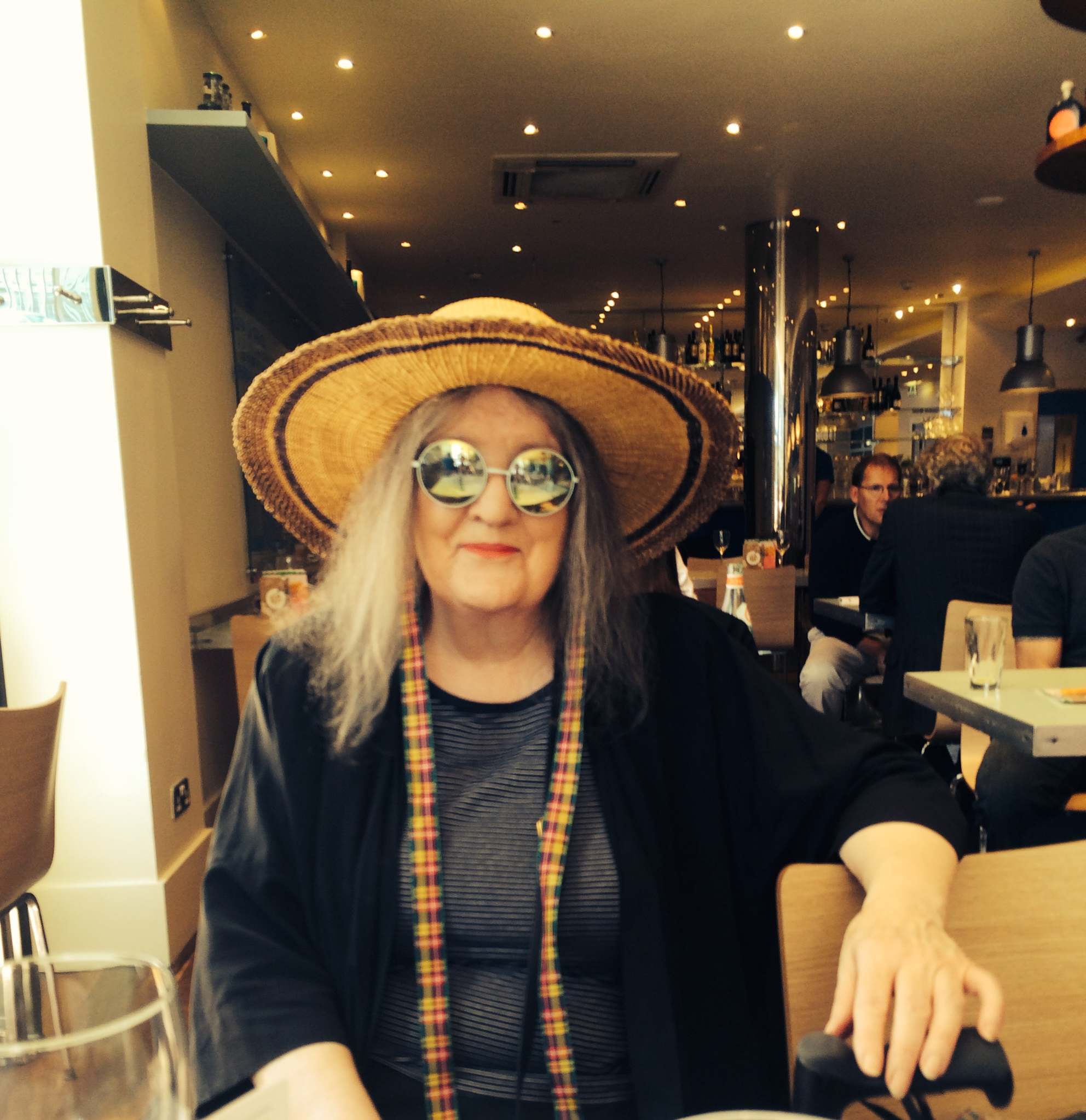
- Born: Elizabeth Hughes; 1940 (age 85–86); Whitchurch, Shropshire, England
- Education: Birmingham School of Music; Royal Academy of Music; Royal College of Art
- Known for: Studio pottery; Ceramic Art
- Movement: Contemporary; Modern Art
- Spouse: Jean Mathis-Fritsch (m. 1966; div. 1971)
- Children: 2
- Awards: CBE
- Elected: Senior Fellow Royal College of Art
- Website: www.elizabethfritsch.com

Elizabeth Fritsch CBE (born 1940) is a British studio potter and ceramic artist born into a Welsh family in Whitchurch on the Shropshire border. Her innovative hand built and painted pots are often influenced by ideas from music, painting, literature, landscape and architecture.

== Biography ==
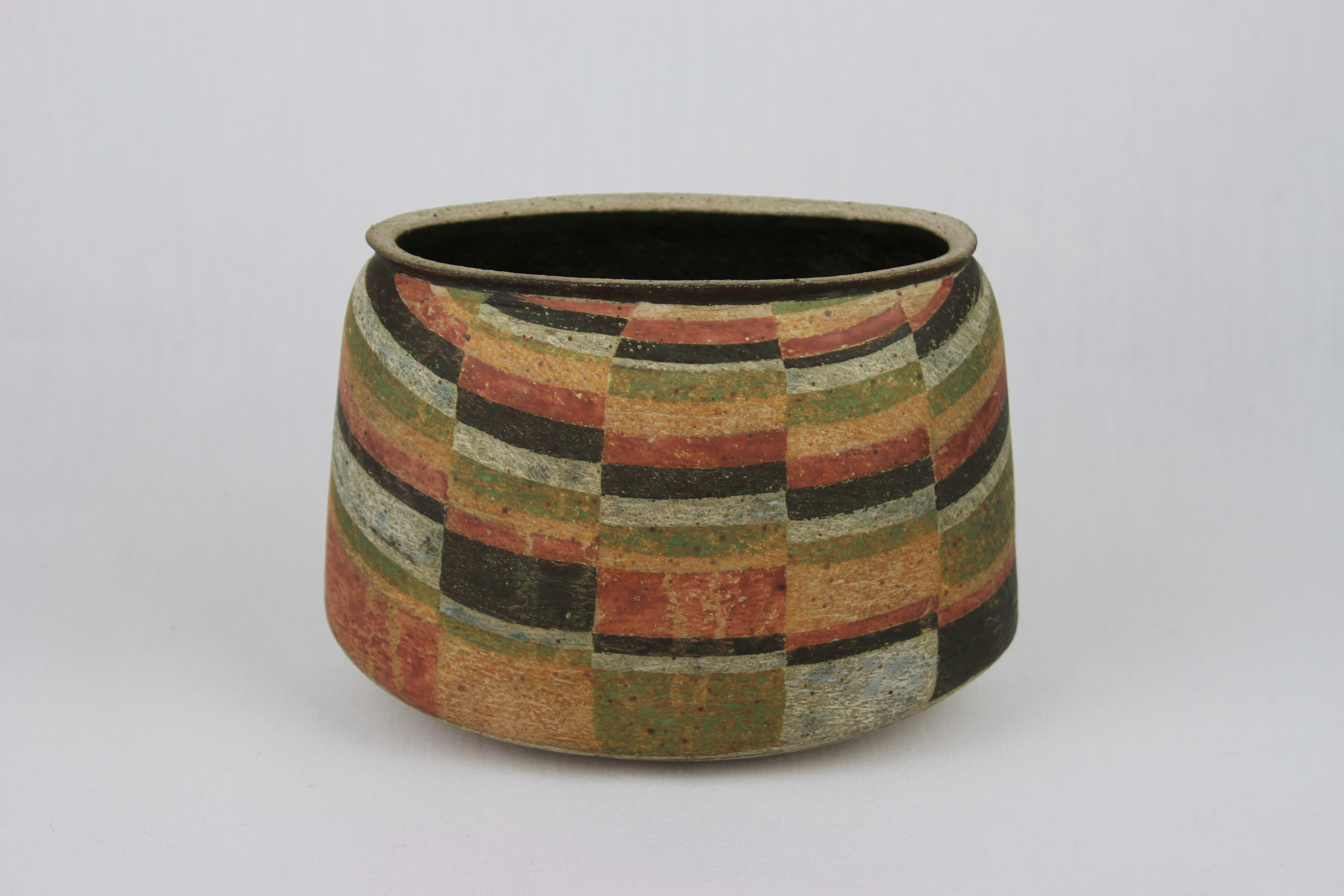
Hand-built pot by Elizabeth Fritsch

Elizabeth Fritsch is a studio potter and ceramic artist. She uses fine technically proficient hand built coiling techniques; architectural ceramic form, optical effects and surface design which, are usually hand painted with coloured slips. The stoneware are biscuit fired and often re-fired a number of times. Each Fritsch pot is unique, individual and distinctive. They are usually displayed in selected groups and themes set to the artist's requirements.

Fritsch initially studied at the Birmingham School of Music studying harp, and then piano at the Royal Academy of Music from 1958 to 1964; but she later took up ceramics under Hans Coper and Eduardo Paolozzi at the Royal College of Art from 1968 to 1971. Adopting her career name from her marriage to Jean Mathis-Fritsch (m.1966-71) she had a son Bertie born in 1966. In the seventies Fritsch, was one of the first of a group of progressive 'New Ceramics' to emerge from the Royal College of Art, along with other ceramicists including Alison Britton, Carol McNicoll and Jacqueline Poncelet. Under David Queensbury, the group formed a shift and influence in British ceramic art, breaking away from the more traditional forms, colour, design and function of the more utilitarian ceramics that had preceded. Fritsch lived and worked at Digswell Arts Trust from 1975 to 1983. Her daughter Ruby Hughes was born in 1980 and in the same year was awarded the John Ruskin Bursary for a fictional archaeology project. This project went into developing an important new body of work and shift in the artist career.'Pots from Nowhere'(fictional archaeology) was shown at the Royal College of Art by Queensberry Hunt in 1984.

In 1985, Fritsch set up a studio in London. Since her first show in 1972, Fritsch has had a number of solo shows. In 1996 and 2001 she was shortlisted for the Jerwood Prize for Ceramics. Fritsch's work is represented in major art collections and museums in more than nine countries and her work is represented in major British art museum collections. A major retrospective was held at the National Museum Cardiff, in 2010, featuring a complete range of her most significant studio pottery and recent pieces. Since the late 1970s Fritsch has considered "the space between the second and third dimensions", in her work; a concept she first described as "two-and-a-half dimensions" with her distinctive rhythmic patterns and optical effects. Dynamic Structures: Painted Vessels also marked her 70th birthday. A co-curated solo exhibition of selected studio works was presented at Frieze Masters - Frieze Art Fair in October 2023 at Regents Park, London by Adrian Sassoon Gallery, October 11-15th 2023 within Luke Syson's Stand Out section exploring the juxtapositions and use of colour.

Fritsch is to have a major survey exhibition of her work and career at The Hepworth Wakefield in March 2025 entitled Otherworldly Vessels

== Awards ==
- 2001: Shortlisted for Jerwood Prize for Applied Arts 2001: Ceramics
- 1996: Shortlisted for Jerwood Prize for Applied Arts 1996: Ceramics
- 1995: Awarded CBE:Commander of the British Empire
- 1995: Elected Senior Fellowship, Royal College of Art
- 1993: Gold Medali, Visuelle Spiele, International Handwerksmesse München, Germany
- 1987: Bernard Leach Centenary Post Office Stamp issue with Hans Coper & Lucie Rie
- 1980: John Ruskin Bursary for Fictional Archaeology project
- 1976: Gold Medal, International Ceramics Competition, Sopot, Poland
- 1972: Prize Winner, Royal Copenhagen Jubilee
- 1970: Silver Medal Royal College of Art: Herbert Read Memorial Prize

== Museum and public collections ==
- Aberystwyth Arts Centre, Aberystwyth, Wales
- Aberdeen Art Gallery & Museum, Aberdeen
- Birmingham Museum and Art Gallery, Birmingham
- Bolton Museum and Art Gallery, Bolton
- Bristol City Museum and Art Gallery, Bristol
- British Council, Great Britain
- Crafts Council, London
- Laing Art Gallery, Newcastle, Tyne & Wear
- Lotherton Hall, Leeds, Yorkshire
- Manchester Art Gallery, Manchester
- Middlesbrough Institute of Modern Art, Middlesbrough
- National Museums Liverpool, Merseyside
- National Museum of Scotland, Edinburgh
- National Museum of Wales,
- Norwich Castle Museum & Art Gallery, Norwich
- The Fitzwilliam Museum, Cambridge
- Victoria and Albert Museum, London
- York Art Gallery, York
- Kunstindustrimuseet, Copenhagen, Denmark
- Musée des Arts Décoratifs, Paris, France
- Museum für Kunst und Gewerbe Hamburg, Germany
- Museum of Design, Zürich Museum Bellerive, Zurich, Switzerland
- Metropolitan Museum of Art, New York
- National Gallery of Australia, Canberra, Australia
- National Gallery of Victoria, Melbourne, Australia
- Art Gallery of South Australia, Adelaide, Australia
- National Museum of Modern Art, Tokyo, Japan

== Solo exhibitions ==
- 2025: Elisabeth Fritsch: Otherworldy Vessels, The Hepworth Wakefield, Wakefield, 8 March 2025.
- 2023: Frieze Masters Art Fair 2023, The Regents Park, London. Adrian Sassoon Gallery, October 11-15th 2023
- 2010 Retrospective: National Museum Cardiff, Wales, UK. Dynamic Structures: Painted Vessels, October 2010– January
- 2008: Fine Art Society - London November -December.
- 2007: Retrospective, Bonhams, London
- 2007: Anthony Hepworth Gallery, Bath
- 2000: Metaphysical Vessels, Mobilia Gallery, Cambridge, Massachusetts
- 2000: Memory of Architecture, Part II, Besson Gallery, London
- 1998: Sea Pieces, Contemporary Applied Arts, London
- 1995–96: Retrospective touring to Munich, Karlsruhe, Halle and Bellerive, Zurich
- 1995: Metaphysical Pots, Bellerive Museum
- 1994–95: Order and Chaos, Bellas Artes, Santa Fe, New Mexico
- 1994: Osiris Gallery, Brussels
- 1993–1995: Vessels from Another World, Northern Centre for the Contemporary Arts, Sunderland, travelling to Aberdeen, Birmingham, Cardiff, London, Norwich, UK
- 1992–93: Retrospective, Pilscheur Fine Art, London
- 1991: Hetjens Museum, Düsseldorf, Germany
- 1990: Cross Rhythms and Counterpoint, Edinburgh, Scotland
- 1978: Pots about Music, Leeds Galleries, Temple Newsham; travelled to Glasgow, Bristol, Gateshead, Bolton, and V&A, London
- 1976: British Craft Centre, London
- 1974: Waterloo Place Gallery, London
- 1972: Bing and Grondahl, Copenhagen

== Bibliography ==
1. Edward Lucie-Smith on Elizabeth Fritsch: Vessels from another World, Metaphysical pots Painted Stoneware, Bellew Publishing, 1993. ISBN 1-85725-098-2 ISBN 978-1-85725-098-5
2. Peter Dormer and David Cripps “Elizabeth Fritsch in Studio – A view”, In Studio Series, Bellew, London, 1985. ISBN 978-0-947792-04-6
3. Elizabeth Fritsch, Pots about Music. Authors: Elizabeth Fritsch, David Cripps, Leeds City Art Gallery (England), David Queensberry, Alison Britton, Ian Bennett. Publisher, Leeds Art Galleries, 1978, ASIN B0007AT9X2
4. E. Cameron & P. Lewis, Potters on Pottery, Elizabeth Fritsch, pgs. 62-69 Evans Brothers, London 1976. ISBN 0-312-63280-0

== Articles ==
1. The Wall Street Journal "A New Spin on Ceramics" by Margaret Studer, 18 May 2006
2. Moira Vincentelli Women & Ceramics, Gendered Vessels, Manchester University Press, 2000, p. 249. ISBN 0-7190-3840-5, ISBN 978-0-7190-3840-2
3. Garth Clark The Potter's Art, Phaidon 1995, pp. 200–201. ISBN 0-7148-3202-2, ISBN 978-0-7148-3202-9
4. John Houston The Abstract Pot forms of expression and decoration by nine artist potters, Bellew Publishing, 1991.
5. Fischer Fine Art (1986) Nine Potters: Bernard Leach, Katherine Pleydell-Bouverie, Michael Cardew, Hans Coper, Lucie Rie, Elizabeth Fritsch, Ewen Henderson, Elizabeth Raeburn, Claudi Casanovas, Catalogue of an exhibition held at Fisher Fine Art, 1986. ASIN B001ON0RX2
6. John Russell Taylor, "Elizabeth Fritsch: Pots About Music" Ceramic Review, 58 Jul/Aug 1979 pgs 30–33.
7. J.D.H. Catleugh "Recent Pots: Improvisations from Earth to Air", Ceramic Review, 44 Mar/Apr 1977 pg 7.

== Broadcasts and podcasts ==
British Library, Sounds Oral History, On 6 July 2004, (1 of 14) National Life Stories Collection: Crafts' Lives

BBC Private Passions, Classic Arts Production, On 14 April 2001 Michael Berkeley's guest was Elizabeth Fritsch

Victoria and Albert Museum, London, Ceramic Points of View: 'Optical Pot', by Elizabeth Fritsch Video Podcasts
