= Brunsdon =

Brunsdon is a British name. Notable people with this surname include:

- John Brunsdon (born 1933), English printmaker
- William Brunsdon Yapp (1909–1990), English zoologist and writer

It is also a rare first name:

- Charles Brunsdon Fletcher (1859–1946), English-born Australian surveyor and journalist
