= Martin Brothers =

London pottery manufacturer 1873–1914

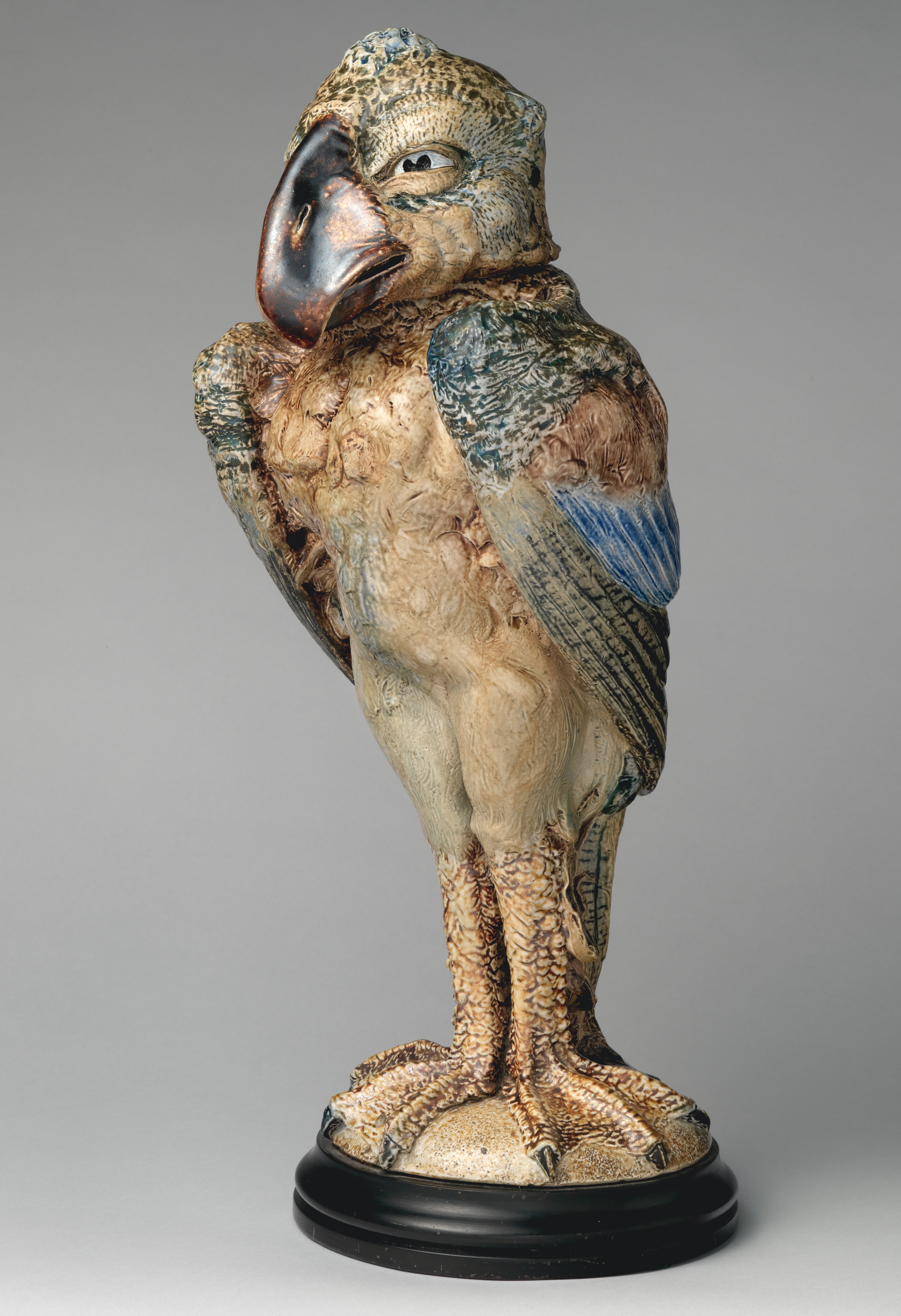
Martin Brothers "Bird", 1896; with wood base, 20 1/4 in., 51.4 cm high, weight of pottery 15 lb

The four Martin Brothers were pottery manufacturers in London from 1873 to 1914. In their own day their Martinware was described as art pottery, and they were one of the earliest potteries making this, but in modern terms they fit better into the studio pottery category, which was invented later.

The four brothers (Wallace, Walter, Charles and Edwin) produced a distinctive type of stoneware pottery from the 1870s through to 1914, when their pottery closed, with a little work being produced through to 1923, when the last brother, Robert Wallace Martin, died. Their output included both vessels and figures. They were best known for their bird sculptures and bowls, vessels decorated with sea creatures, and tiles, fashioned in a whimsical but highly skillful style. The "Wally Birds" vary, and do not represent any actual species, but generally have a large and rather fierce-looking beak, massive feet and talons, and a quizzical look in their large eyes, which have a rather human shape. Their heads lift off to reveal a cavity in the body, generally intended to store pipe tobacco.

Martinware, especially the sculptural pieces, is very popular with collectors, and as of 2015 the record auction price was US$196,000 for a bird jar. In December 2018, a large anthropomorphic grinning crab was sold at Phillips in New York for a hammer price of $220,000 (£184,000). It was subject to a temporary export ban from the UK and with the help of the Art Fund was purchased for £260,700 (total buyer’s costs plus VAT). It is now on display at The Box museum, Plymouth, which has over 100 examples of Martinware.

== History, wares and technique ==
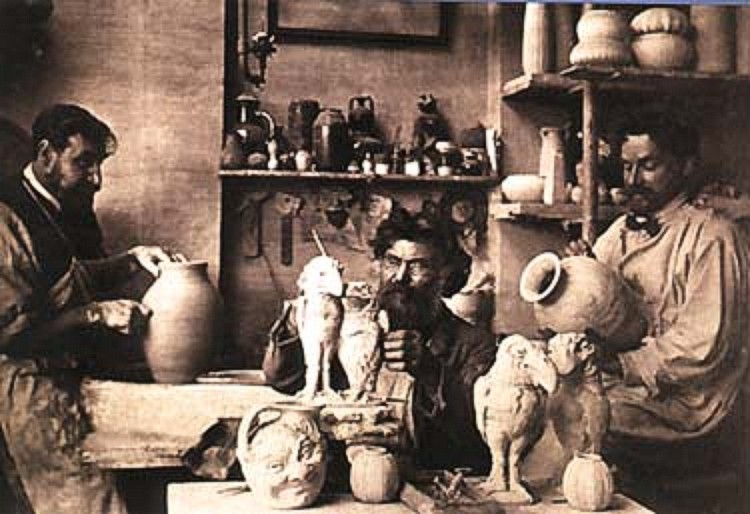
Walter F. Martin, Robert Wallace Martin and Edwin Martin

The Pottery was started in Fulham, London in 1873 by Robert Wallace Martin (1843–1923), who had trained as a sculptor. In 1877 the business was moved to Havelock Road, in the London suburb of Southall, Middlesex, where it remained and several of the brothers were ultimately buried in the cemetery along the road. Walter Fraser Martin (1857–1912) supplied the technical expertise, specializing in coloured glazes and became the firm's specialist on the wheel; Edwin Bruce Martin (1860–1915) was the thrower and decorator whose work included most of the fish and flower designs; and Charles Douglas Martin (1846–1910) managed the shop. This was at 16 Brownlow St, High Holborn, and opened in 1878, but closed after a fire there in 1903.

They worked mainly with a saltglaze stoneware, fired at a high-temperature with salt thrown into the kiln during firing to create the ceramic glaze, which fused with the clay and gave a surface which could be glassy or matt depending on the conditions of each firing. Whereas many stoneware glazes are coloured and obscure the body underneath, the saltglaze method served to highlight the impressed and incised decoration on the surface of their pots. The colours included browns, greens, greys and blues, and this subdued palette is distinctive of Martinware.

Their most flamboyant design period was from about 1880–1900, and after 1900 their designs simplified somewhat, under the influence of Art Nouveau and Japonism.

Robert Wallace Martin, the oldest brother, had worked for a while for the architectural sculptor J. B. Phillips of Vauxhall Bridge Road, and later took drawing classes at the nearby Lambeth School of Art. Walter and Edwin Martin also studied there, and both worked for a time at the Royal Doulton Pottery, also in Lambeth.

The chancel arch in Ayot St Peter’s Church in Hertfordshire, is the only commission by the Martin Brothers for a church.

== Collections and exhibitions ==
Martinware pottery may be found in various ceramic museum collections. Up until its closure in 2015, Pitshanger Manor displayed a wide range of their work in the Manor's Hull Grundy Collection, based in Ealing . The remaining Martinware collection is now on display at the Southall Library in the Dominion Centre. A small selection is on show in the Norwich Castle museum. The Potteries Museum & Art Gallery exhibits examples of Martinware in its Art Pottery cases.

An exhibition, "The Martin Brothers Potters", at Sotheby's Belgravia in 1978 did much to revive interest. There were Martinware exhibitions at the Cuming Museum, London in 2013 and Standen (National Trust) in 2016.

== Collectors ==
Martinware has been popular with collectors, especially since the 1970s. A new record auction price of US$196,000 was set in 2015 (Phillips, New York) for a 14 inch high "wally bird" jar from 1889, supposedly one of a few caricaturing Benjamin Disraeli. The previous record was £75,000 for another bird jar of 1898 (Woolley & Wallis, 2014).

More typical prices for bird jars and good size vases were in the £10-20,000 range in 2018.

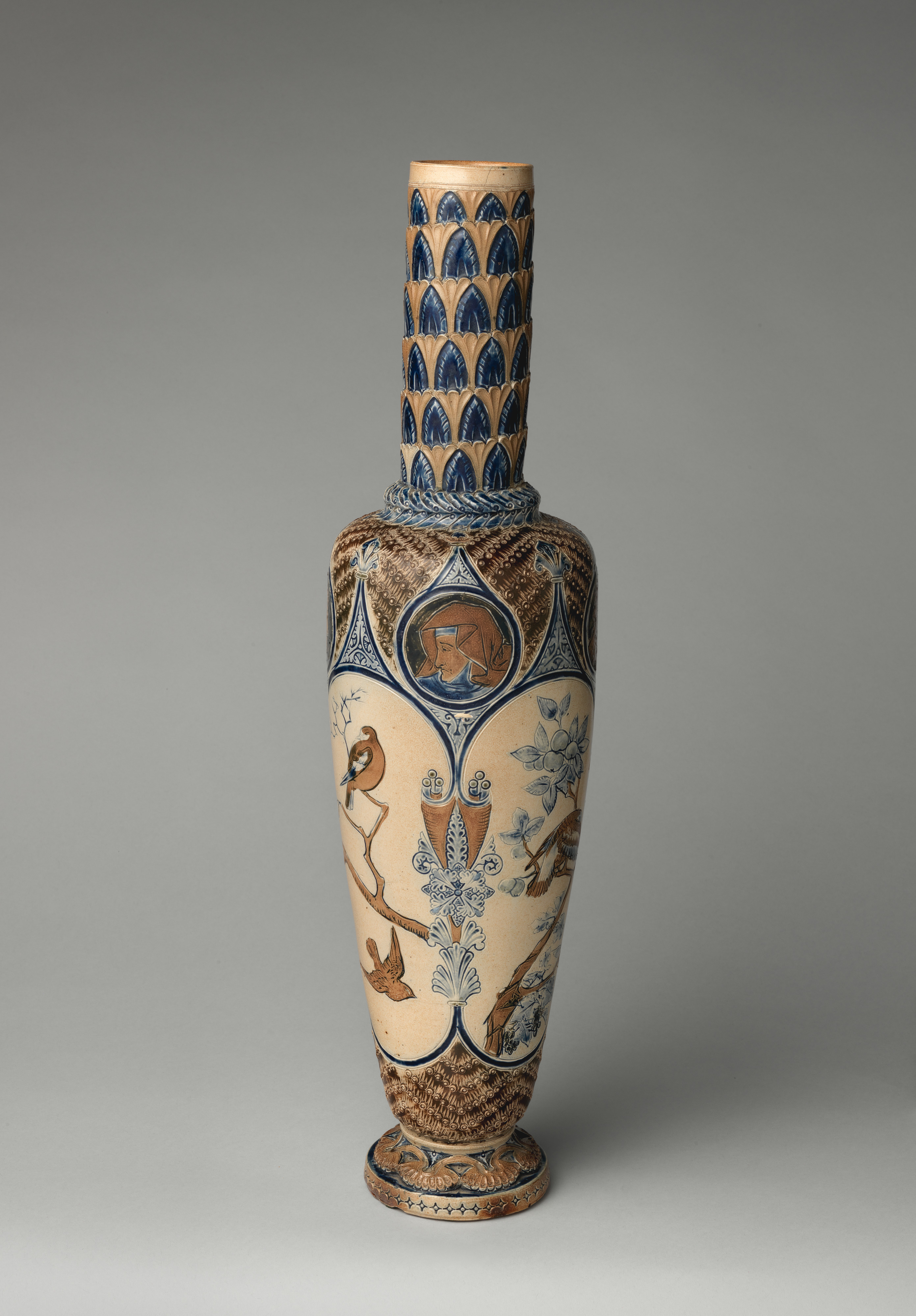
Vase with birds and portrait, 1876, c. 23 in, 54 cm tall

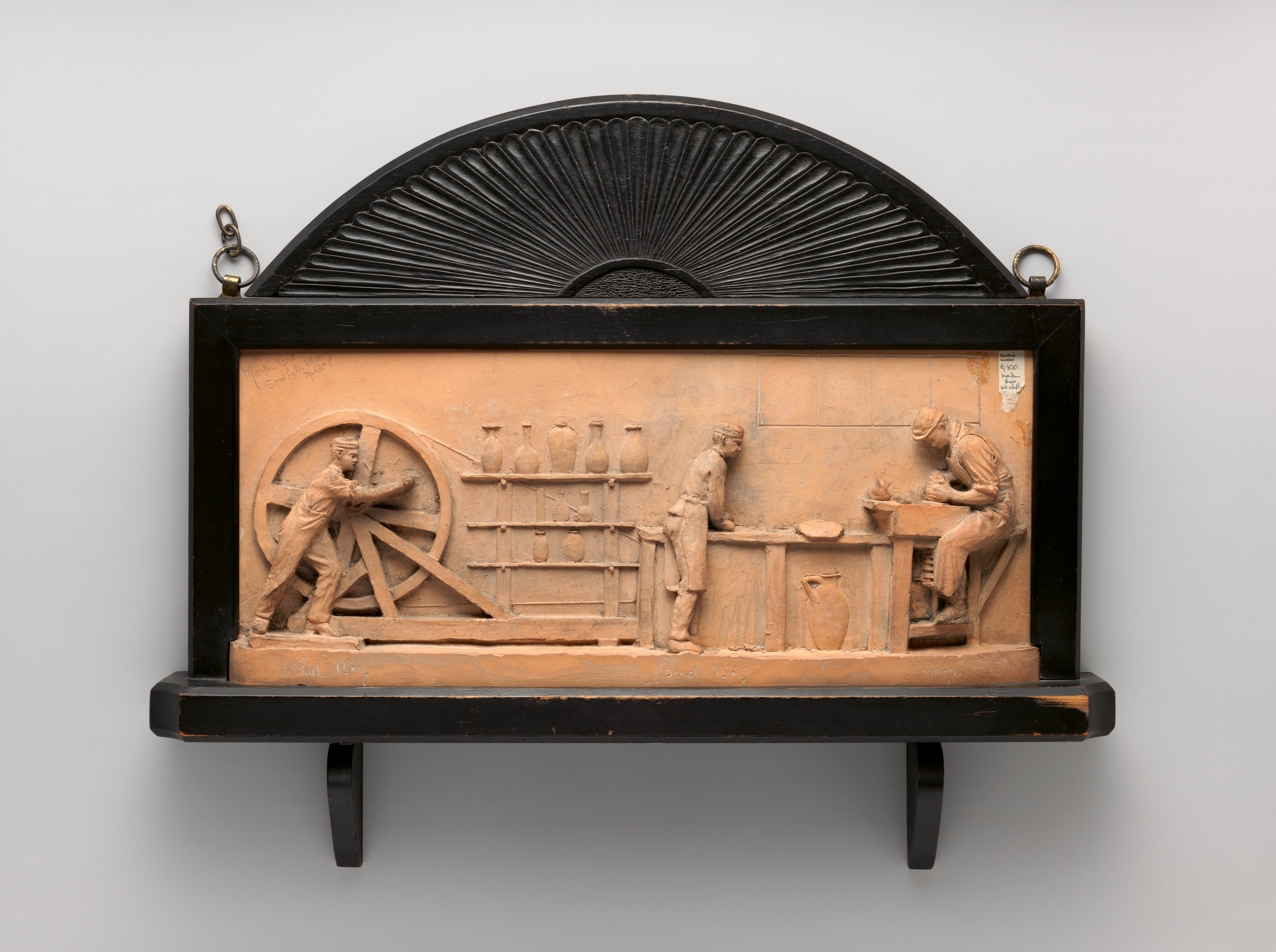
Somewhat untypical terracotta plaque (wood frame) depicting a pottery workshop, c. 1882

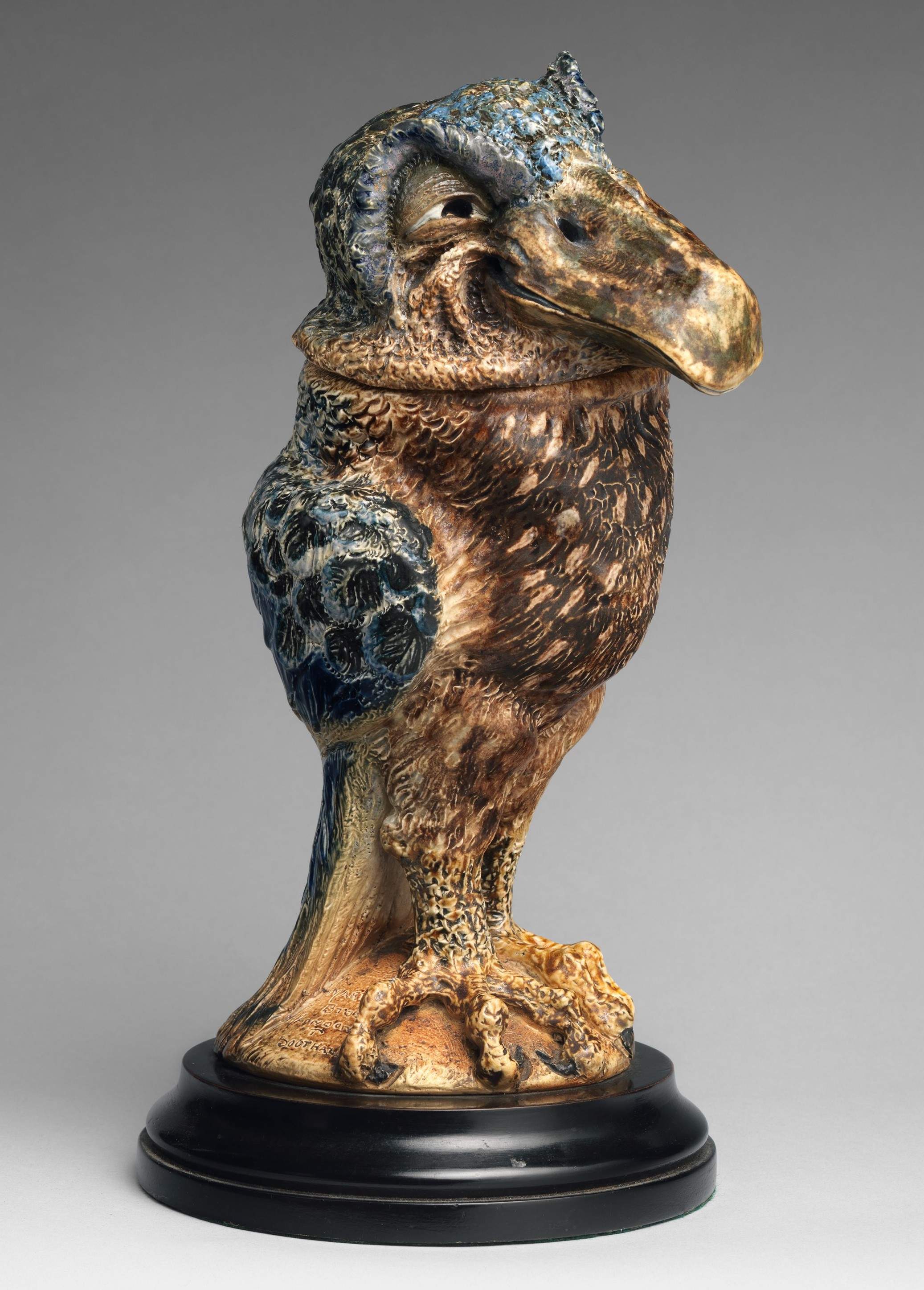
Wally bird jar, 1888, 12 3/16 in., 31 cm high, on base.

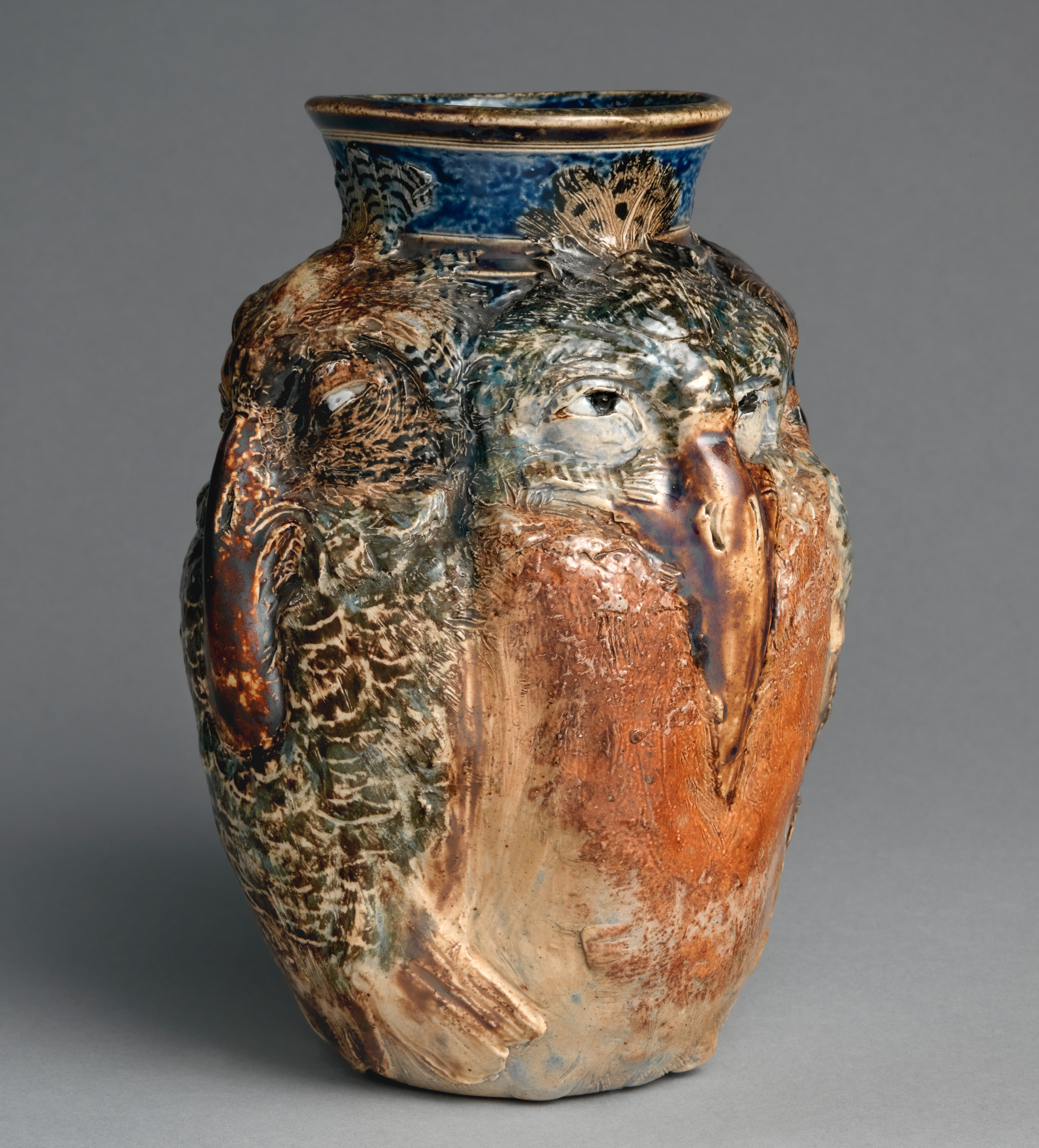
Jar with four birds, 1892, 8 5/16 in., 21.1 cm tall

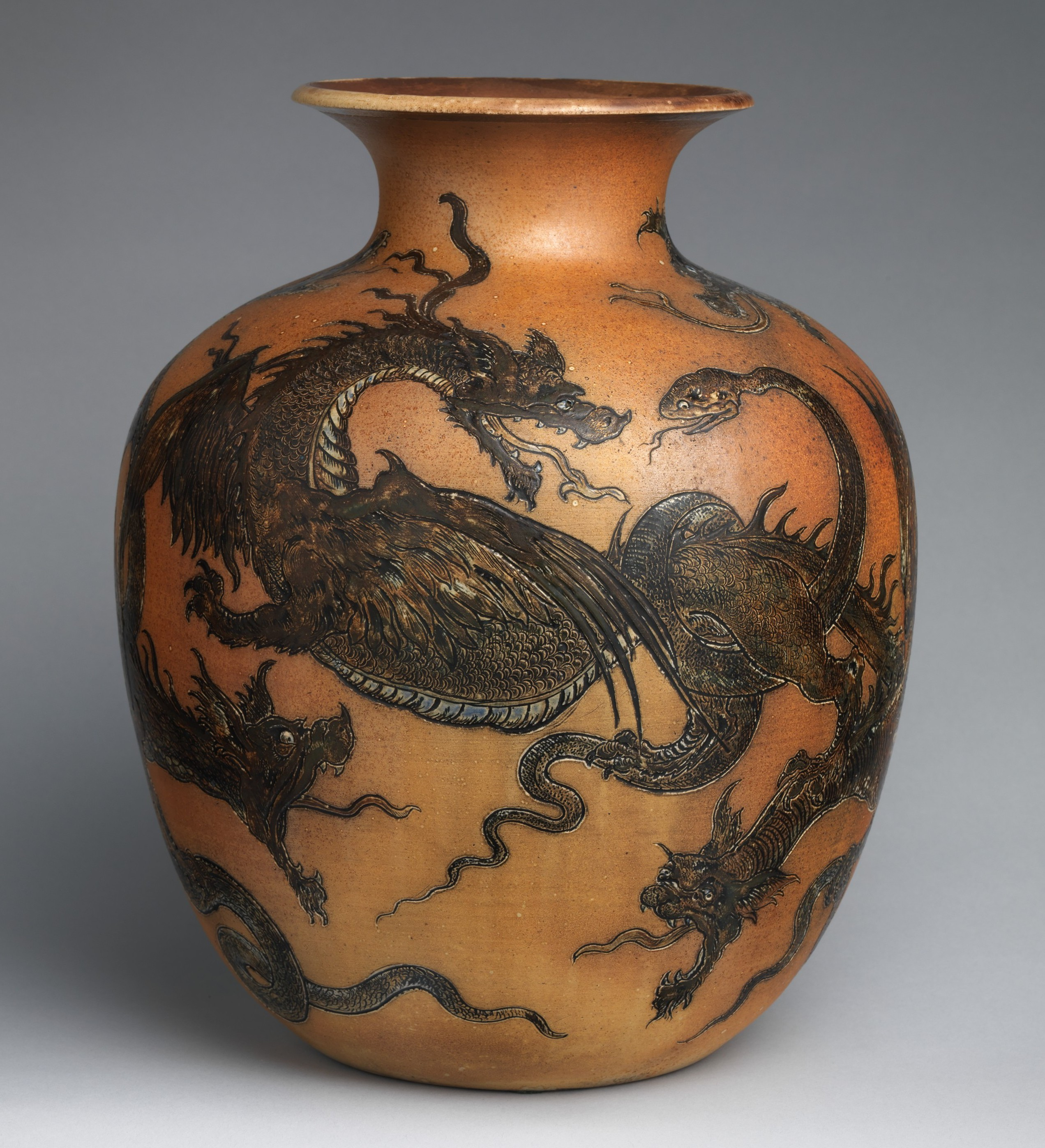
Pot with dragons, 1894

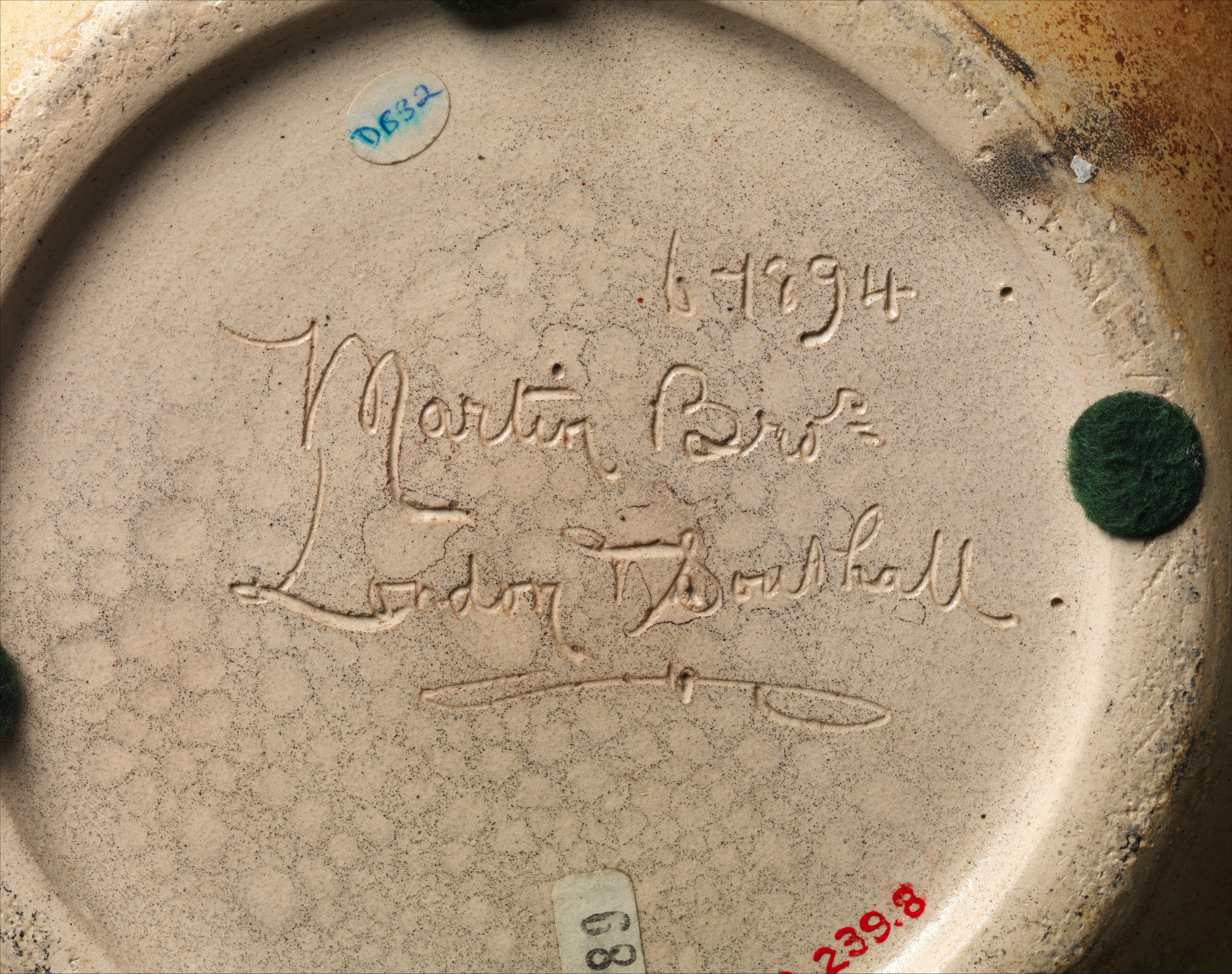
Pot with dragons, 1894, inscribed base

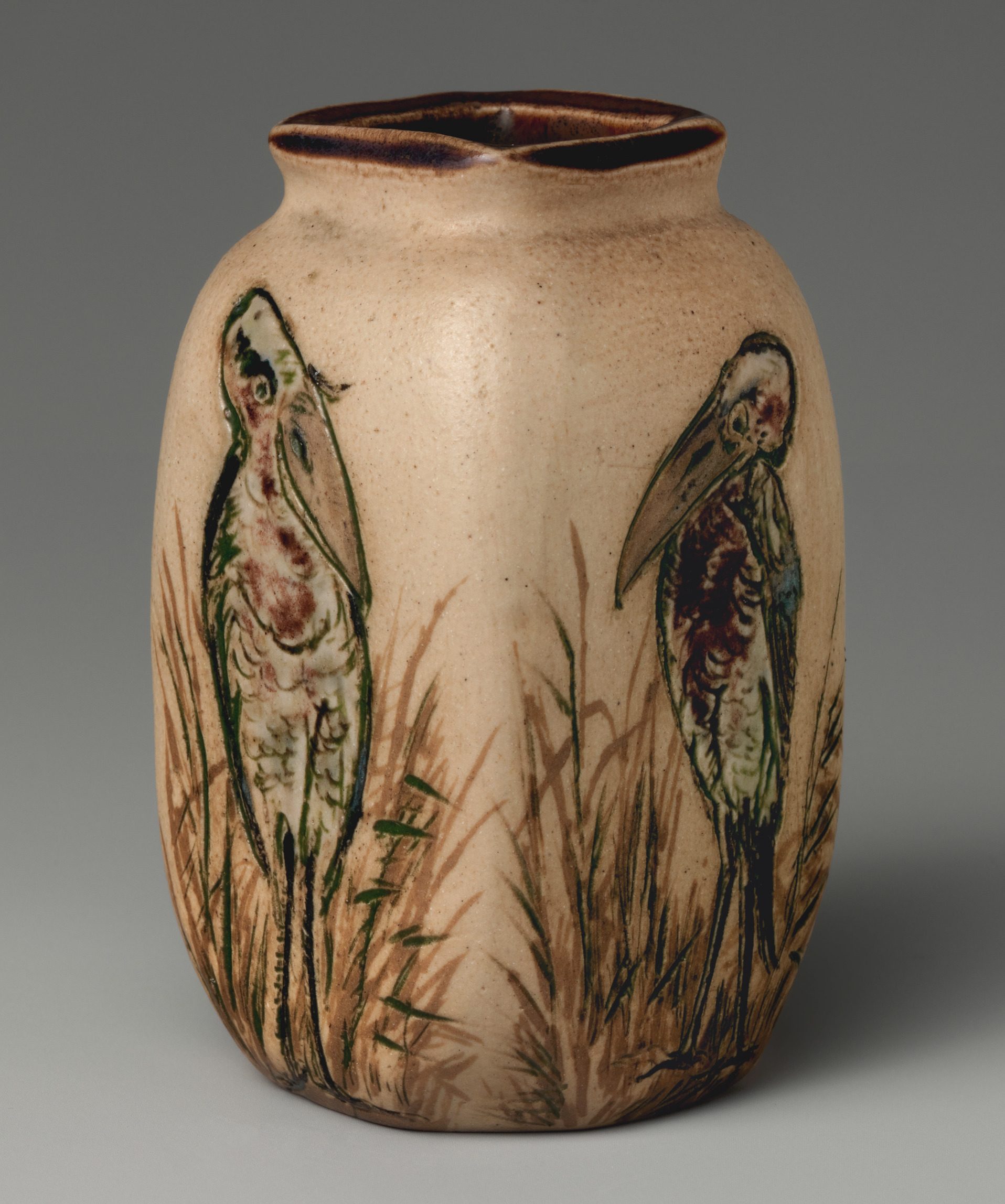
Small vase with birds, 1905, c. 3 in, 8 cm tall
