= Wally Bird =

Decorative ceramic tobacco jar

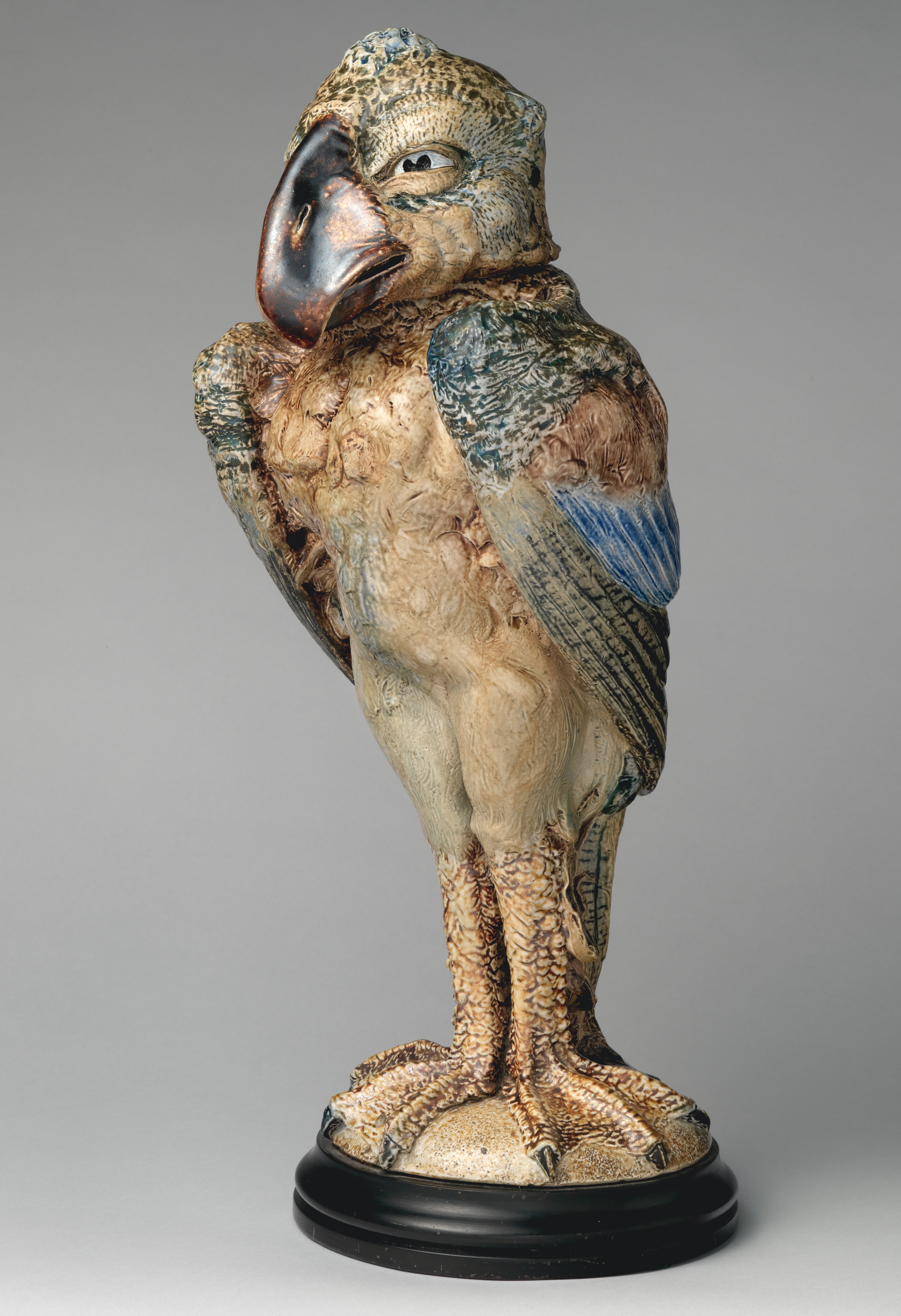
Martin Brothers Wally Bird, 1896.

A Wally Bird is a tobacco jar or vase in the style of a grotesque owl or bird, first termed for the sculptural productions in this form by Robert Wallace Martin. These were typical examples of Martinware — salt-glazed stoneware which was produced by the Martin Brothers in their pottery; first in Fulham and then in Southall.

The Wally Birds were popular but did not make the Martins wealthy; the pottery closed in 1914. Kate Holterhoff considered that they were successful with consumers because of their anthropomorphic features and cited an example in the Metropolitan Museum of Art, "This bird's upright posture, leer, arched eyebrows, and impish smile psychologize its supreme and delightful acuity. As a successful animal caricature this playful creature meets the gaze of its human audience fearlessly, and appears poised to ridicule our foibles as an equal."

Wally Birds were stolen by professional art thieves during a spate of burglaries between 2005 and 2007. It was returned to Ealing council on 2020 and 2021 and were returned to their rightful households.

Examples of these birds now sell at auction for large sums of money.
