= Digswell Arts Trust =

Coordinates: 51.799°N 0.181°W

The Digswell Arts Trust was founded by Henry Morris in 1957 at Welwyn Garden City, Hertfordshire, England. It was founded to promote the use of professional artists to create civic artwork for the benefit of society.

== History ==
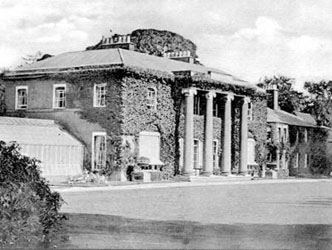
Digswell House c. 1905

When Henry Morris was appointed to the Ministry of Town and Country Planning as a cultural advisor, he obtained backing from the government and the Welwyn Garden City Development Corporation and established the Digswell Arts Trust in 1957. The trust was named after Digswell House, a decayed Regency mansion with cottages and outbuildings on the edge of Welwyn Garden City. The house was renovated by Hans Coper, Stirrat Johnson-Marshall and Bill Allen and leased to the trust to provide accommodation and studios for artists. The trust was formally inaugurated by Countess Mountbatten on 29 May 1959.

The first artists moved in at the end of 1957 and, over the next 27 years, nearly 150 were accommodated there. Some notable members included Michael Andrews, Ralph Brown, John Brunsdon, James Butler, Peter Collingwood, Mary Farmer (textile artist, tapestries and rugs), Hans Coper, Lol Coxhill, Elizabeth Fritsch and John W Mills. Henry Moore, Herbert Read, Roland Penrose, and others have supported the trust financially.

In 1985, the trust was financially unable to continue at Digswell House. The house was sold for refurbishment and divided into a number of separate apartments.

Attimore Hall Barn, a restored 17th century listed building in the Panshanger area of Welwyn Garden City, was leased in 1979 by the trust as additional studio space. The barn became the trust's base from 1984 until April 2006. English Partnerships had by then taken control of the barn, planning to convert it to housing, and worked with the trust to design a new purpose-built studio building on the site of the former forge in Digswell, on which a 25-year lease was taken in April 2006.

In 1993, Stevenage Borough Council leased the Fairlands Valley Farmhouse to the trust, nearly doubling the available studio space. In 2012, with the support of Letchworth Heritage Foundation, the trust opened its third studio premises in Fenners Building, Openshaw Way, Letchworth. This building brings the number of artists supported by the trust to 45 in 2015.
