= Ewen Henderson =

Ewen, Ewan or Euan Henderson may refer to:

- Ewen Henderson (artist), English ceramic artist
- Ewen Henderson (musician), fiddler and bagpiper
- Euan Henderson (snooker player)
- Euan Henderson (footballer) (born 2000), Scottish football forward (Hamilton Academical)
- Ewan Henderson (footballer) (born 2000), Scottish football defender (Wycombe Wanderers)
