= John Brunsdon =

British artist, printmaker and painter

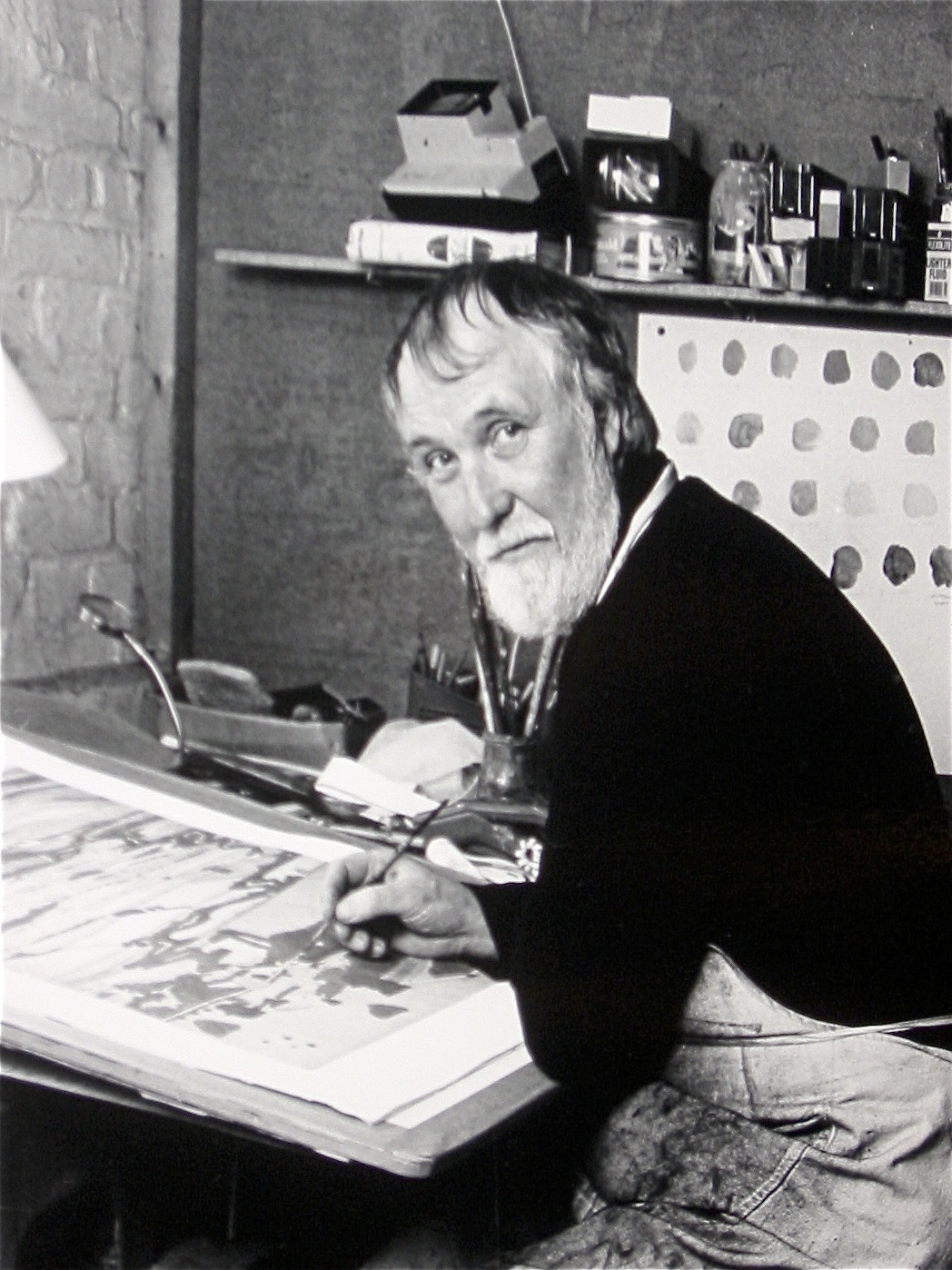
- Born: August 15, 1933 (age 92); Cheltenham, England
- Died: 13 April 2014; Ipswich, England
- Occupations: printmaker Author

John Reginald Brunsdon ARCA was a British artist, printmaker and painter. He was born in Cheltenham 15 August 1933 and died in Ipswich 13 April 2014.

== Work ==
Brunsdon is considered one of the finest British printmakers and is represented in many major public collections such as the Tate Gallery, the Scottish Museum of Modern Art, the V&A, the Arts Council, MOMA in New York and the British Council.

Brunsdon studied at the Cheltenham College of Art from 1949 to 1953. After national service he attended the Royal College of Art from 1955 to 1958 under the tutelage of Julian Trevelyan and others including Edwin La Dell, Edward Ardizzone and Edward Bawden.

Inspired initially by the great American abstract expressionists (and artists such as Yves Klein) Brunsdons' early work in monochrome as well as colour assured his reputation. Showing by invite at the New Editions Exhibition (group show) at the Zwemmer Gallery 1961. By the 1970s Brunsdons' work became more figurative and led by landscape and turned further again to a more representational style in his later life.

From 1958 to 1963 he was resident at Digswell House when he began teaching portrait painting part-time at St. Albans School of Art. He then moved to Woburn, Bedfordshire. In 1969 he established the printmaking department at St Albans College of Art, where he taught full-time for 16 years as Head of Printmaking while exhibiting extensively in Britain and abroad, until moving to Stradbroke in Suffolk in 1977 and then to Cole Street, Wilby in 1983.

Brunsdon was a full member of The Royal Society of Painter-Printmakers and in 1965 a founder member of The Printmakers Council.

== Collections ==
1967 Curwen Gallery, London

His etchings are in national and major collections worldwide including:

- Tate Gallery, London
- Arts Council of Great Britain
- British Council
- Government Art Collection
- Victoria & Albert Museum
- Museum of Modern Art, New York
- National Trust
- University of Warwick

== Selected solo exhibitions ==
1967 Curwen Gallery, London

1968 Printmakers Workshop, Edinburgh

1973 Oxford Gallery, Oxford

1975 Zella 9 Gallery, London

1976 Swansea Arts Festival, Swansea

1984 John Owen Gallery, Cardiff

1984 Chapman Gallery, Canberra

1989 Heffers gallery, Cambridge

1990 Shakespeare Centre, Stratford-upon-Avon

1996 CCA Galleries, London

1998 Major retrospective at the Bankside Gallery, London

2006 Rostra & Rooksmoor Gallery, Bath

== Bibliography ==
The Technique of Etching and Engraving – Batsford 1964.

== Bibliography ==
The Technique of Etching and Engraving – Batsford 1964.
