= Lucie Rie =

Austrian-British studio potter (1902–1995)

Dame Lucie Rie DBE
- Rie in 1990
- Born: Lucie Gomperz; 16 March 1902; Vienna, Austria
- Died: 1 April 1995 (aged 93); London, England
- Education: Kunstgewerbeschule
- Known for: Studio pottery

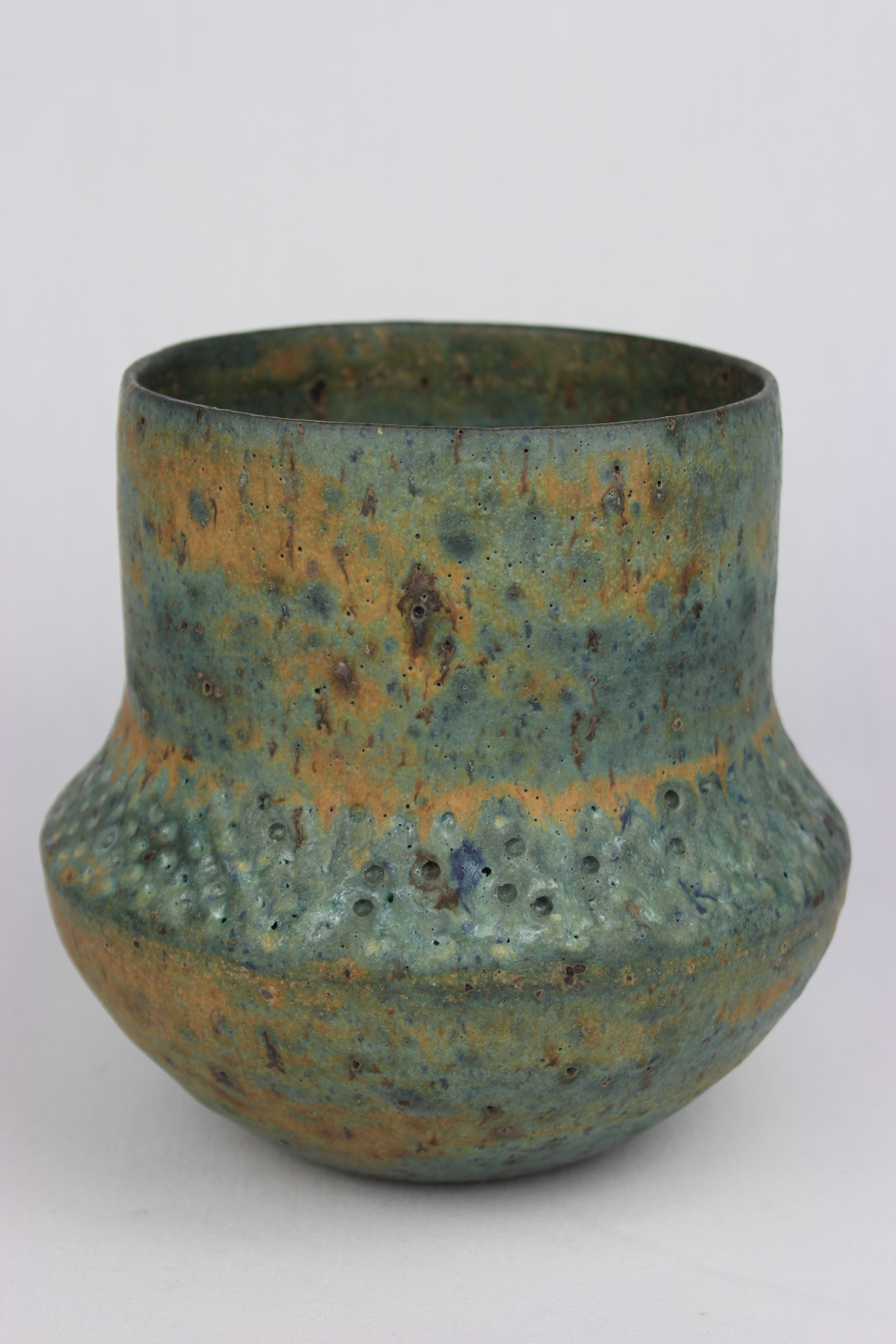
Thrown vase by Lucie Rie

Dame Lucie Rie, DBE (16 March 1902 – 1 April 1995) (German pronunciation: [lʊtsiː ʀiː]) was an Austrian-born, independent, British studio potter. She is known for her extensive technical knowledge, her meticulously detailed experimentation with glazes and with firing and her unusual decorative techniques.

== Biography ==
=== Early years and education ===
Lucie Gomperz was born in Vienna, the youngest child of Gisela and Benjamin Gomperz, a Jewish medical doctor who was a consultant to Sigmund Freud. She had two brothers, Paul Gomperz and Teddy Gomperz. Paul Gomperz was killed at the Italian front in 1917. She had a liberal upbringing.

She studied pottery under Michael Powolny at the Vienna Kunstgewerbeschule, a school of arts and crafts associated with the Wiener Werkstätte, in which she enrolled in 1922.

=== Career in Vienna ===
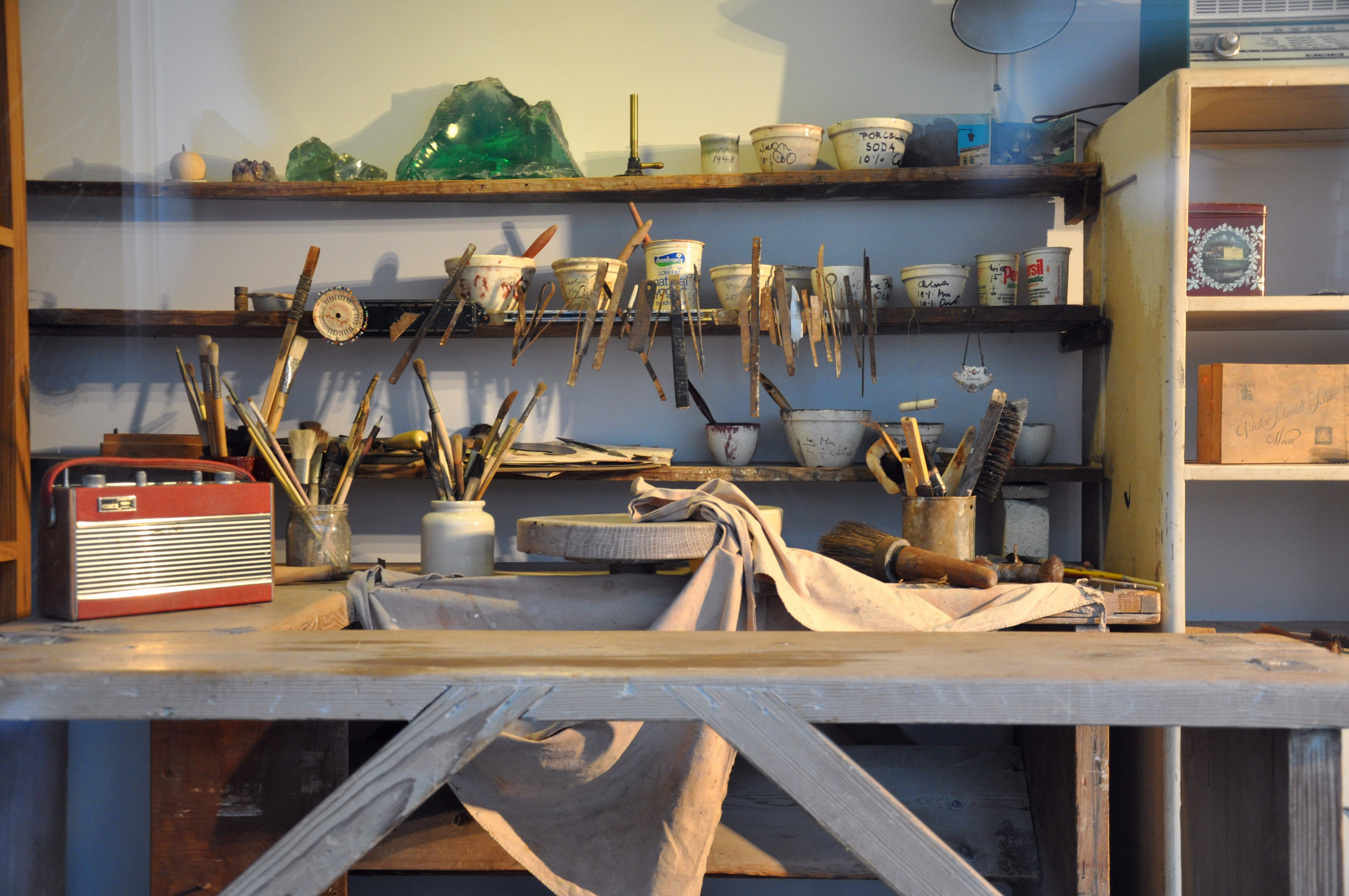
Lucie Rie's workshop, as exhibited in the Victoria and Albert Museum, London

While in Vienna, Lucie's uncle from her mother's side had a collection of art that inspired her interest in archaeology and architecture. She was first inspired by her uncle's Roman pottery collection which had been excavated from the suburbs of Vienna. She set up her first studio in Vienna in 1925 and exhibited the same year at the Paris International Exhibition. She was influenced by Neoclassicism, Jugendstil, modernism, and Japonism.

In 1937, Rie won a silver medal at the Paris International Exhibition (the exhibition for which Pablo Picasso painted Guernica). Rie had her first solo show as a potter in 1949.

=== Career in London ===
In 1938, Rie fled Nazi Austria and emigrated to England, where she settled in a small mews house in London where she lived and had her studio for the rest of her life. Around the time she emigrated, she separated from Hans Rie, a businessman whom she had married in Vienna in 1926, and their marriage was dissolved in 1940. For a time she provided accommodation to another Austrian émigré, the physicist Erwin Schrödinger. During and after the war, to make ends meet, she made ceramic buttons and jewellery for couture fashion outlets. Exactly matching ceramic buttons to the colours of the clothing to which they were to be attached stimulated Rie's experimentation and accuracy with glazes. Some of these buttons are now displayed at London's Victoria and Albert Museum and as part of the Lisa Sainsbury Collection at the Sainsbury Centre for Visual Arts in Norwich.

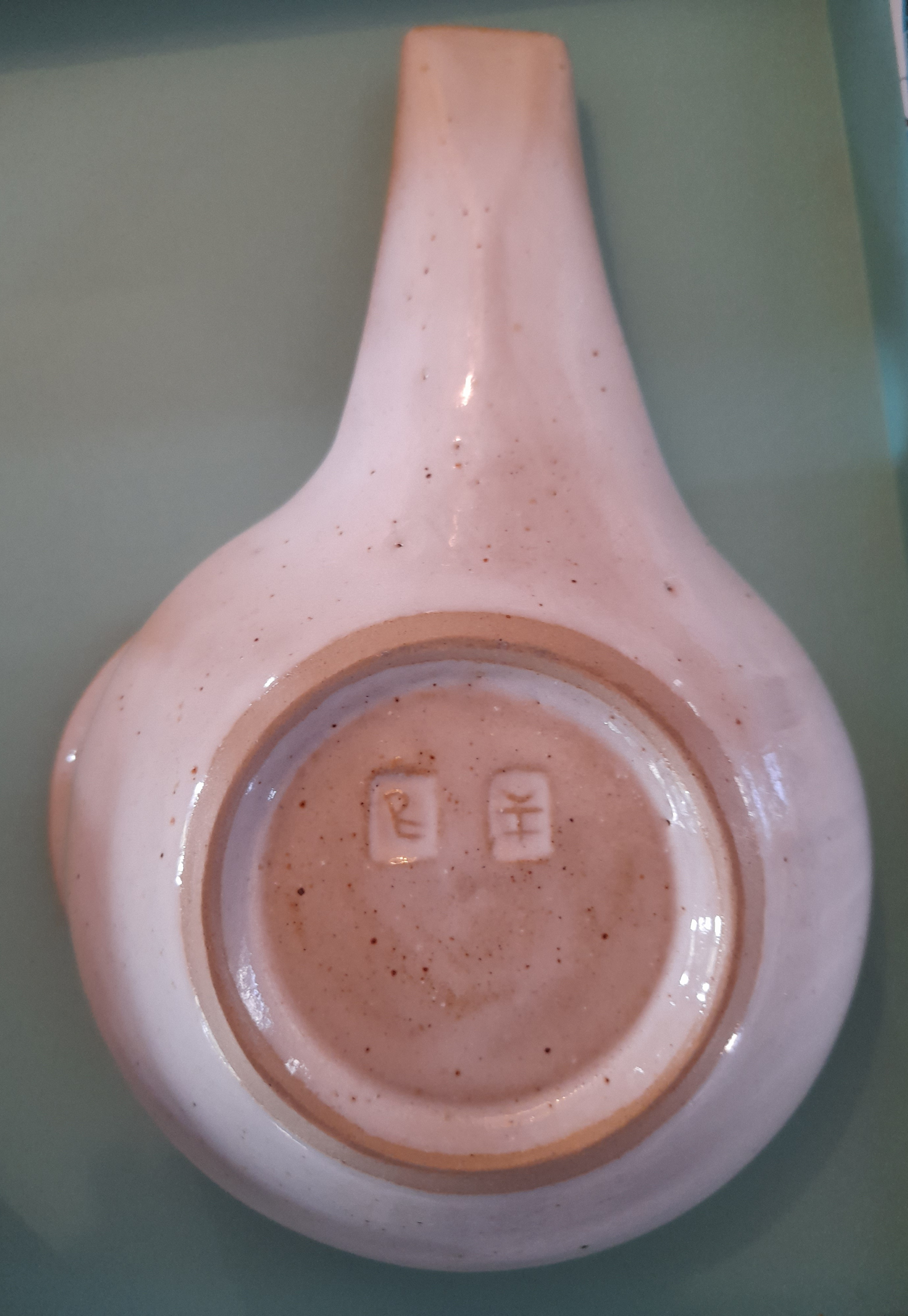
Base of shallow cup or bowl with handle showing Lucie Rie and Hans Coper pottery marks.

In 1946, Rie hired Hans Coper, a fellow emigre, a young man with no experience in ceramics, to help her fire the buttons. Although Coper was interested in learning sculpture, she sent him to a potter named Heber Mathews, who taught him how to make pots on the wheel. Rie and Coper exhibited together in 1948. Coper became a partner in Rie's studio, where he remained until 1958. Their friendship lasted until Coper's death in 1981.

Rie's small studio was at 18 Albion Mews, a narrow street of converted stables near Hyde Park in London. She invited many people to her studio and was renowned for giving her visitors tea and cake. The studio remained almost unchanged during the 50 years she occupied it and has been reconstructed in the Victoria and Albert Museum's ceramics gallery.

Rie was a friend of Bernard Leach, one of the leading figures in British studio pottery in the mid-20th century, and she was impressed by his views, especially concerning the "completeness" of a pot. But despite his transient influence, her brightly coloured, delicate, modernist pottery stands apart from Leach's subdued, rustic, oriental work. She taught at Camberwell College of Arts from 1960 until 1972.

She received several awards for her work and exhibited with great success. Her most famous creations are vases, bottles and bowls, which drew some inspiration from Japan as well as many other places. There are other works such as buttons, which she bequeathed to her close friend the Japanese designer Issey Miyake and bowls including her own egg cup which she gave to the publisher Susan Shaw.

Rie was interviewed in 1982 in her studio by David Attenborough, a great admirer of her work.

=== Death ===
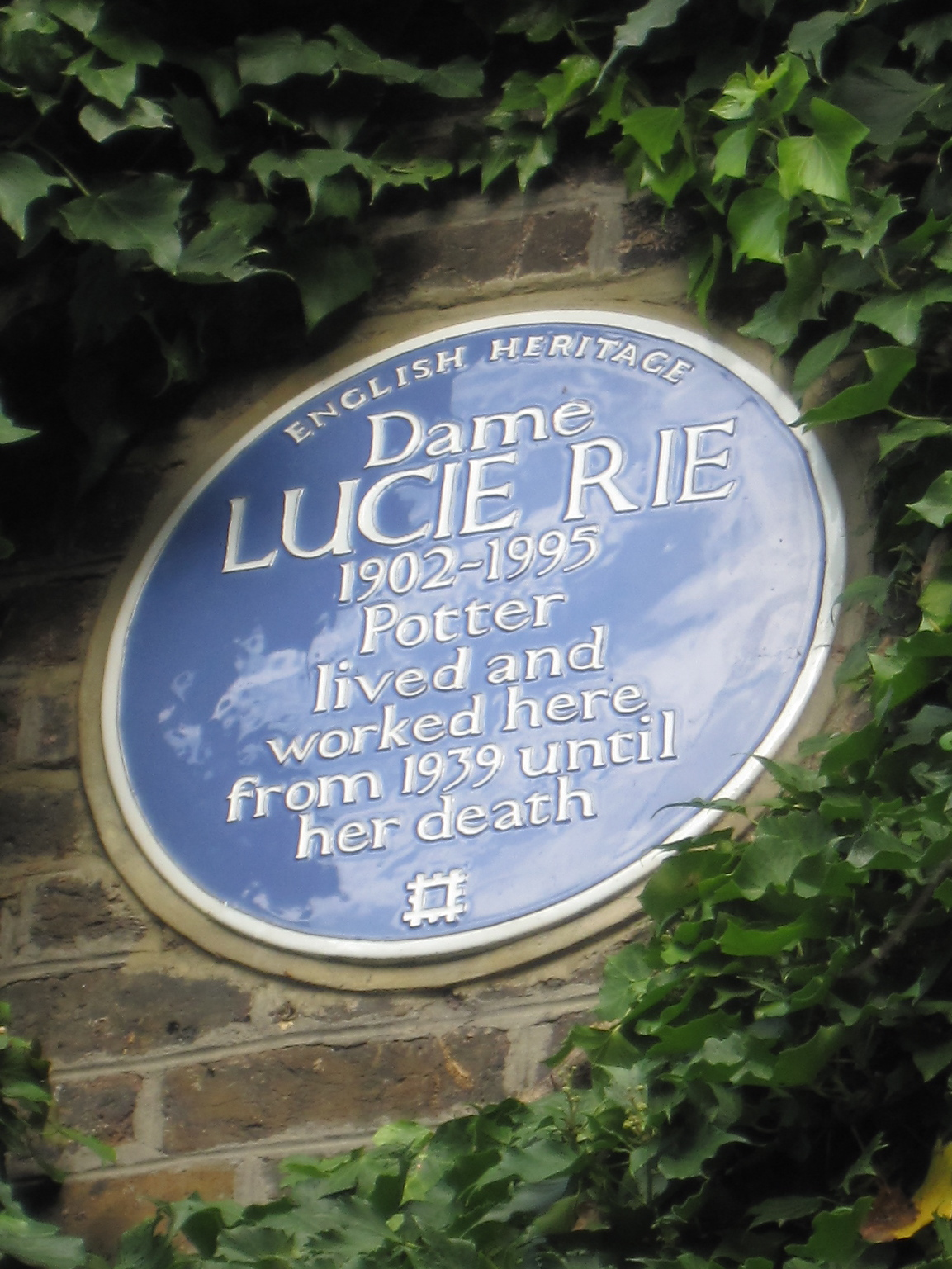
Blue plaque at her former home on 18 Albion Mews, Paddington, London

Rie stopped making pottery in 1990, when she suffered the first of a series of strokes. She died at home in London on 1 April 1995, aged 93.

== Legacy ==
Rie's work has been described as cosmopolitan. She is best remembered for her bowl and bottle forms. Her pottery is displayed in collections around the world, including the Museum of Modern Art in New York, the York Art Gallery in the UK, the Carnegie Museum of Art in Pittsburgh, and Paisley Museum in Scotland. She influenced many during her 60 year career and developed very inventive kiln processing. Her studio was moved and reconstructed in the new ceramics gallery at the Victoria and Albert Museum opened in 2009. She was awarded the title of Dame Commander (DCE) after teaching at the Camberwell School of Art from 1960 until 1971.

In 2023, a major exhibition of Rie's work was held at the Holburne Museum in Bath, over 100 items representing sixty years of her work from early pieces made in Vienna on to a raspberry coloured bowl made when she was 88.

In 2025, a major retrospective of her work was held at the National Crafts Museum in Kanazawa, Japan, examining her life and her ties with East Asian ceramics. At a lecture held in conjunction with the exhibition, it was noted that a 1989 show of her work in Tokyo and Osaka had attracted large numbers of young visitors, thereby opening ceramics exhibitions to a new audience.

== Awards and honours ==
- 1937 Silver medal at the Paris International Exhibition
- 1968 Officer of the Order of the British Empire (OBE)
- 1969 Honorary doctorate from the Royal College of Art
- 1981 Commander of the Order of the British Empire (CBE)
- 1991 Dame Commander of the Order of the British Empire (DBE)
- 1992 Honorary Doctorate from Heriot-Watt University

== Sources ==
- Birks, Tony. Lucie Rie, Stenlake Publishing, 2009. ISBN 978-1-84033-448-7.
- Coatts, Margot (ed.). Lucie Rie and Hans Coper: Potters in Parallel, Herbert Press, 1997. ISBN 0-7136-4697-7.
- Cooper, Emmanuel (ed.). Lucie Rie: The Life and Work of Lucie Rie, 1902–1995, Ceramic Review Publishing Ltd., 2002. ISBN 4-86020-122-1.
- Frankel, Cyril. Modern Pots: Hans Coper, Lucie Rie & their Contemporaries, University of East Anglia Press, 2002. ISBN 0-946009-36-8.
- "Dame Lucie Rie, 93, Noted Ceramicist", New York Times, April 3, 1995, B10.
