= Carol McNicoll =

English studio potter (1943–2025)

Carol Margaret McNicoll (24 December 1943 – 3 March 2025) was an English studio potter whose work was mainly decorative slipcast ware, she is credited with helping to transform the British ceramics scene in the late 1970s.

== Biography ==
McNicoll was born in Birmingham on 24 December 1943, and brought up in Solihull, Warwickshire (now West Midlands). She attended a foundation course at Solihull College of Technology and then studied fine art at Leeds Polytechnic from 1967 to 1970. In 1968 she made a film with three other students titled Musical which collaged and parodied existing musicals; the comedian Roy Hudd was invited to open the premiere. McNicoll was awarded a Princess of Wales Scholarship to attend Royal College of Art from 1970 to 1973, where she felt women were "marginalised" and "attention went to the men who were interested in industrial ceramics".

McNicoll worked as a wardrobe assistant at theatres in Birmingham and London in the early 1960s. In 1970 she designed costumes for Brian Eno of Roxy Music who was then her boyfriend. Her black cockerel feathered boa collar achieved an iconic status in the fledgling glamrock period. McNicoll supervised the design of the cover for Eno's Here Come the Warm Jets album with one of her teapot designs being featured on the sleeve cover. She also worked as a machinist for the fashion designer Zandra Rhodes, who in 1972 commissioned her to make a unique dinner set, consisting of pink coffee cups with hands for saucers.

McNicoll made sculptural functional ceramics and lectured widely including at Camberwell College of Arts from 1986 to 2000. In 2001 she was short-listed for the Jerwood Prize for Ceramics. Later work was constructed from slipcast and found objects such as toy soldiers, using commercial and self made transfer decoration.

McNicoll said of her work "I am entertained by making functional objects which are both richly patterned and comment on the strange world we have created for ourselves." She exhibited internationally and in 2003 City Gallery at Leicester, England presented a major retrospective of her work. Her work is in the V&A's modern collection.

McNicoll lived and worked in a converted piano factory in Kentish Town in London, designed by her friend the architect Piers Gough in exchange for a McNicoll tea set. She died on 3 March 2025, at the age of 81.

== Exhibitions ==
Selected later exhibitions included:

- Well meaning cultural commodities, Barrett Marsden Gallery London 2008
- Taiwan biennale exhibition curated by Moyra Elliott, 2010
- Ceramics – Carol McNicoll, Ken Eastman, Alison Britton, Clara Scremini Gallery, Paris, 2010
- Ideal Home – Carol McNicoll, Jacqui Poncelet, Sam Scott, Marsden Woo Gallery London, 2011
- 5 Divas: Carol McNicoll, Jacqui Poncelet, Janice Tchalenko, Elizabeth Fritsch, Alison Britton, Helene Aziza Paris, 2012
- Pieces together: Carol McNicoll, Sam Scott, 1 Canada Square, Canary Wharf London, 2012
