= Hans Coper =

British studio potter (1920–1981)

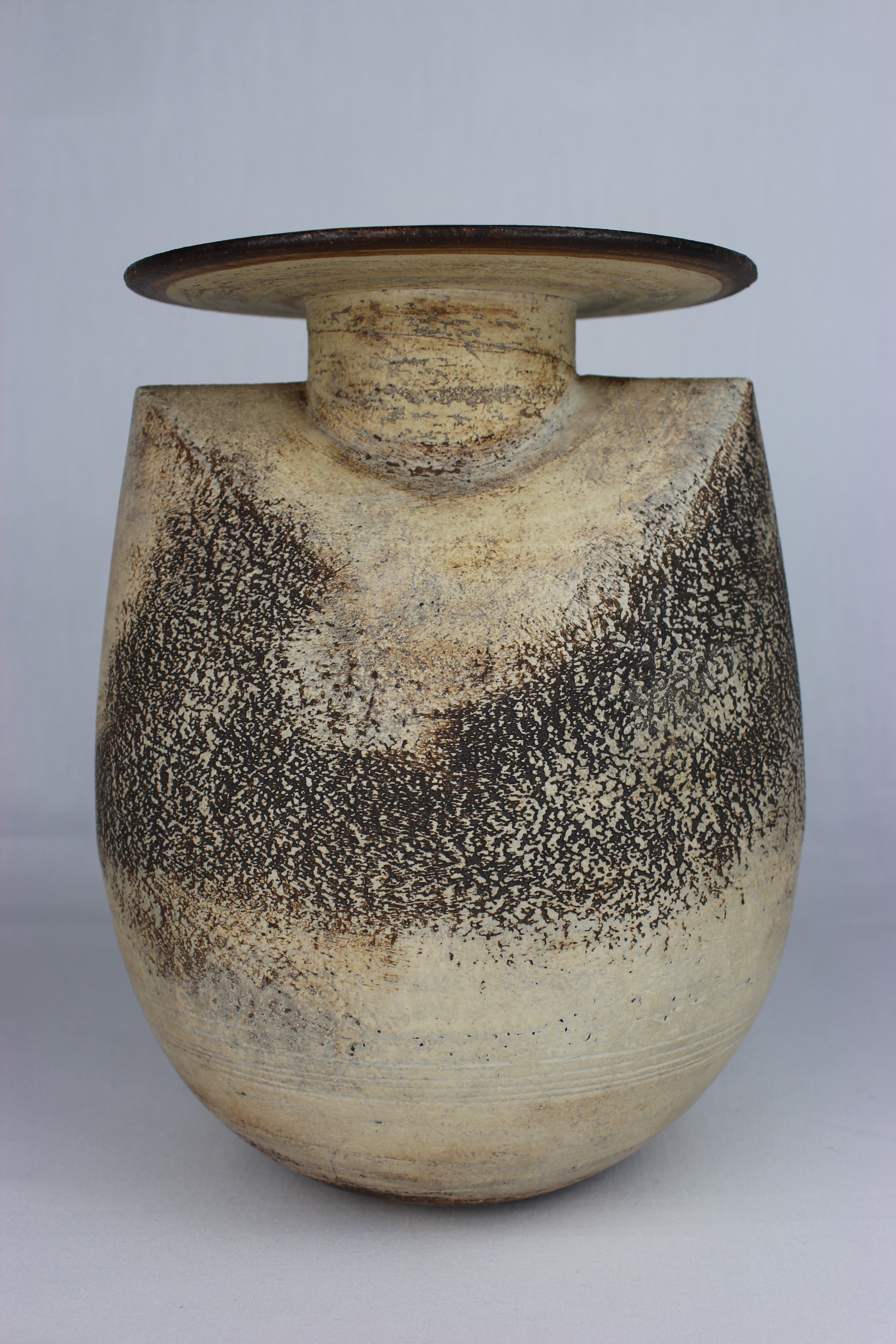
Thrown Bottle by Hans Coper

Hans Coper (8 April 1920 – 16 June 1981) was an influential German-born British studio potter. His work is often coupled with that of Lucie Rie due to their close association, even though their best known work differs dramatically, with Rie's being less sculptural, while Coper's was much more abstract, but also always functional. Coper always made functional vessels, principally containers for flowers (vases), fruit (bowls), or candles (candle holders), including work for Coventry Cathedral and Sussex University meeting house. He made a small group of Figures in the fifties, which were not vessels and were never put on sale.

== Biography ==
Coper was born in Chemnitz, Germany, and fled to the UK in 1939. He was interned as an enemy alien, and held in Canada for two years; on return to Britain in 1942, he served as a conscientious objector in the Non-Combatant Corps.

In 1946, with no previous experience in ceramics, he began working as an assistant in the studio of Lucie Rie. Rie and Coper made tea sets and cups and saucers together. By the time he left in 1958 to establish his own studio at Digswell House in Hertfordshire, he was already well known as a potter in his own right, experimenting with much more abstract forms that were at the time considered very ahead of their time. Because of the success of his work, he went on to become a leading figure in the 20th century studio pottery movement. Throughout the 1960s he taught pottery at the Camberwell School of Art and the Royal College of Art. He died in Frome, Somerset in 1981 of amyotrophic lateral sclerosis.

Coper would characteristically throw his work on the potter's wheel, then alter and assemble pieces by hand to achieve the finished form. Thus, although made on the wheel, his work has a sculptural quality, but is always functional. The surfaces of his pots tend to be roughly textured and coloured with oxides, especially manganese oxide. His distinctive pots take on recognizable "forms" he termed Spade, Bud, Cup, Egg, Flower and Arrow.

Coper's work was widely exhibited and collected even in his lifetime. Today, it is found in the collections of major museums around the world, including the Metropolitan Museum of Art, the Victoria and Albert Museum, Museum de Fundatie, the Sainsbury Centre in Norwich UK, and York Art Gallery, as well as in private collections worldwide. Among his best known works is the set of six seven-foot candlesticks on the high altar at Coventry Cathedral, commissioned in 1962.

== Bibliography ==
1. Birks, Tony. Hans Coper, Marston House Publishers, 1998. ISBN 0-9517700-0-4
2. Coatts, Morgot (ed.). Lucie Rie and Hans Coper: Potters in Parallel, Herbert Press, 1997. ISBN 0-7136-4697-7.
3. Frankel, Cyril. Modern Pots: Hans Coper, Lucie Rie & their Contemporaries, University of East Anglia Press, 2002. ISBN 0-946009-36-8.
