= Ewen Henderson (artist) =

English ceramic artist (1934–2000)

James Ewen Henderson
- Born: 3 January 1934. Staffordshire, England
- Died: 6 October 2000 (aged 66)
- Occupation: Artist

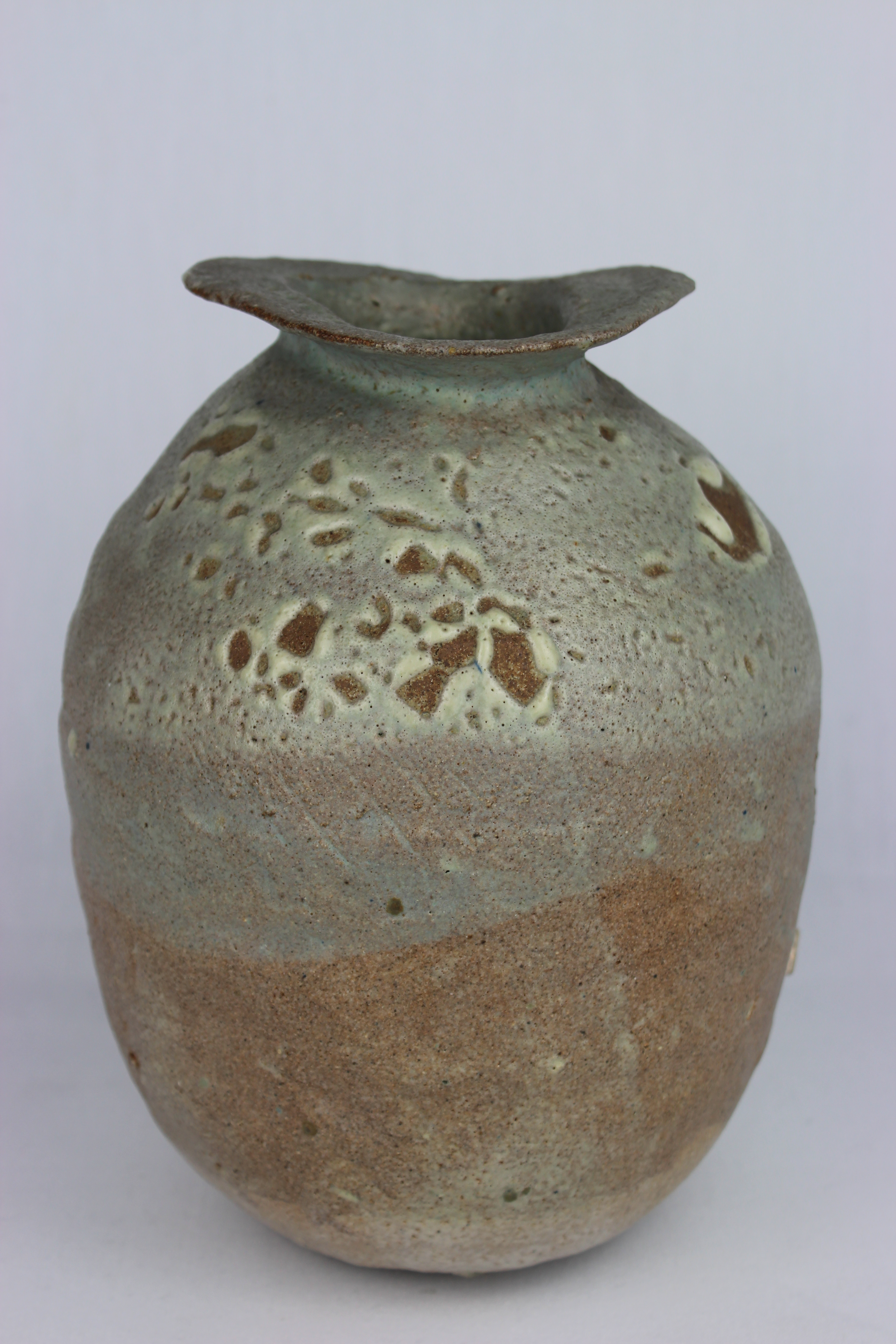
pinched, coiled pot by Ewen Henderson

James Ewen Henderson (3 January 1934 – 6 October 2000) was an English ceramic artist.

Born at Cheddleton Hospital in Staffordshire, he was the second son and younger child of David Henderson (c.1900–1953), doctor of medicine, and (Beatrice) Mary Stewart (c.1905–1956), teacher and administrator, both of whom were Scottish. He was brought up, unconventionally and rather unhappily, in a large mental hospital near Leek, where his father was resident GP. He joined his brother, David, at Adams' Grammar School, Newport, Shropshire, which he attended from 1947 to 1952, excelling in cricket and rugby. He served his national service in the RAF regiment in Germany.

After studying at Goldsmiths College and Camberwell School of Art he spent time at Edinburgh College of Art before returning to London to build his reputation.

In May 2000 Henderson was awarded an honorary fellowship of the London Institute, in recognition of his contribution to art and of his 30 years' distinguished teaching at Camberwell College of Arts, having joined the staff in 1970 when the school was still called Camberwell School of Arts and Crafts. His students included such notable studio potters as Jim Malone, Angus Suttie, and Sara Radstone. "Ewen Henderson was one of the most important and influential ceramic artists of the late twentieth century.

He preferred irregular, hand-built forms, and developed a technique in which a patchwork of different types of clay was used."

In 2002 a newly constructed hall of residence housing 260 students was named Ewen Henderson Court in his memory and honour. It is located in New Cross Gate, London.
