= California pottery =

Pottery industry in state of California

California pottery includes industrial, commercial, and decorative pottery produced in the Northern California and Southern California regions of the U.S. state of California. Production includes brick, sewer pipe, architectural terra cotta, tile, garden ware, tableware, kitchenware, art ware, figurines, giftware, and ceramics for industrial use. Ceramics include terra cotta, earthenware, porcelain, and stoneware products.

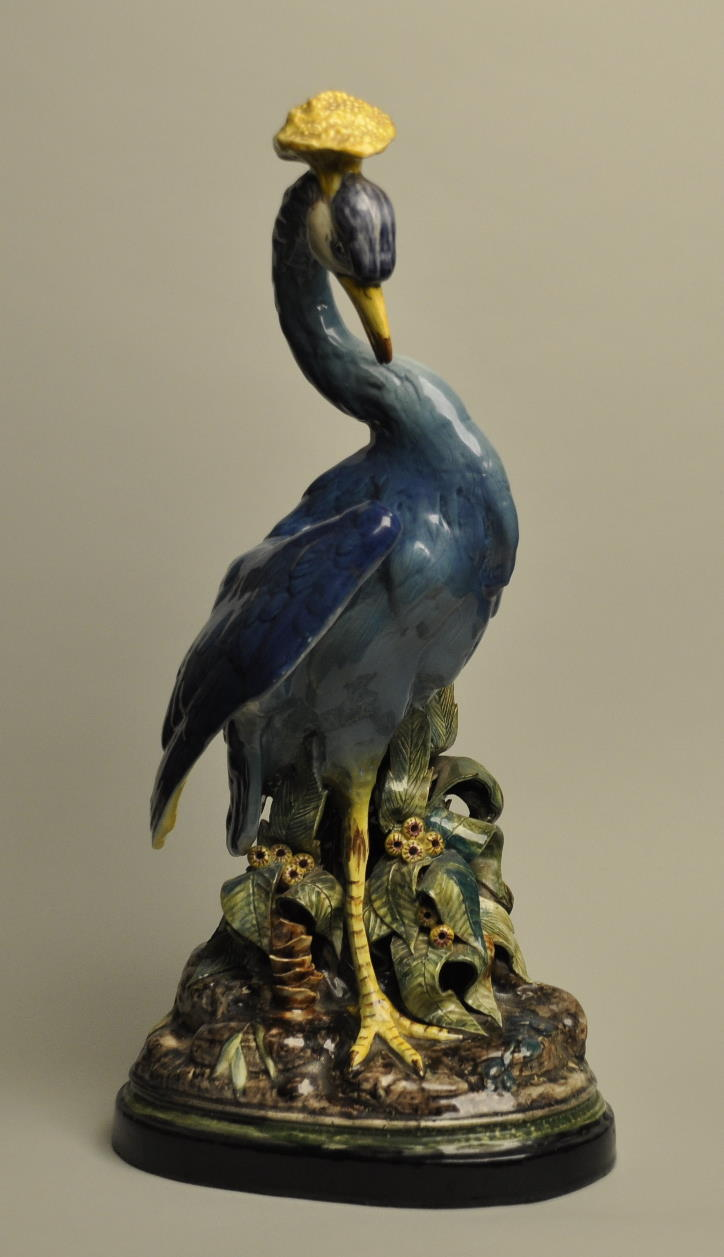
Ceramic Originals by Freeman-Leidy, crane figurine.

Key milestones in the history of California pottery include: the arrival of Spanish settlers, the advent of statehood and subsequent population growth, the Arts and Crafts movement, Great Depression, World War II era and the post-WWII onslaught of low-priced imports leading to a steep decline in the number of California potteries. California potters large and small have left a legacy of tableware design, collectibles, art, and architecture.

== History ==
Tile has been a favorite building material in California since the early Spanish settled the area and brought with them the tradition of using brightly colored tiles in architecture. Helen Stiles, author of numerous books on the history of pottery, noted that Spanish, Mexican, and Chinese design of the 17th and 18th centuries all influenced the decoration of tile and other pottery in California.

As people moved into California after statehood in 1848, the demand for ceramic products grew exponentially. Buildings needed roofs, floors, and sewer pipes. The ceramic industry grew as the demand increased. The "Golden Era in tile making" and art pottery, influenced by the Arts and Crafts movement, was around 1910. Architect Julia Morgan used tiles to adorn her buildings, including the Hearst Castle in the 1920s.

The most active period for the production of household ceramics including tableware, kitchenware, giftware, and art ware was from the 1930s through the 1960s. The major area of U.S. household ceramics production was in the Los Angeles Basin. Around Los Angeles there were over 300 producers of figurines. Next in size was the Trenton area, followed by East Liverpool, and a few in the middle west, such as Ceramic Arts Studio, Red Wing Pottery and Haeger Potteries.

The period around World War II saw the greatest growth for the U.S. ceramic industry. With imports cut off from European and Asian markets, small family-owned and larger potteries stepped in to fill the need for ceramic giftware and tableware throughout the United States. By 1948, "the peak year for the industry, over eight hundred ceramic concerns were in operation throughout California." With sunlight year round, an abundance of raw materials, and relatively inexpensive natural gas, California became competitive with centers of ceramic production such as the "Pottery Capital of the World" East Liverpool, Ohio, and Stoke-on-Trent, Staffordshire, England.

In the 1950s, favorable trade agreements toward Asian countries contributed to a flood of competitively priced ceramic wares entering the United States market. Only a fraction of California potteries survived this competition through the early 1960s. As of 2023, only a few are still in business.

=== "Big Five" California potteries ===
The "Big Five" California potteries, from the 1930s to the 1960s in reference to the range of products and output, were Vernon Kilns, J.A. Bauer Pottery, Metlox Potteries, Pacific Clay Products, and Gladding, McBean & Co. All of the "Big Five" potteries operated production facilities in the Los Angeles Basin. Gladding, McBean & Co. grew from one factory manufacturing sewer pipe and architectural terra cotta in Lincoln, California, to factories throughout California and the Pacific Northwest. Vernon Kilns closed in 1958, J.A. Bauer in 1962, and Metlox in 1988. The former Gladding, McBean & Co.'s Franciscan tableware and tile factory in Los Angeles was bought by Wedgwood from the Interpace corporation in 1979. Wedgwood closed the Franciscan Ceramics plant in 1984, moving production of the Franciscan tableware brands to England. The former Gladding, McBean & Co.'s Lincoln factory was purchased by Pacific Coast Building Products in 1976 and continues to produce sewer pipe, architectural terra cotta, and terra cotta garden ware. Pacific Clay Products discontinued manufacturing tableware, art ware, and figurines in 1942. Pacific Clay Products continues to manufacture sewer pipe.

=== Big Five potteries table ===
To use the sortable tables: click on the icons at the top of each column to sort that column in alphabetical order; click again for reverse alphabetical order.

Pottery	Location(s)	Dates	Tradename(s) / Products
J.A. Bauer Pottery	Los Angeles	1909–1962	Flower pots, crocks, jugs, tableware, garden ware, & art ware
Gladding, McBean & Co., Lincoln plant (Interpace after 1962 and Pacific Coast Building Products after 1976))	Lincoln	1875–present	Sewer pipe, roof tiles, architectural terra cotta, paver tiles & garden ware
Gladding, McBean & Co., Glendale plant (Interpace after 1962, and Franciscan Ceramics, Inc. after 1979)	Los Angeles	1923–1984	"Franciscan" "Catalina Pottery" tableware, kitchenware, art ware & "Hermosa" tile
Metlox Manufacturing Company	Manhattan Beach	1927–1988	Tableware, giftware, kitchenware, cookie jars, figurines & art ware
Pacific Clay Products	Los Angeles	1916–present	Sewer pipe. From 1932 to 1942: "Pacific Pottery" tableware, kitchenware, art ware & figurines. From 1943–present: brick & pavers
Vernon Kilns	Vernon	1931–1958	Tableware, art ware, & figurines

== Potteries of California ==
=== Northern California ===
Geographically, see Northern California.

To use the sortable tables: click on the icons at the top of each column to sort that column in alphabetical order; click again for reverse alphabetical order.

Pottery	Location(s)	Dates	Tradename(s) / Products
Arequipa Pottery	Fairfax	1911–1918	Art pottery
Billie Vier	Berkeley	1940s	Figurines
California Art Tile Company (Cal Art)	Richmond	1923–1964	Tile
California Faience (The Tile Shop before 1924)	Berkeley	1915–1959	Art pottery & tile
California Pottery Company	Oakland, Niles, Merced	1873–1929	Pipe, roof tile, utilitarian pottery, crockery, & garden ware
California Ra-Art	Richmond	1930s	Art ware & figurines
Camp Del Mar Pottery	Capitola	late 1940s-early 1950s	"Campo" tableware & art ware
Carnegie Brick and Pottery Company Pottery plant	Tesla, California	1903-1911	Figurines, art pottery, vases, urns, clay pipes
Chase Originals (Adele Chase)	Berkeley	1930s-1950s	Art ware & figurines
Environmental Ceramics, Inc.	San Francisco	1960s	Kitchenware
Evans Ceramics Inc.	Healdsburg	1974-	Art ware & cookware
Garden City Pottery Company	San Jose	1902–1979	Crockery, tableware, art ware, garden ware & kitchenware
Gladding Ceramic Insulator Company, Inc.	San Jose	1924-	Tile. "Gladco" insulators after 1964
Heath Ceramics	Sausalito	1948–present	Tableware & art ware
Handcraft Tile (San Jose Tile before 1931)	Topanga	1926–present	Tile
Hans Sumpf Company	Madera	1939–2006	Garden ware & architectural wall surfaces
Homer Knowles Pottery Company	Santa Clara	1923–1937	"K.T.K" "K.T. and K." Art ware, restaurant ware, figurines & novelty giftware
Jade Snow Wong	San Francisco	1950s-1960s	Art ware
Jam Ceramic Design	Sacramento	1975-mid-1980s	Artware, tableware, figurines & giftware
Jane Fauntz	Berkeley	1940s	Figurines
Jessie Grimes	San Francisco Bay area	1940s	Figurines
Kay the Potter (Kay Kinney)	Berkeley	1930s	Figurines & art ware
Lagunita	Oakland	1940s	Figurines
Laurel Pottery and Manufacturing Company	Stockton	1938–1962	Flower pots, art ware & tableware
Monterey Pottery	Carmel Valley	1948-unknown	"Monterey Jade" art ware, figurines & giftware
Mudflat Pottery	Alviso	1974-unknown	Cookie Jars, giftware, tableware & utilitarian ware
Muresque Tiles	Oakland	1925–1935	Tile
Panama Pottery	Sacramento	1914–present	Utility ware, flower pots, garden ware & art ware
Pond Farm Pottery	Guerneville	1953–1980	Art pottery
Ransgil Glass Co.	Oakland	1940s-50s	Gold-encrusted china and glassware
Red Doat	Berkeley	1930s	Figurines
Redlands Pottery	Redlands	1902–1909	Art ware
Richenda Stevick	Redwood City, then Berkeley	1930s	Figurines & art ware
Roblin Art Pottery	San Francisco	1898–1906	Art pottery
San Carlos Pottery	San Carlos	late 1930s-late 1940s	Artware & figurines
San Jose Tile (Handcraft Tile after 1931)	San Jose, California	1926–1931	Tile
Sierra Vista Ceramics	Sierra Vista	1942–1951	Giftware, cookie jars & kitchenware
Solon and Schemmel Tile Company (S&S)	San Jose	1920–1936	Tile
Sorcha Boru	San Carlos	1936–1950	Art ware, giftware & figurines
Stockton Terra Cotta Company (Stockton Art Pottery after 1896)	Stockton	1890–1895	Firebrick, sewer pipe & stove pipe & art pottery
Stockton Art Pottery (Stockton Brick and Pottery Company after 1901)	Stockton	1896–1900	Sewer pipe, brick & art pottery
Stockton Brick and Pottery Company	Stockton	1901-1902	Sewer pipe & brick
Stonelite	San Jose	unknown	Tile
Strictly Stoneware	Capitola	unknown	Tableware
Technical Porcelain and Chinaware Company (TEPCO)	El Cerrito	1922–1968	
Walrich Pottery	Berkeley	1922–1930	Art pottery, figurines & tile
Washburn	Berkeley	1930s-1940s	Art ware
West Coast Porcelain Manufacturers	Millbrae	1920s	Sanitary ware & "California Porcelain" art ware
Woolenius Tile Company	Berkeley	1927–1941	Tile

=== Southern California ===
Geographically, see Southern California.

To use the sortable tables: click on the icons at the top of each column to sort that column in alphabetical order; click again for reverse alphabetical order.

Pottery	Location(s)	Dates	Tradename(s) / Products
Acme Tile Company	Los Angeles	1925–1932	Tile
Adelle	Laguna Beach	1940s	Art ware
Affiliated Craftsmen's Studio	Los Angeles	unknown	Planters
Alhamhra Kilns, Inc.	Alhambra	1920s-	Floor and roof tile
Alberhill Coal and Clay Company	Alberhill (Riverside County)	1882–1920	Art pottery from 1910 to 1912
Alexander Franzka	La Crescenta-Montrose	1965-1987	Figurines, art ware, gift ware, terra cotta
Alhambra Kilns, Inc.	Santa Monica	1926–1937	Tile & roof tile
American Ceramic Products	Los Angeles, Santa Monica	1939–1967	"La Mirada" "Winfield" tableware, art ware, & figurines
American China Company	Los Angeles	1920s	Tile
American Encaustic Tiling Company (Gladding, McBean & Co. after 1933)	Vernon, Hermosa Beach	1919–1933	Tile
American Pottery	Los Angeles, San Juan Capistrano	1943–1953	"Brad Keeler Art Ware" "American Pottery" giftware, art ware, & figurines
American Refractories Company	Los Angeles	unknown	Fire brick
Angulo Tile Company	Santa Barbara & Reseda	unknown	Floor & roof tile
Ann Crochran	North Hollywood	early to mid-1950s	Art ware
Arcadia Ceramics	Arcadia	1940s-1950s	Novelty giftware
Architectural Pottery	Los Angeles	1950–1962	Planters, ash trays
Artistic Potteries Company	Whittier	1940s	Art ware, giftware & figurines
Atlas Fire Brick Company	Los Angeles	unknown	Fire brick
B.J. Brock (Southern California Pottery Company)	Lawndale	1947-80	"Brock" "Brock Ware" "Grantcrest" tableware
Ball Brothers	Inglewood	1943–1948	Art ware & figurines
Barbara Willis	North Hollywood	1942–1958	Art ware & figurines
Batchelder	Pasadena	1910–1932	Tile & architectural products
Batchelder-Wilson Company	Los Angeles	mid-1920s	Tile & architectural products
Bauer Pottery Company of Los Angeles	Los Angeles	2000–present	"Bauer 2000" Tableware, art ware & kitchenware
Belmar of California	Los Angeles	1965–1967	Art ware
Bell Manufacturing and Sales Co.	Los Angeles	1950s	Figurines & art ware
The Bennetts	North Hollywood	1940s-1950s	Art ware
Bergstrom and French	Glendale, California (Scottsdale, Arizona after 1954)	1946–1953	"Solana Ware" Ovenware
Bernard Studios	Los Angeles	1940s	Figurines
Beth Barton	Fullerton	1940s-1950s	Figurines
Betty Lou Nichols	La Habra	1949–1962	Giftware & figurines
Bevan Kilns	Pasadena, Sierra Madre after 1943	1940s	Figurines & giftware
Bill Meyer	Los Angeles	1950s	Figurines & art ware
Bishop of California	unknown	1940s	Planters, giftware
Block Pottery	Los Angeles	1940s	Figurines, art ware & giftware
Bradster Potteries	Los Angeles	1941–1943	Tableware, art ware & figurines
Brayton Laguna Pottery	Laguna Beach	1927–1968	Tableware, art ware & figurines
Brusche Ceramics/Brusche Ceramics of California (J.A. Bauer Pottery after 1950)	Whittier	1949	Tableware
Burke-Simmons	unknown	late 1930s-1940s	Figurines
Burke-Winton	unknown	1930s	Figurines
California Art Products	unknown	1940s	Giftware
California Art Tile Company (Cal Art)	Richmond	1923–1964	Tile
California Brick and Tile Company (formerly Owens Brick Company	Van Nuys	unknown	Brick
California Belleek	Los Angeles	1948–1967	Figurines, giftware, tableware & art ware
California Ceramics (Ceramic Manufacturing Company)	Calabasas	1940s-1950s	"Orchard Ware" tableware
California China Products Company (CCPCo)	National City	1911–1917	"Kaospar" tile
California Clay Products (Calco)	South Gate	1923–1932	Tile
The California Cleminsons	El Monte	1941–1963	Giftware & figurines
California Dresden	Glendale	1951–1954	Figurines & art ware
California Figurine Company (Weil of California after 1946)	Los Angeles	1941–1946	"Weil Ware" giftware, artware, tableware & figurines
California Originals	Torrance	1955–1982	Kitchenware, giftware
California Pottery and Tile Works	Los Angeles	1994–present	Tile
Calpotter	Laguna Beach	1940s	Art ware
Capistrano Ceramics/John R. Stewart Inc.	San Juan Capistrano	1948–1951	Art ware & figurines
Carlana China	Los Angeles	1940s	Figurines
Catalina Clay Products	Avalon, Catalina Island	1927–1937	Tableware, art ware, tile, giftware & figurines
Casa Verdugo Pottery	Montrose	1940s	Giftware
Cemar Clay Products	Los Angeles	1935–1955	Giftware, kitchenware, art ware & figurines
Ceramicraft	San Clemente	1950s	Art ware
Ceramic Originals by Freeman-Leidy	Laguna Beach	1944–1955	Figurines, giftware, & tile
Chalice of California	Los Angeles	1945-early 1950s	Tableware, art ware & figurines
Classic Terra Cotta Company	Long Beach	2003–present	Terra cotta floor tile
Clay Sketches	Pasadena	1940-50s	Figurines
Clay Works, Inc.	Canoga Park	1973-	Planters
Claycraft Potteries	Los Angeles	1921–1939	Tile
The Claysmiths	San Gabriel	1945–1956	"Will-George" art ware & figurines
Claire Lerner	Los Angeles	1946-1950s	Art ware & figurines
Cole-Merris	San Gabriel	early 1940s	Art ware & figurines
Covina Pottery	Covina	1943-1990s	Planters & art ware
Crest China Company (Royal Crest China after 1952)	Santa Ana	1949-mid-1950s	Art ware & giftware
Crowell	Hemet	1940s	Figurines
D. & M. Tile Company	Los Angeles	1928–1939	Tile
Dan Daniels	unknown	1930s	Figurines
De Forest of California	Duarte	1950–1970	Cookie jars & novelty giftware
deLee Art Company	Los Angeles	1937-1950s	Figurines
DeCora Ceramics, Inc.	Inglewood	1952–1954	Art pottery, wall plates & dinnerware
Decorative Arts, Inc.	Hawthorne	1927–1933	"Dec-Art" tile
Denwar Ceramics	Costa Mesa	1940s-1950s	Dinnerware
Desert Sands	Barstow	1960s-70s	Art ware
Designcraft, Inc.	Los Angeles	1963-	Tile, kitchenware and art ware
Dick Knox Pottery	Laguna Beach	1942–1950	"Knox China" tableware & art ware
Donna Winston	unknown	1950s	Art ware, giftware & mugs
Doranne of California	Los Angeles	1950s-1980s	Cookie jars, kitchenware, giftware, & planters
Douglass Clay Products Company (Pacific Sewer Pipe after 1910)	Los Angeles	1903–1910	Sewer pipe
Dorothy Kindell	Laguna Beach	1940s-1950s	Giftware & figurines
Drummond Pottery	Capistrano Beach	1950s	Figurines
Dubby of Hollywood	Hollywood	1940s	Figurines
Earthgender	El Segundo	1970s	Art ware & planters
Edmond Ronaky	Laguna Beach	1950s	Art ware & giftware
Elzac	Los Angeles, after 1944 Hawthorne	1941–1947	Figurines
Emesco Refractories Company	Los Angeles	1927-unknown	Fire brick
Empire China Company	Burbank	1920s-	Restaurant ware & tableware
The Enchanto Co.	Burbank	1950s	Tableware
Esther Shirey	Encino	1930s	Figurines
Eugene White	Bell Gardens	1941–1948	Tableware & art ware
Ever Art Ceramics	Los Angeles	1940s	Art ware
The Feldman Company	Los Angeles	unknown	Lamps
FHR Fred Robertson Los Angeles Pottery	Los Angeles	1906–1921	Art ware
Fleurette Ceramics, Inc.	West Hollywood	1950s	Giftware
Flintridge China Company (Gorham after 1970)	Pasadena	1945–1970	Tableware
Florence Ceramics	Pasadena	1942–1977	Giftware & figurines
Frazier, Inc.	North Hollywood	1960s	Kitchenware
Fred Wind Ceramics	Glendale	1950–1960	"Windware" art ware
Freeman Lederman	Van Nuys	unknown	Kitchenware & tableware
Freeman McFarlin	El Monte & San Marcos	1951–1980	Art ware & figurines
G.T. Chemical Products, Inc.	San Diego	1977-1980s	"Clay in Mind" planters, cookware, & giftware
Gainey Ceramics Inc.	La Verne	1949–2013	Planters & tile
Gene Lodi	unknown	1950s	Art ware
Genevieve and Charles Tulley	Glendale	1947-unknown	Lamps, art ware & figurines
Gilner	Culver City	1948–1957	Art ware
Globe Tile and Porcelain Works	Los Angeles	unknown	Tile
Golden State Ceramics	Pasadena	1940s	Artware & giftware
Grand Feu Art Pottery (Brauckman Art Pottery)	Los Angeles	mid-1900s	"Grand Feu" and "Brauckman" art ware
Grant Beach	Los Angeles	1940s	Art ware
Grayson Arts	Pasadena	1949-unknown	Giftware & art ware
Green Tree Studio (Bess Wilson)	North Hollywood	1940s	Gifware
Group Artec	Los Angeles	unknown	Tile & planters
Guppy	Corona del Mar	1940s-1950s	“Island Ware” tableware
H.F. Coors	Inglewood	1925–2003	Institutional china
H & H Tile Company	Los Angeles	1927-unknown	Tile
Hagen-Renaker	Monrovia then San Dimas	1946–2021	Giftware, planters & figurines
Halcyon Art Pottery	Halcyon	1910–1913	Art pottery
Haldeman Pottery	Burbank	1933–1953	"Caliente" art ware & figurines
Hallfield Pottery	unknown	1950s	Figurines
Hamilton Pottery	Los Angeles	1930s	Figurines & art ware
Hardie-Arnita	El Segundo	1940s	Figurines
Harold Burress Pottery	North Hollywood	1950s	Giftware
Harold Johnson	Glendale	1940–1952	Art ware
Hedi Schoop	Hollywood	1940–1958	Art ware & figurines
Heirlooms of Tomorrow (California Originals after 1955)	Manhattan Beach	1944–1955	Figurines
Helen Greenleaf Lane	Upland	1874–1962	Tile
Hermione Ceramics	Glendale	1940s-1950s	Giftware & figurines
Hinkle of Monrovia	Monrovia	1940s	Kitchenware
Hispano-Moresque	Los Angeles	1927–1934	Tile
Hoffman Tile Company	Ontario	unknown	"Dequa" tile
Hollydale Potteries	Harbor City	1935–1959	“Malibu Modern” tableware
Howard Pierce Ceramics	LaVerne, after 1945 Claremont, after 1968 Joshua Tree	1941–1994	Giftware & figurines
Hueckel China and Porcelain Company, Inc.	El Monte	1948-	"Kaolina" art ware, & hotel ware
Italian Terra Cotta Company	Los Angeles	unknown	Architectural Terra Cotta & garden ware
Ivar of Hollywood	Hollywood	1940s	Art ware & figurines
Jane Callender	North Hollywood	1942-early 1950s	Figurines
Jane Holland	South Gate	1940s	Kitchenware
Jaru Art Products	Culver City	1950–1968	Art ware & figurines
Jaska of California	Los Angeles	1946-mid-1950s	Giftware & "Cascade Ware" tableware
Jean Goodwin Ames	Padua Hills, Claremont	1950s	Giftware & art ware
Jean Manley	North Hollywood	1940-50s	Figurines
Jean Read	unknown	1940s	Giftware
Jenev Studio Design	Los Angeles	1953–1959	Giftware & art ware
Johanna Ceramics	Costa Mesa	1940s	Art ware
Josef Originals	Monrovia	1946–1985	Figurines
Johannes Brahm	Los Angeles/Reseda	1945–1956	Giftware & art ware
Joy Thompson	Pasadena	1940s-1950s	Figurines
K & M Pottery	Los Angeles	unknown	Stoneware utilitarian wares
Karl Roma	unknown	1940s	Artware, figurines & giftware
Kay Finch Ceramics	Corona Del Mar	1940s-1963	Tableware, art ware, & figurines
Kaye of Hollywood	North Hollywood	early 1940s	Figurines
Kellems of Ceramics	Pasadena	1940s	Art ware
Kim Ward (formerly Kaye of Hollywood)	North Hollywood	late 1940s	Figurines
The Kiln of Sara Hume	Altadena	1940s	Art ware & figurines
Kinneloa Kiln	Los Angeles	1938–1951	"Batchhelder Ceramics" art ware
Kipp Ceramics	Pasadena	late 1940s	Art ware & figurines
Knowles, Taylor, and Knowles	Burbank	1940s	Art ware & figurines
Kraftile	Niles	1926–1997	Tile
L.A. Pressed Brick	Los Angeles	1887–1926	Brick, architectural terra cotta & tile
La Mirada Potteries	Los Angeles	1935–1939	Tableware, art ware & figurines
La Cañada	Newhall	1930s-1940s	Tableware, kitchenware & art ware
Landaker Original Ceramics	Los Angeles	1940s	Art ware & figurines
Lane	Van Nuys	1940s-1950s	TV lamps & planters
Lee Wollard	Burbank	1946–1951	Figurines & art ware
Leneige China	Burbank	1934–1955	Tableware & art ware
Lester of California	Pasadena	1950s	Figurines
Los Angeles Potteries	Lynwood	1940s-1971	Tableware, cookie jars, & kitchenware
Los Angeles Stoneware Company (Douglass Clay Products Company after 1903)	Los Angeles	1900–1903	Sewer pipe
Lucie Watkins	Los Angeles	1940s	Figurines & art ware
M & L Manufacturing Company	Azusa	1950s	"De Maray" tableware & art ware
Mackie Artware	Corona Del Mar	1940s-1950s	Figurines & art ware
Madeline Originals	Pasadena	1948–present	Art ware & garden ware
Maddux of California	Los Angeles	1938–1976	Art ware, giftware & figurines
Malibu Ceramic Works	Topanga	1979–present	Tile, pots, terra cotta floor tile
Malibu Potteries	Malibu	1926–1932	Tile
Marc Bellaire, Inc.	Culver City	1953-early 1960s	Giftware, figurines & art ware
Marcia Ceramics of California	Los Angeles	early 1940s-unknown	Cookie jars, giftware & figurines
Markham Pottery	National City	1913–1921	Art ware
Markoff	Inglewood	1926–1945	Tile
Marsh Industries	Glendale, after 1959 Los Angeles	1950-	"French Chef Cookware" cookware and "California Giftware" giftware
Mary Jane Hart	Los Angeles	1940s	"Copa de Oro" figurines
Maybrik	Los Angeles	unknown	Tile
Mathew Adams	Los Angeles	1960s	Art ware
Max P.H. Schonfeld	Los Angeles	1939-late 1950s	"Kaolina" artware & giftware
Maxine Cloud	Hawthorne	1945–1953	Giftware & art ware
McCarty Brothers	Sierra Madre	1940s	Giftware & figurines
Mc Me Productions	Simi Valley	1980s	Cookie Jars
McAffee	San Gabriel	1940s	Art ware
Mel Ceramics	Torrance	1950s	Tableware & art ware
Meyers/California Rainbow Pottery	Vernon	1930s-1940s	Tableware, kitchenware & art ware
Miramar of California	Los Angeles	1950s-1960s	Tableware, kitchenware & art ware
Mission China Company	Los Angeles	unknown	Hotel & restaurant ware
Modglin's Originals	Los Angeles	1940–1945	Figurines
Moreno Ceramics	Pomona	1971-unknown	Flower pots & figural planters
Nipedal Manufacturing Co.	Pasadena	1940s	"Pas Cal" figurines & giftware
Northington Inc.	Los Angeles	1950s	Tableware
Orange Grove Pottery	Burbank	1948–1974	Tableware, giftware & planters
Padre	Los Angeles	1930s-1940s	Tableware, kitchenware, art ware & figurines
Pacific Art Tile Company (Western Art Tile Company after 1904	Los Angeles (Tropico)	1902–1904	Tile
Pacific Sewer Pipe Company (Pacific Clay Products after 1916)	Los Angeles, Los Nietos	1910–1916	Sewer pipe
Pat and Covey Stewart	Laguna Beach	1940s	Art ware
Peterson Studios	El Segundo	1950s	Art ware
Phyllis Lester	Los Angeles	1940s	Art ware
Pillin Pottery	Los Angeles	early 1948-1992	Art ware
Pixie Potters (Millicent Andrews)	Los Angeles	1939–1954	" Millesan Drews Miniature Pixies" figurines
Poinsettia Ceramics	Baldwin Park	1940s	Giftware
Pomona Tile Manufacturing Co.	Pomona	1923–1976	Tile
Potters Associated	Paramount	unknown	Tableware
Poxon China Products	Vernon	1912–1928	Tile & tableware
Pro Artisans	Manhattan Beach	unknown	Lamps
Proutyline Products (American Encaustic Tiling Co. after 1926)	Hermosa Beach	1921–1926	Tile
Raymond Koechlin	Los Angeles	1940s	Art ware
Rembrant Pottery	Laguna Beach	1930s	Art ware
Renaker-Brazel	Leucadia	1974–1992	Miniature figurines
Rhead Pottery	Santa Barbara	1913–1917	Tile
Ridgewood China	Los Angeles	1940s	Tableware
Rio Hondo	El Monte	1939-mid-1950s	Figurines
Riverside Ceramics	Riverside County	1946–1947	Zeisel tableware
Robaul of California	unknown	1940s-1950s	Art ware
Robert Maxwell Studio	Venice	1960s-1970s	"Robert Maxwell Stoneware" art ware, planters, figurines
Robert Simmons	Costa Mesa	1940s-1950s	Giftware & figurines
Robertson/Hollywood Pottery	Los Angeles	1934–1952	Art ware
Robyn Ceramics	Fallbrook, after 1955 Idyllwild	1940s-1950s	Figurines
Rose S. Shep	Seal Beach	1948–1963	Tableware, giftware, planters, & lamps
The Rose Crown China Co.	Pasadena	1940s	Giftware
Roselane Pottery	Pasadena	1938–1977	Giftware, art ware & figurines
Ross	Laguna Beach, then Hawthorne	1940s	Figurines
Rothman Stoneware	Los Angeles	1971–1982	"Rothwoman" kitchenware, & tableware
Roy John of Wilmar California	Wilmar	1940s	Figurines
Rumph	unknown	1960s-1970s	Art ware & mugs
Saar	Lawndale, then El Segundo	1950–1962	Art ware, tableware, & giftware
San Vallé Tile Kilns	Los Angeles	1952-unknown	Tableware
Santa Anita	Los Angeles	1940s-1950s	Tableware & kitchenware
Santa Barbara Ceramic Design	Santa Barbara	1976-unknown	Giftware & art ware
Sascha Brastoff Ceramics	Los Angeles	1947–1963	Tableware, art ware, & figurines
Sasha Studios (Sasha Katchamakoff)	Los Angeles	1950s	Figurines
Sierra Vista Ceramics	Sierra Vista, after 1951 Phoenix, Arizona	1942–1958	Cookie jars & giftware
S-Squire Ceramics	Los Angeles	1943–1950	Giftware & figurines
Southern California Ceramic Company/California Art Products, Inc.	Santa Monica/Los Angeles	1945–1953	"Orchard" "Hollywood Ware" tableware
Southern California Clay Products (California Clay Products after 1923)	Vernon	1917–1923	Chemical stoneware
Southern California Coal and Clay Company (Pacific Sewer Pipe Company after 1910)	Lake Elsinore	1886–1910	Sewer pipe
Starnes (Walter Starnes)	Los Angeles	1952–1954	Tableware
Stewart B. McCulloch	unknown	1940s	Figurines & art ware
Sunshine Ceramics of Los Angeles	Los Angeles	1940s	Giftware
Susi Singer	Pasadena	1935–1955	Figurines
Sy Alan Designs	Canoga Park	unknown	Lamps
Sylvan Ceramics	Pasadena	1943-	art ware
Sylvia Hood Designs	Pasadena	1960–1965	Figurines
Taylor Tilery	Santa Monica	1930–1941	Tile
Tony Hill-Wilmer James	Los Angeles	late 40s-early 50s	Art ware
Treasure Craft – Pottery Craft	Gardena and South Gate, then Compton	1955–1995	Giftware, kitchenware, & figurines
Triangle Studios (Vallona Starr Ceramics)	Los Angeles/El Monte	1930–1953	Novelty giftware, kitchenware & art ware
Tropico Potteries (Gladding, McBean & Co. after 1923)	Los Angeles	1921–1923	Tile, architectural terra cotta & sewer pipe
Tudor Art Tile Company (Tudor Potteries)	Los Angeles	1927–1939	Tile, art ware, garden ware & figurines
Twin Winton	Pasadena, then San Juan Capistrano	1936–1975	Giftware, kitchenware, & figurines
Vadna of California	Leucadia	1940s-1950s	Tableware & art ware
Valentien Pottery Company	San Diego	1911–1913	Art pottery
Valley Vista Ceramics	Los Angeles	1946–1962	Giftware
Vally Werner	Los Angeles	1940s	Art ware
Van Straaton Company	Santa Monica	1940s	Art ware
Vee Jackson	San Gabriel then Pasadena	1946–1976	Giftware
Vessel USA Inc.	San Diego	1998–present	Planters
Victoria Ceramics	San Juan Capistrano	1940s	Figurines
Vitrefrax Company	Los Angeles	unknown	Insulators
Vohann of California	Laguna Beach/Capistrano Beach/San Clemente	1950–present	Art ware & giftware
Wade Ceramics	North Hollywood	1965–1967	Art ware & kitchenware
Walker Potteries	Monrovia	1945–1952	Figurines
Walker-Renaker	Monrovia	1952–1959	Figurines
Wallace China Company	Huntington Park	1931–1964	Restaurant ware
Walter Wilson	Pasadena	1943–1954	Giftware & figurines
Weil of California (California Figurine Company prior to 1946)	Los Angeles	1946–1955	"Weil Ware" giftware, artware, tableware & figurines
West Coast Tile Company (American Encaustic Tiling Company after 1919)	Vernon	1914–1919	Tile
West Coast	Burbank	1940s-1950s	Art ware, giftware & figurines
Western Art Tile Company (Tropico Potteries after 1921)	Los Angeles (Tropico)	early 1904-1920	Tile
Western Quarry Tiles	Monrovia	1959–present	Garden ware & tile
Whiting-Mead Company	Los Angeles	unknown	Sanitary ware & garden ware
Wildwood Ceramics	Pasadena	1940s-1950s	Giftware
Will-George (became The Claysmiths in 1945)	Pasadena	1934–1945	Giftware & figurines
William Bonzi	Pasadena	1945-1950s	"Bonzi" giftware, artware & tableware
William Manker Ceramics	Padua Hills – Claremont	1933-late 1950s	Art ware & figurines
Wilmer James	Los Angeles	1940s	Art ware
Winfield Pottery – Gabriel Porcelain Pottery	Pasadena	1929–1962	"Winfield" "Gabriel Porcelain" tableware, art ware & figurines
Winifred Cole of California	Van Nuys	1967-	Giftware
Wolper Art Studios	Los Angeles	1948-unknown	Tableware & giftware
Yerbysmith Ceramics	Laguna Beach	1940s	Art ware
Ynez	Inglewood	1940s-1950s	Figurines
Yona Ceramics	Los Angeles	1952–1957	Giftware & figurines

== Gallery ==
=== Tile ===
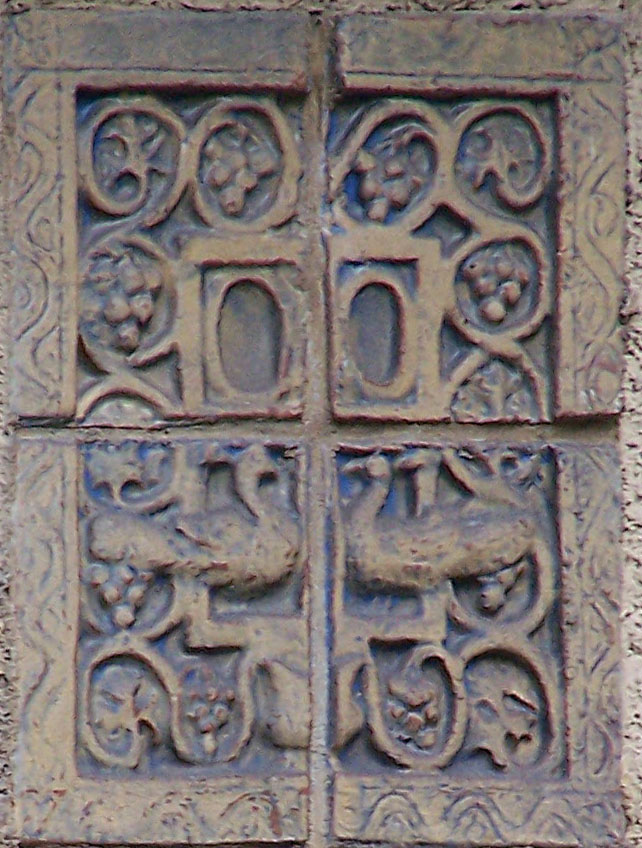
Batchelder tile, detail on chimney of Batchelder house, Pasadena.

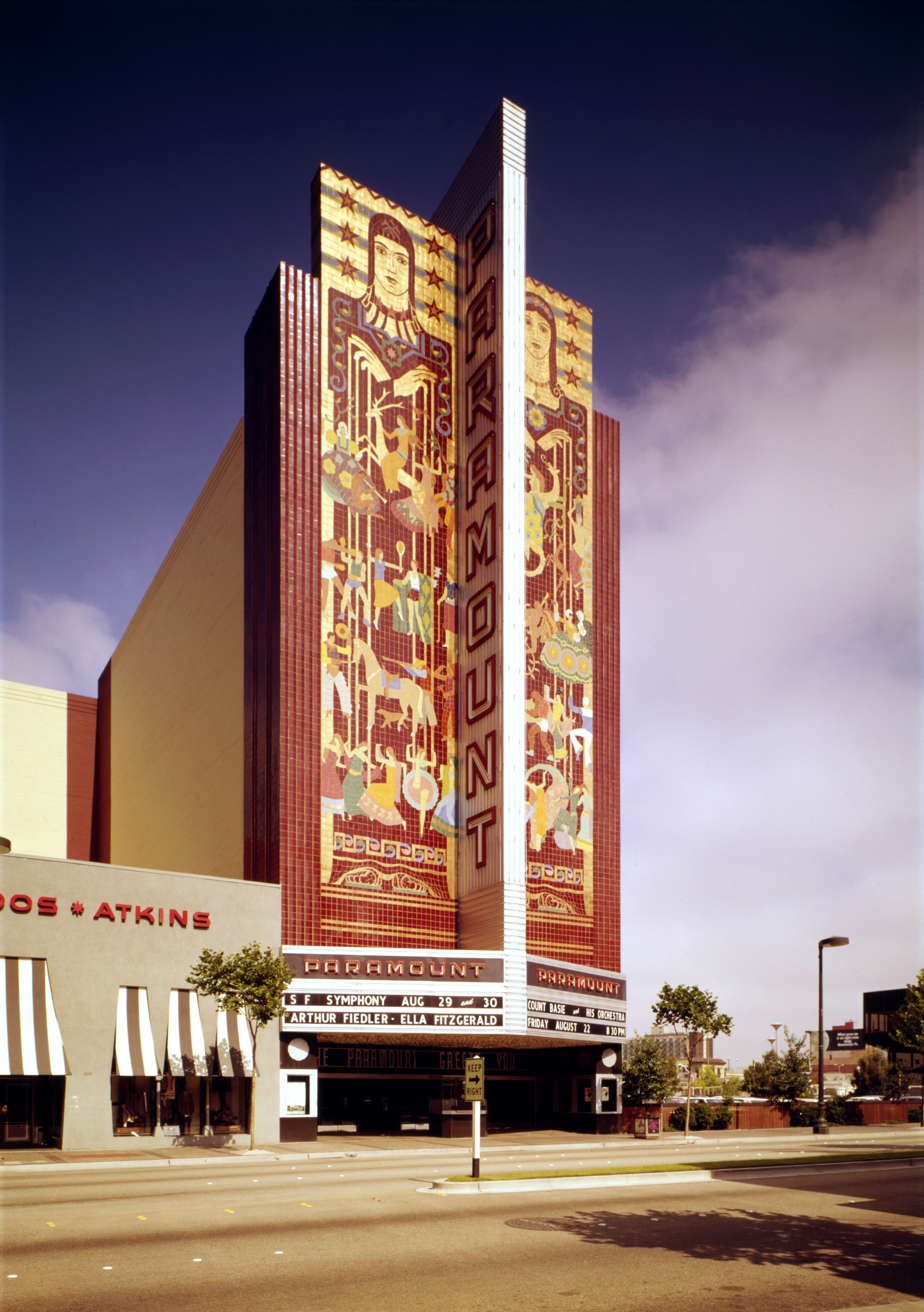
Paramount Theater tile mural by Gladding, McBean & Co., Oakland.

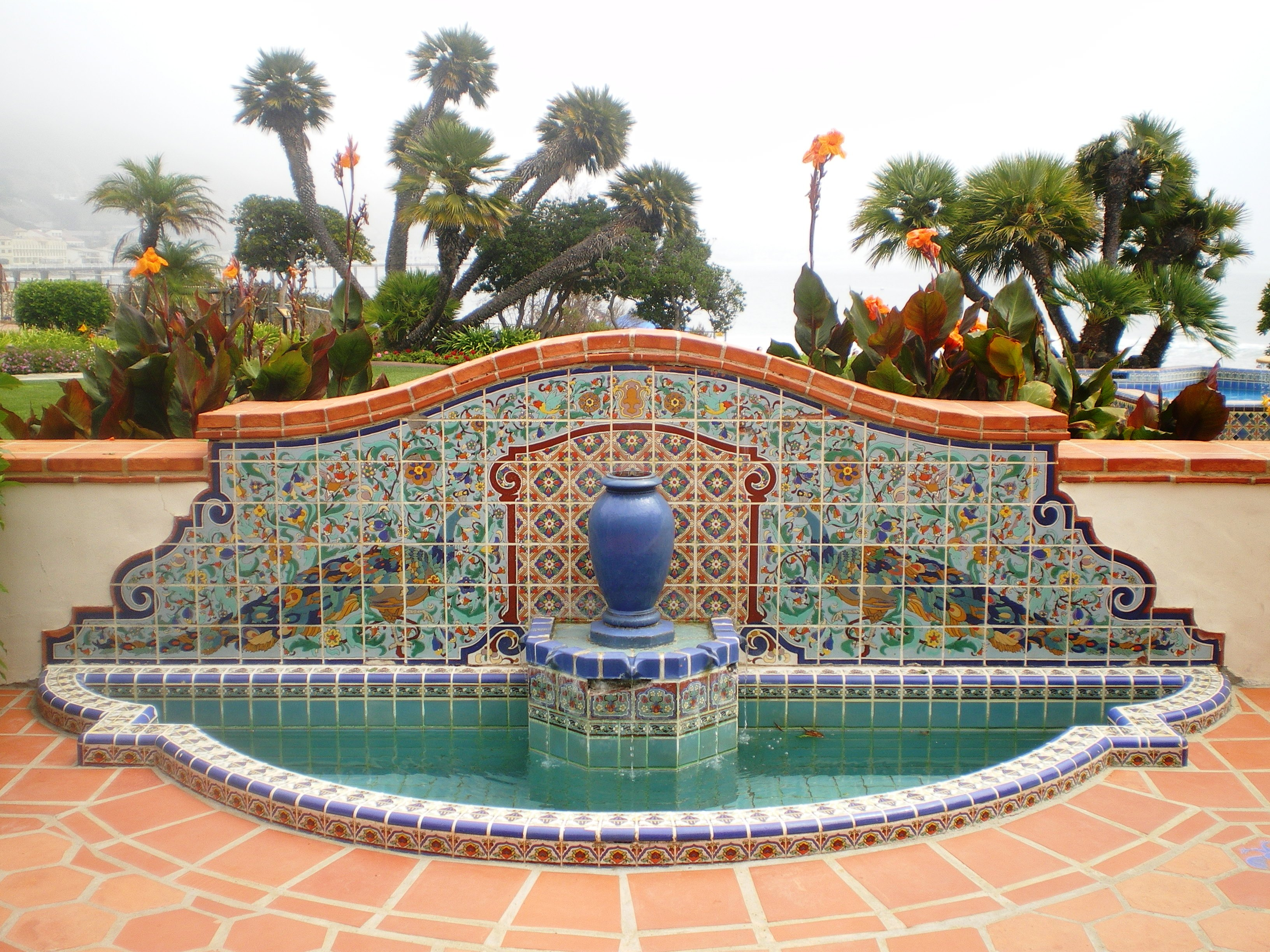
Malibu Potteries peacock fountain, Adamson house, Malibu.

=== Art ware and giftware ===
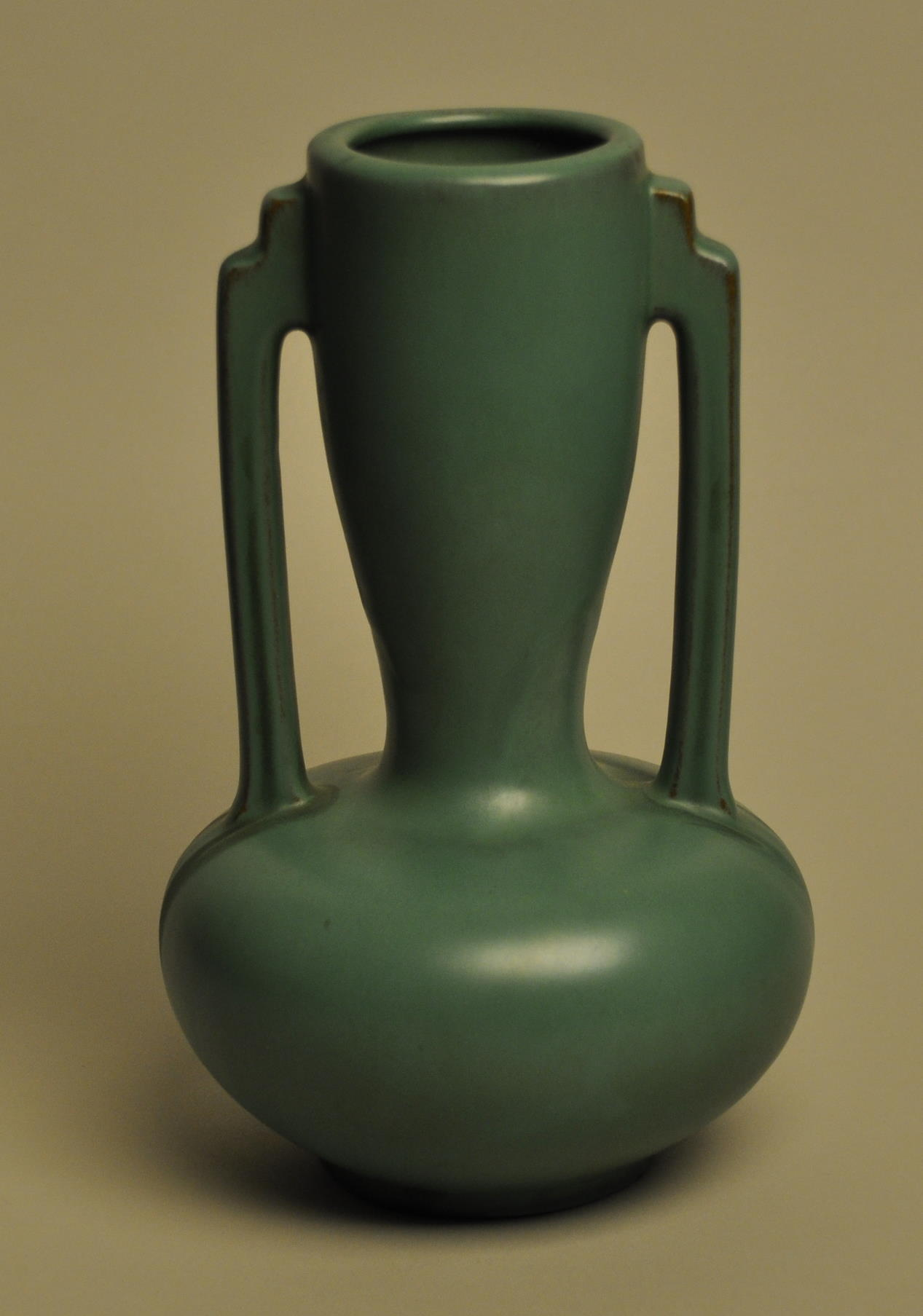
Catalina Clay Products Catalina Pottery art ware vase.

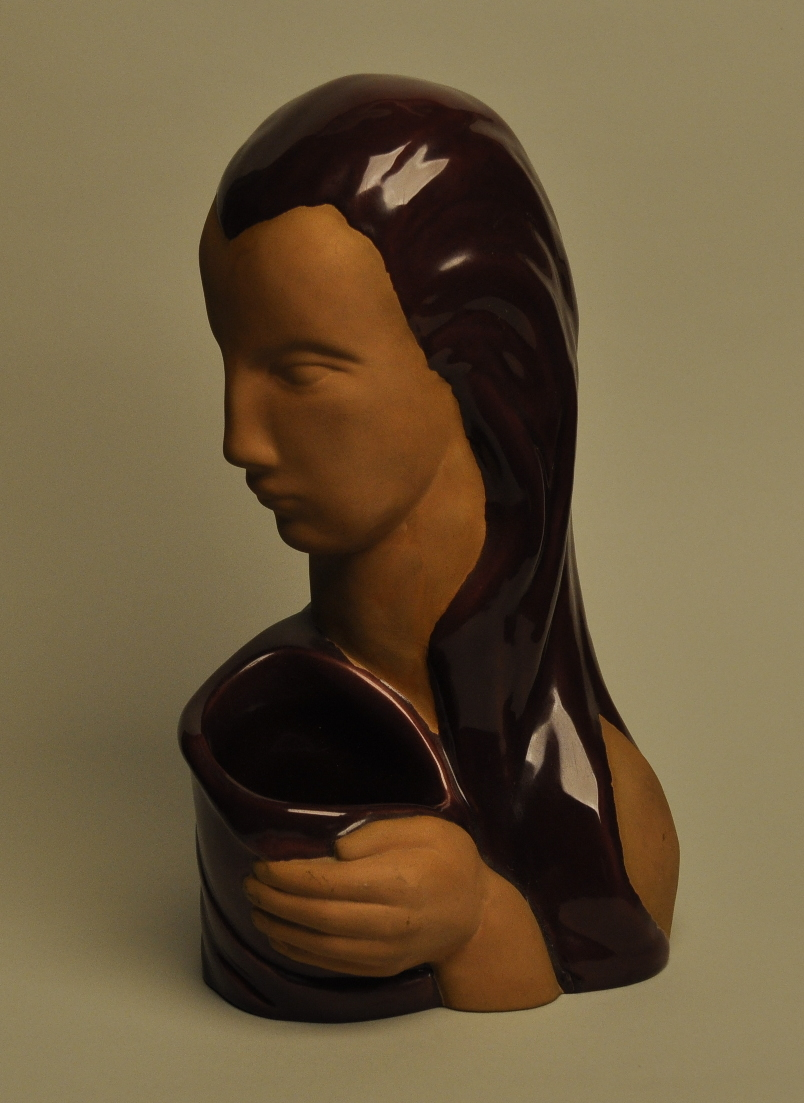
Gladding, McBean & Co. Catalina Pottery Art Ware head vase.

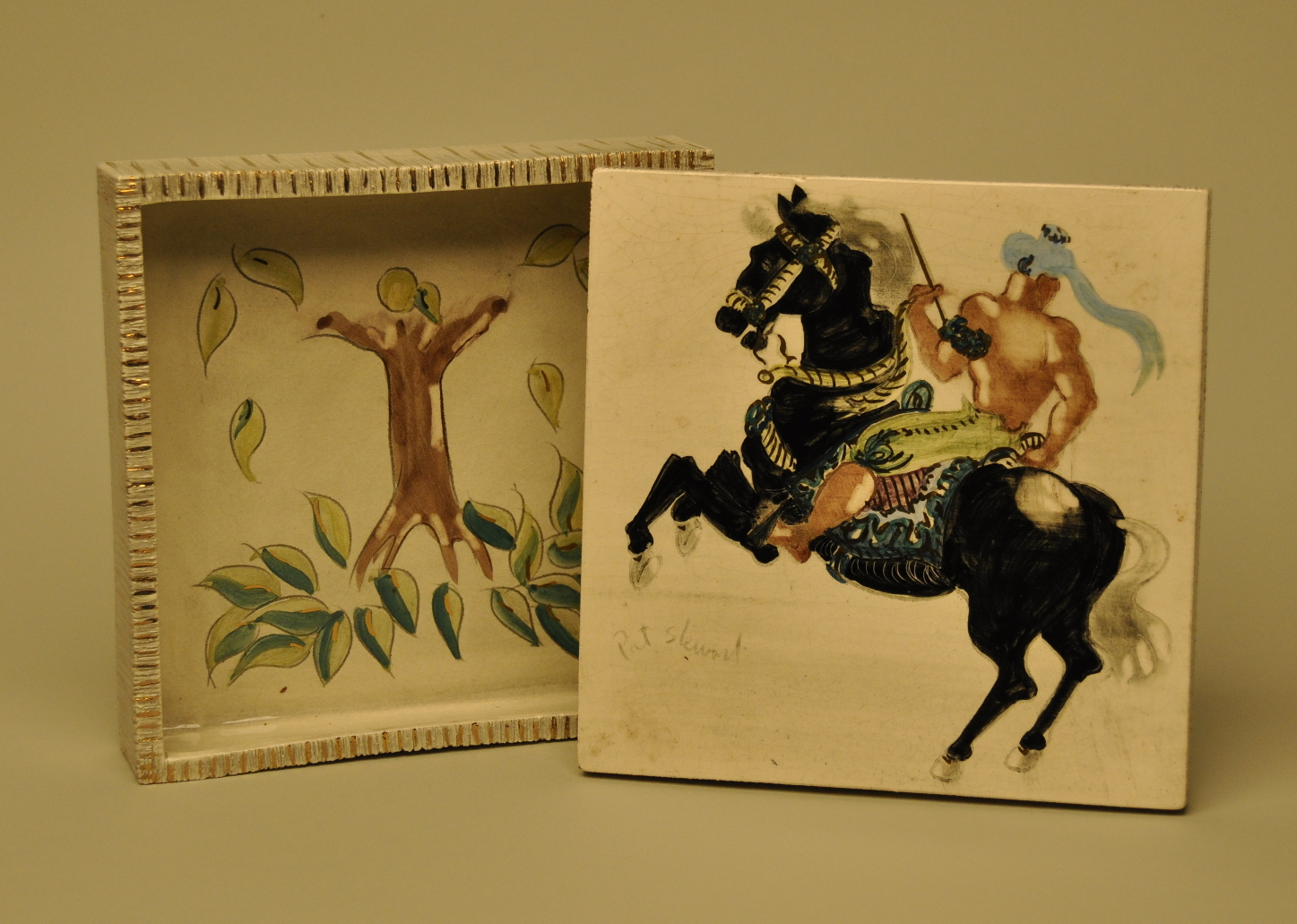
Pat and Covey Stewart covered box with lid.

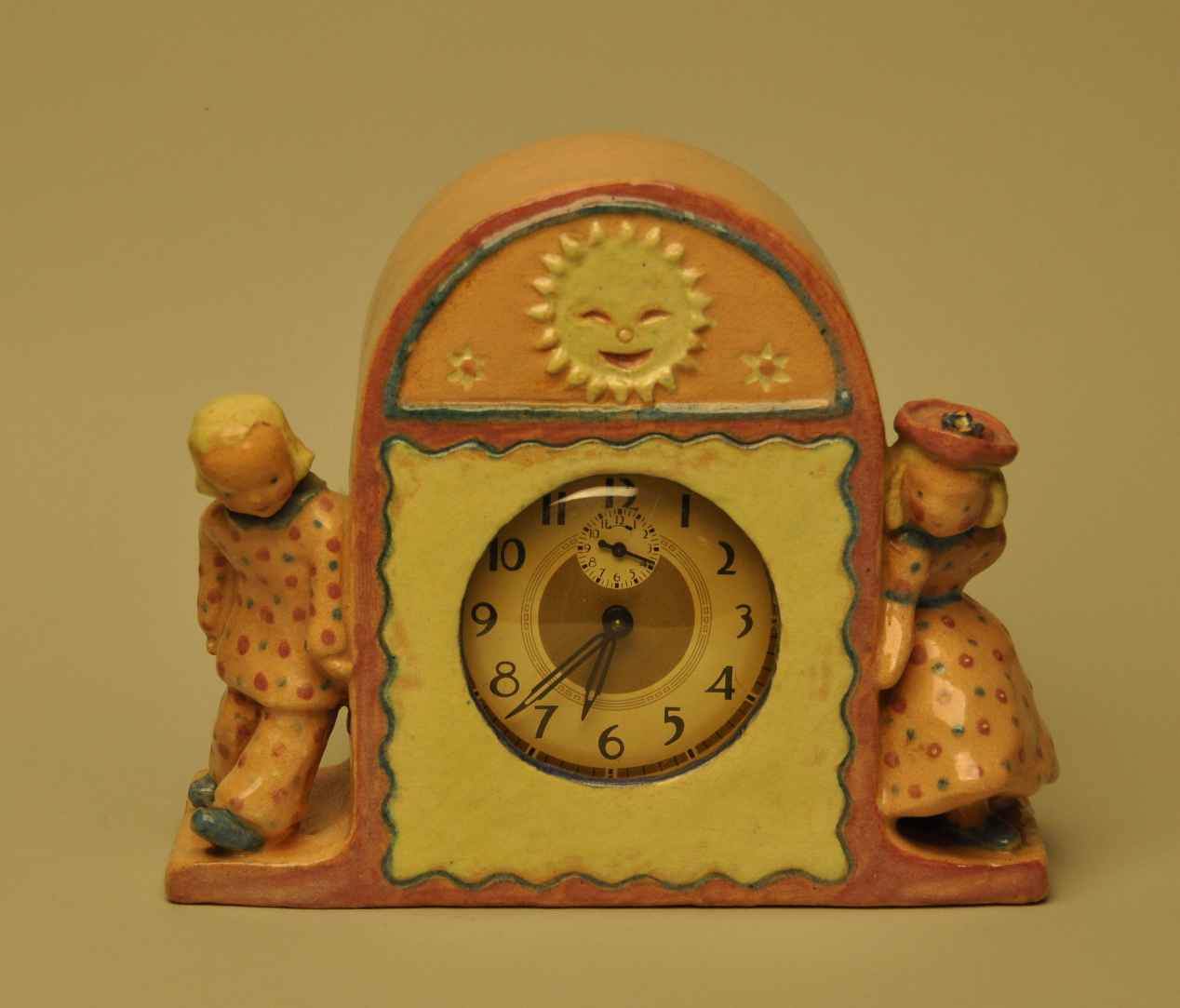
Karl Roma clock.

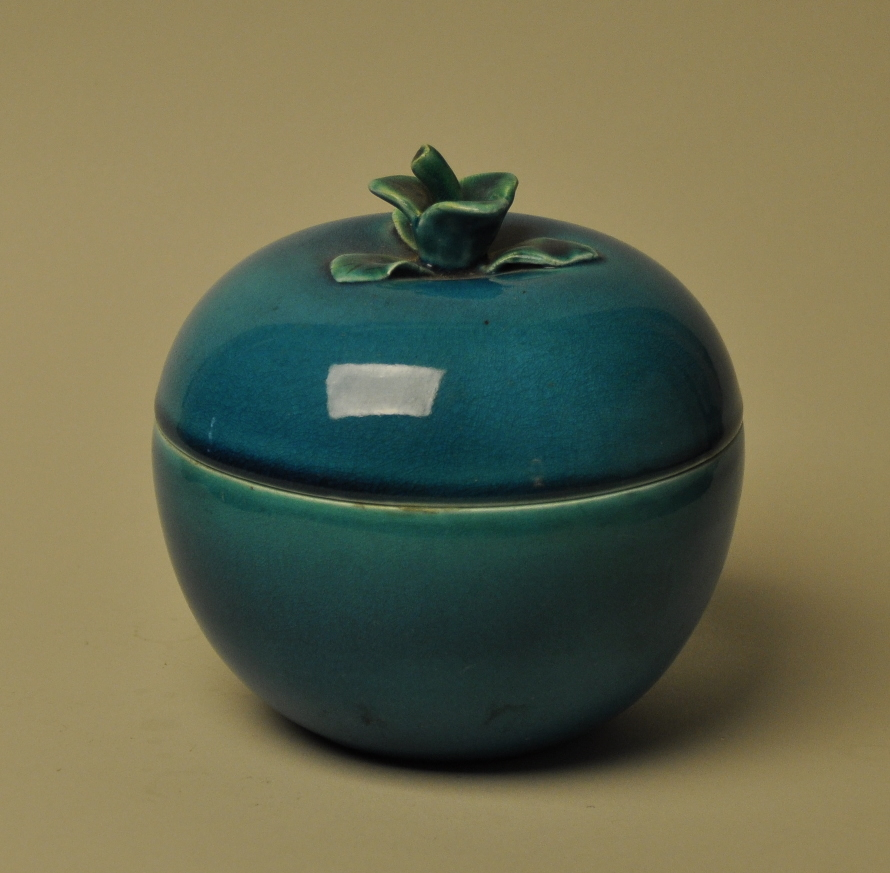
Robertson Hollywood covered jar.

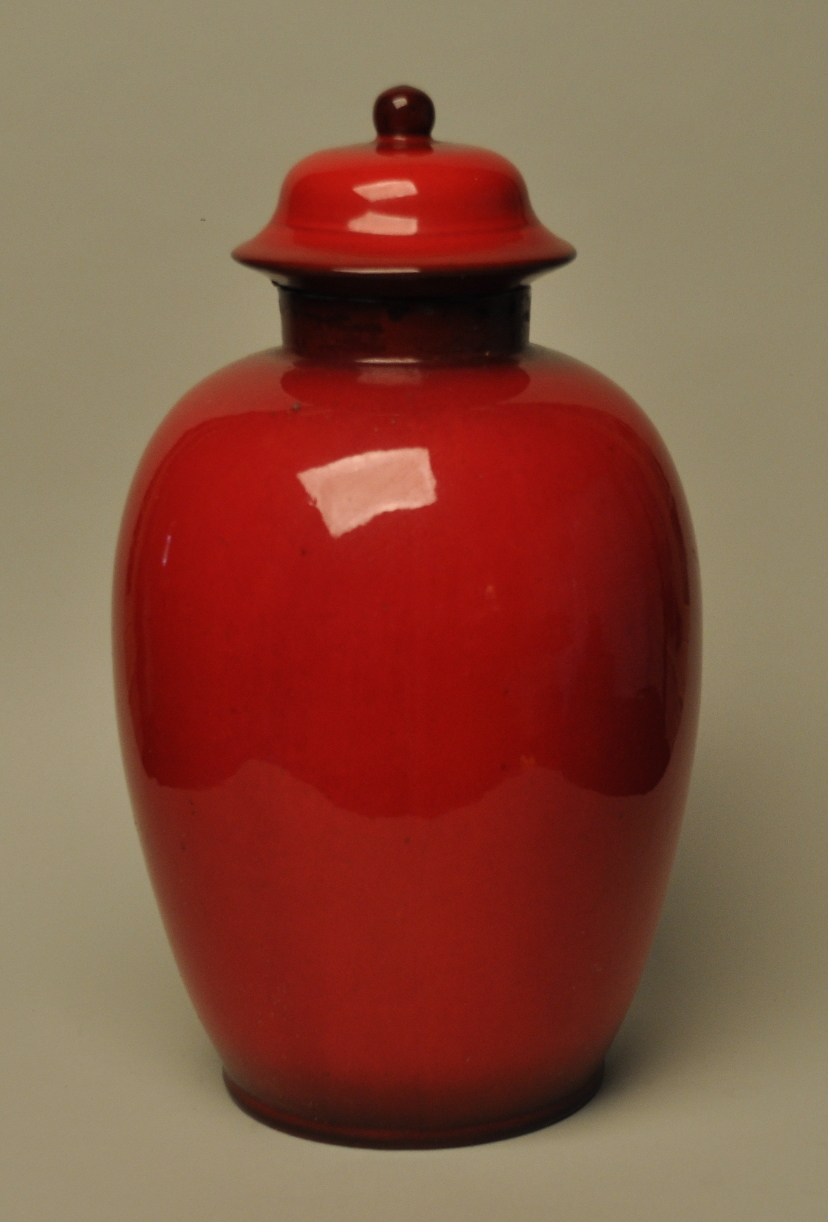
Brad Keeler Ming Dragon Blood covered ginger jar.

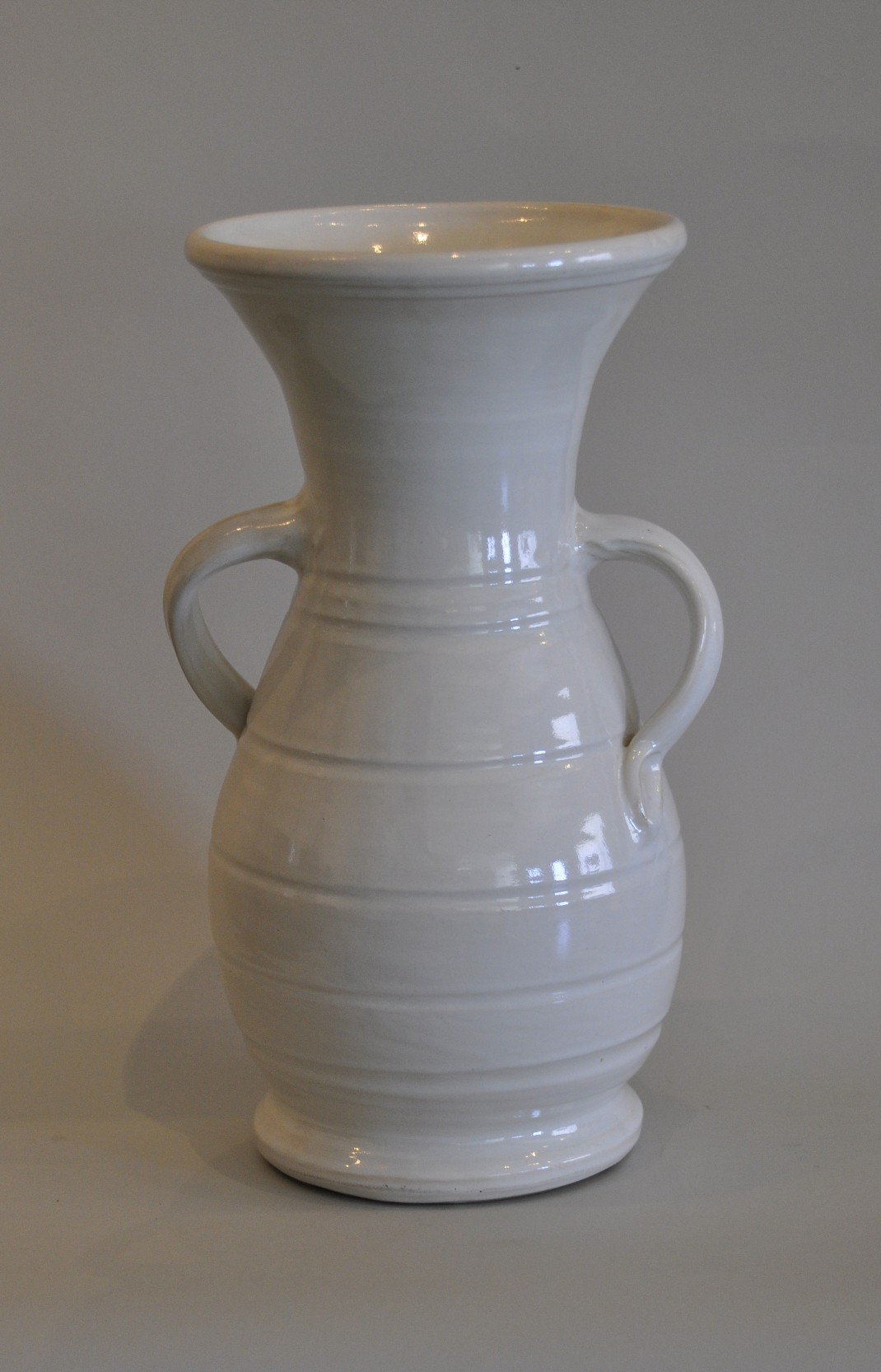
Bauer Pottery two handled vase by Matt Carlton.

=== Figurines ===
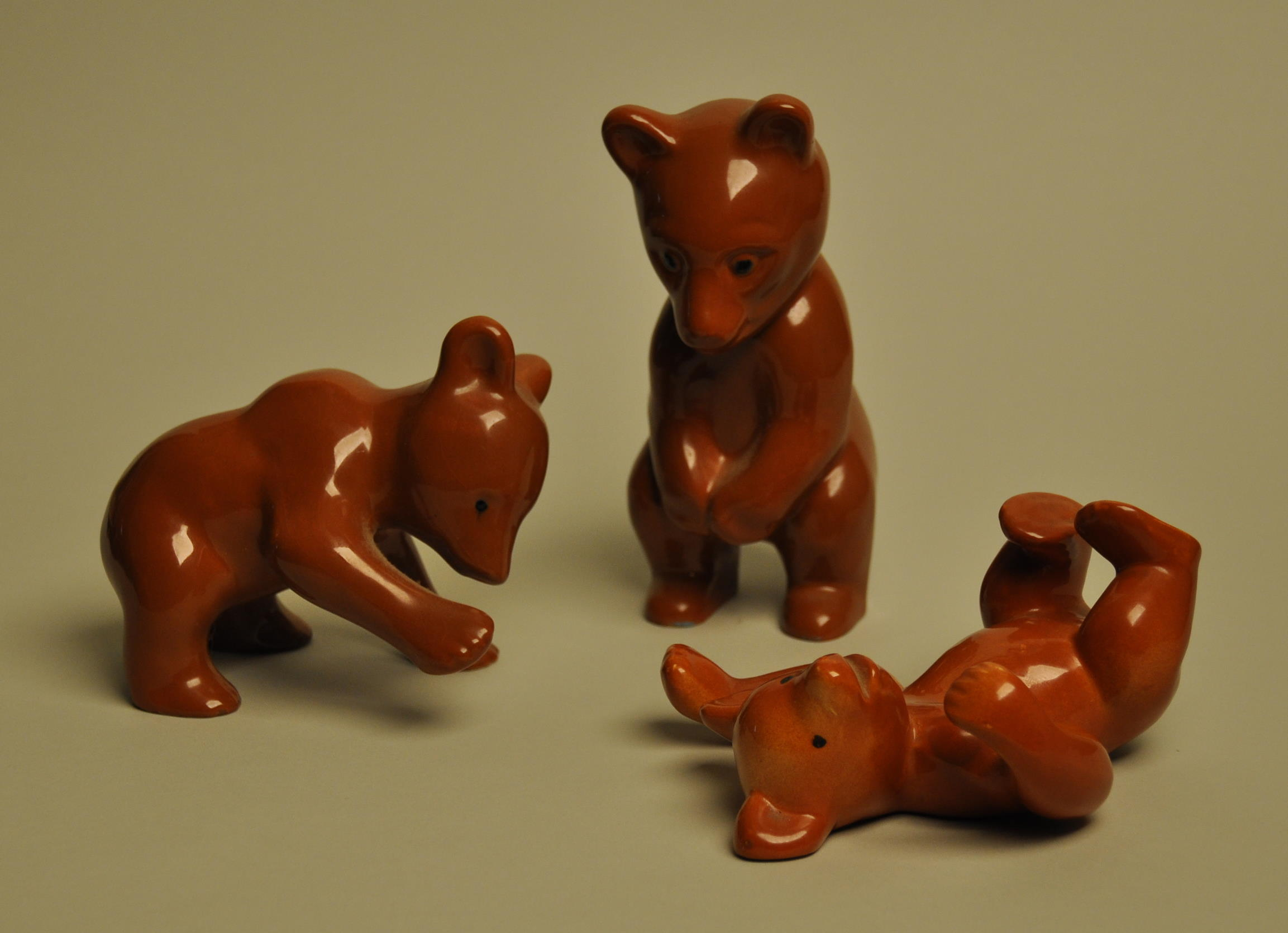
Metlox Manufacturing Company bear figurines.

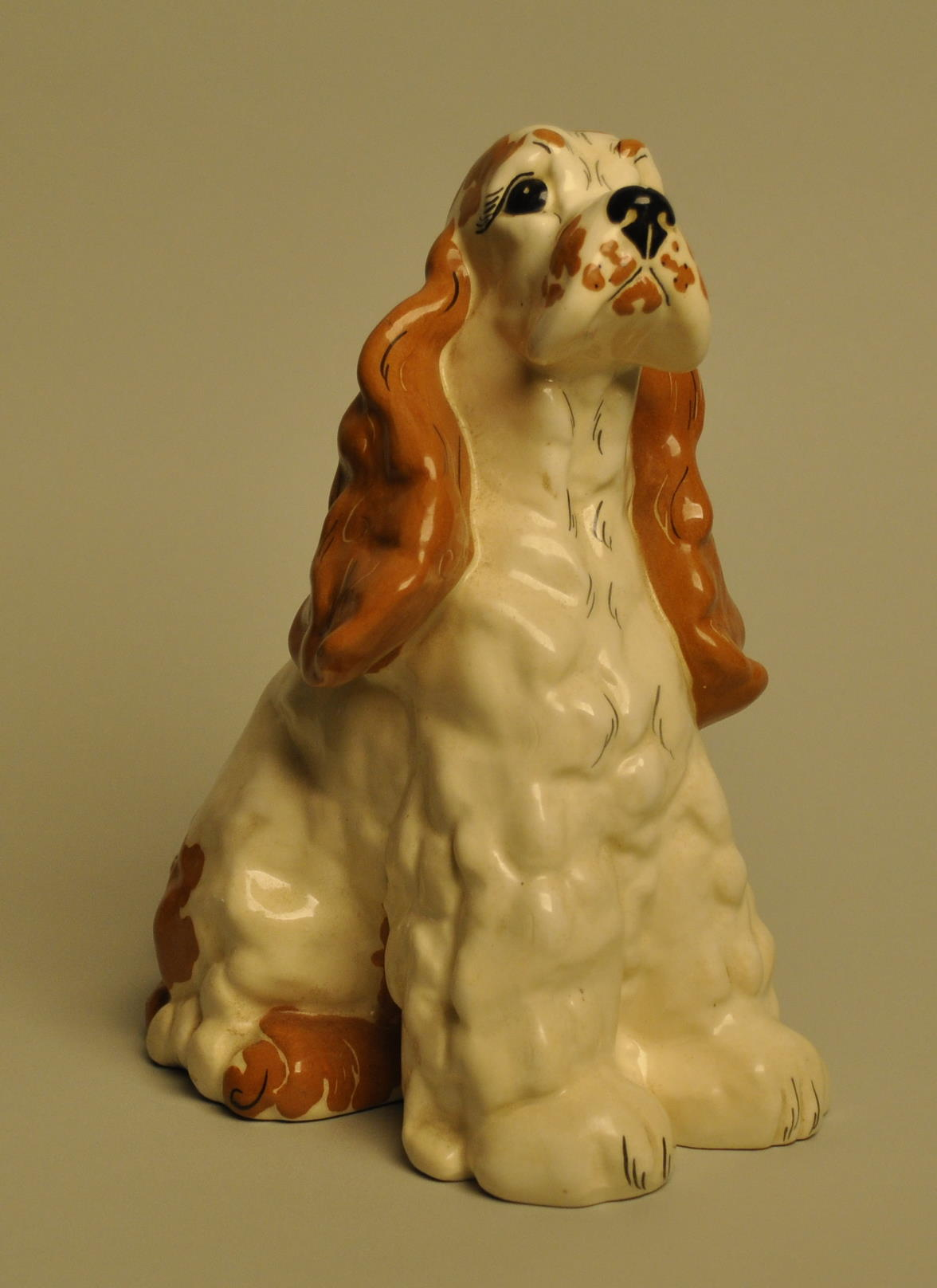
Kay Finch Ceramics Cocker Spaniel dog figurine.

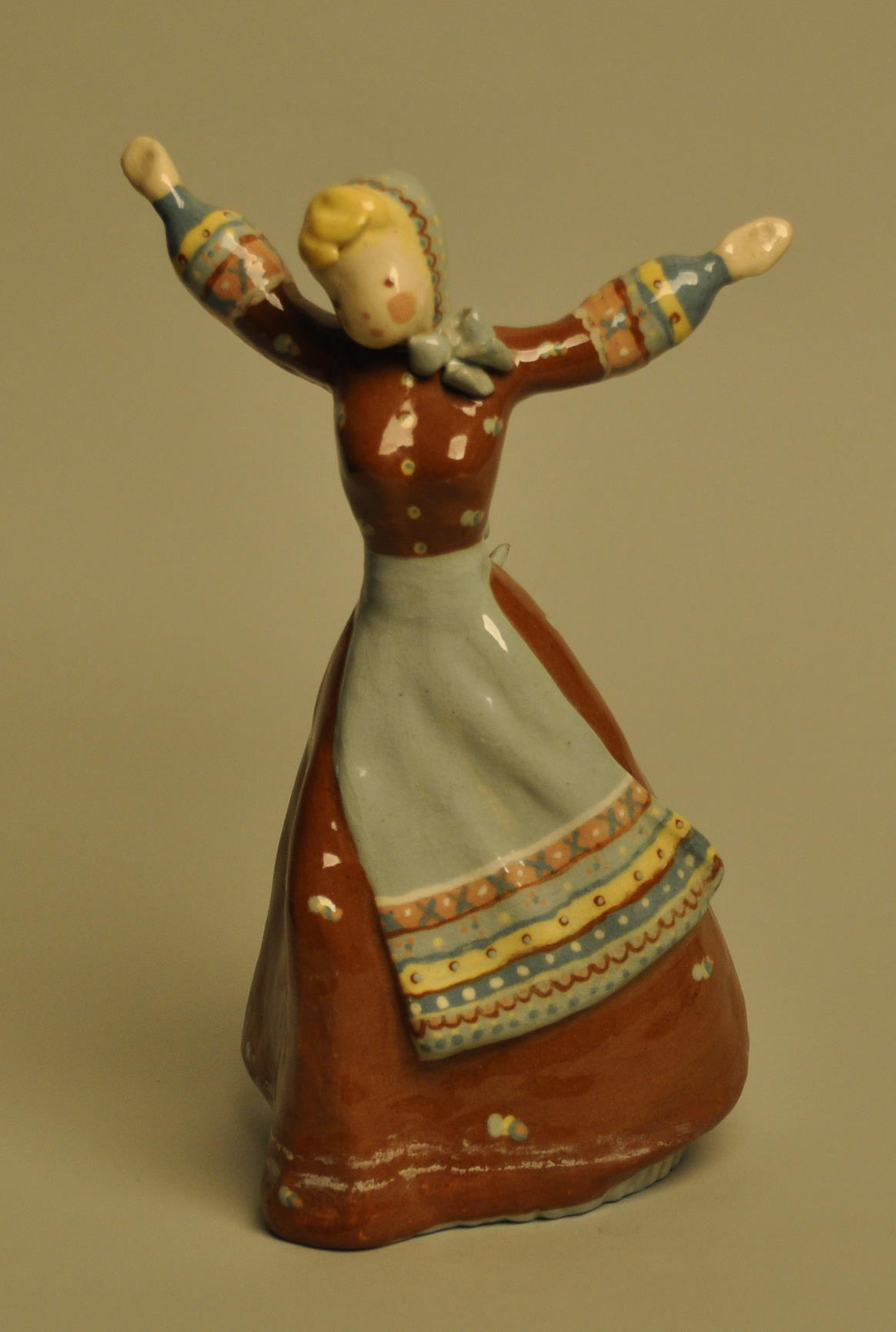
Jean Manley peasant girl figurine.

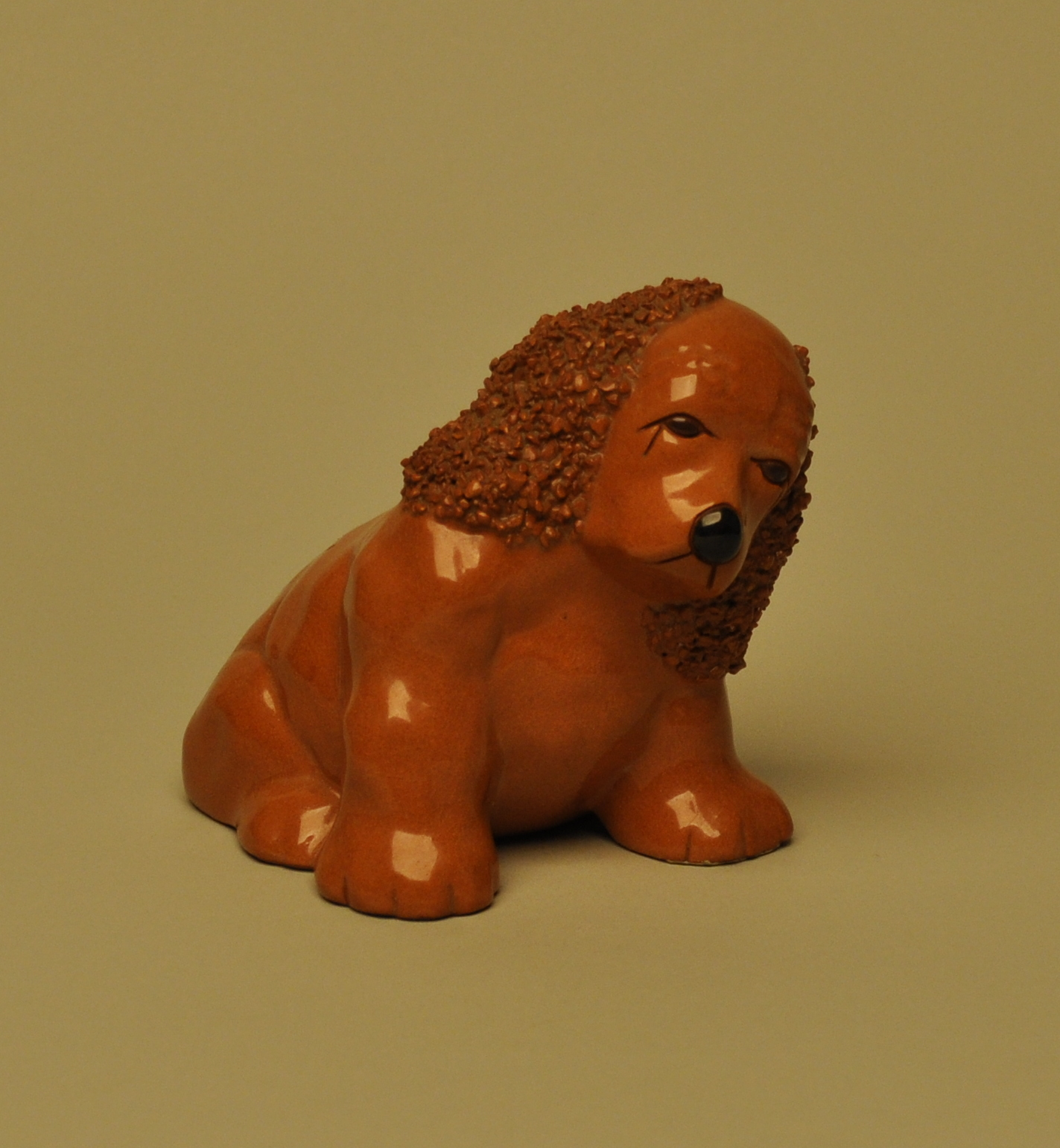
Kay the Potter (Kay Kinney) dog figurine.

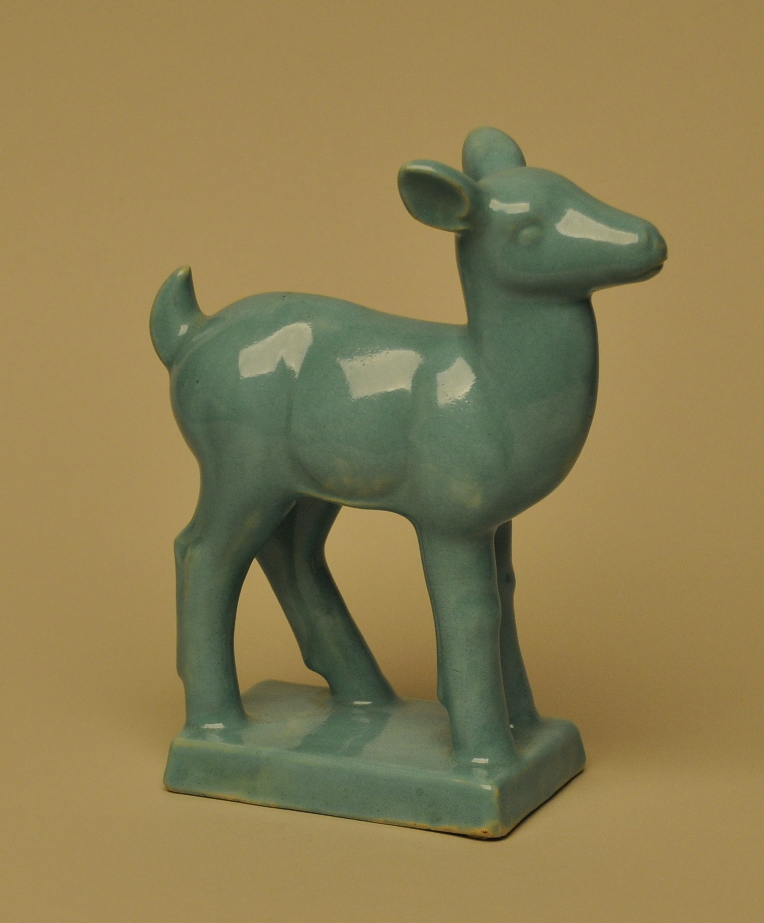
Sorcha Boru deer figurine.

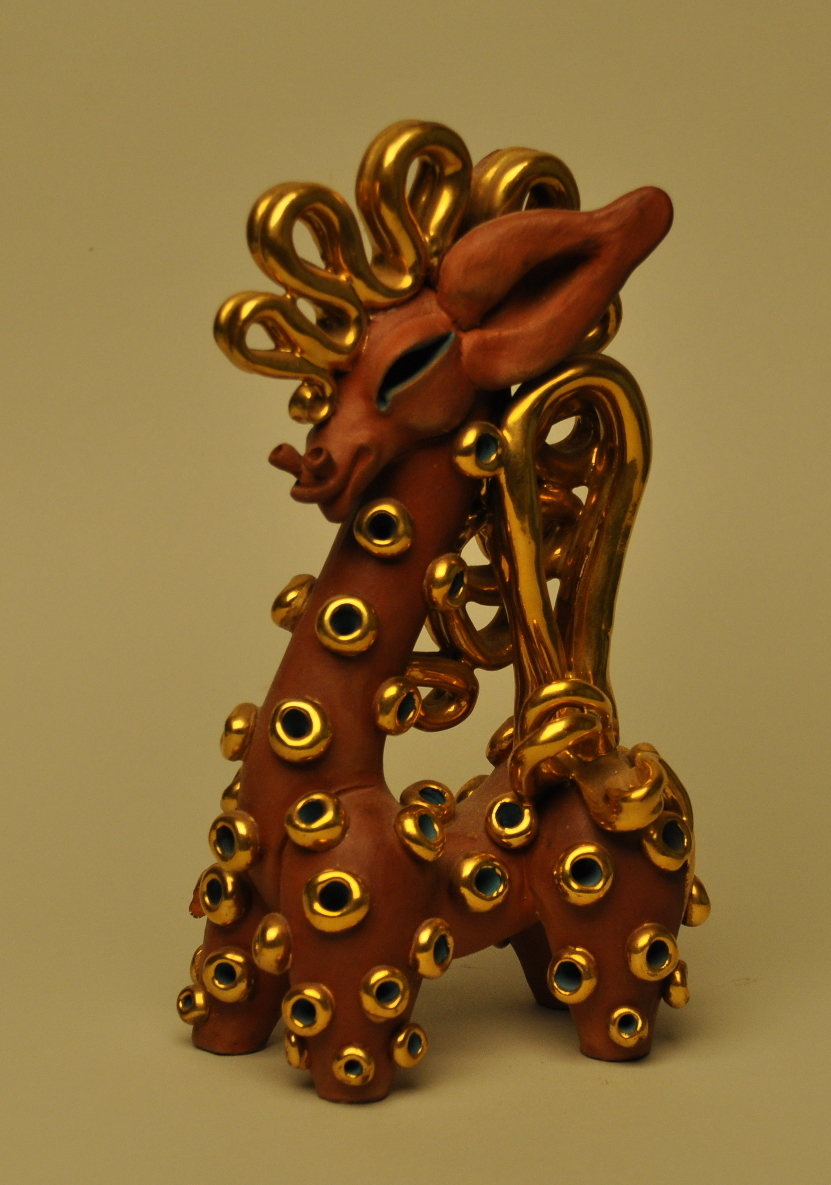
Copa de Oro (Mary Jane Hart) horse figurine.

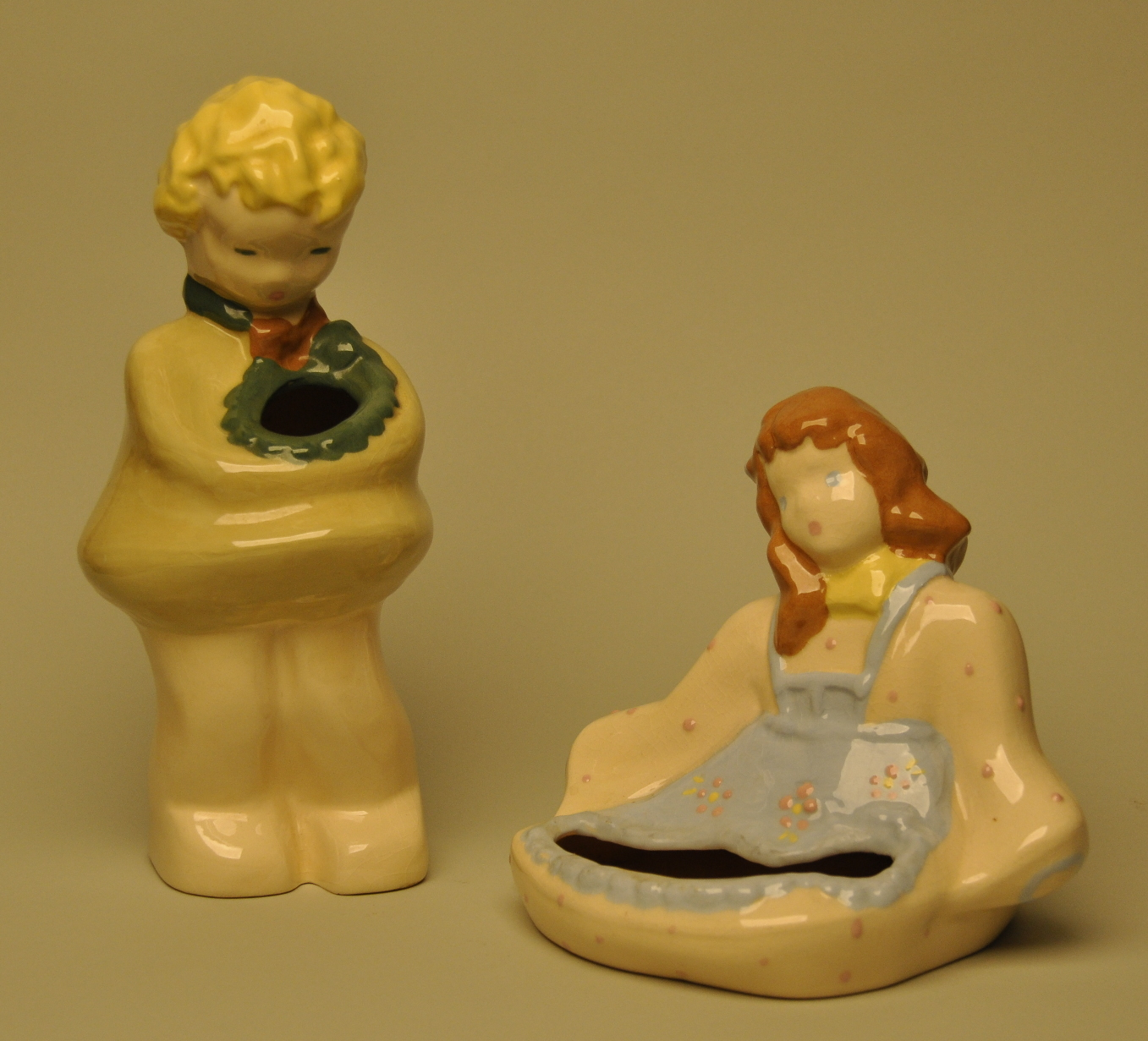
California Figurine Company Weil Ware girl figurines.

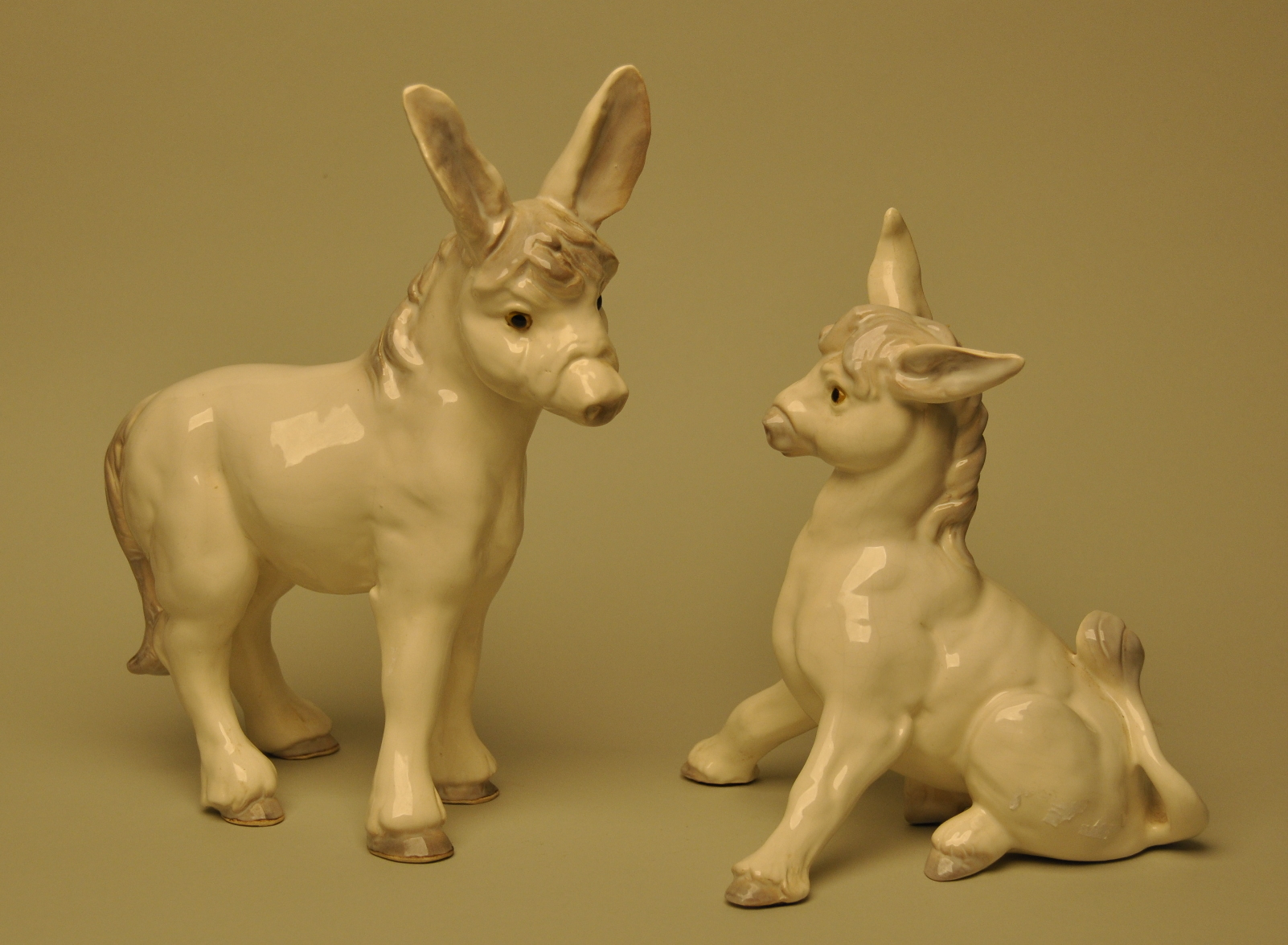
Freeman McFarlin burro figurines by Kay Finch.

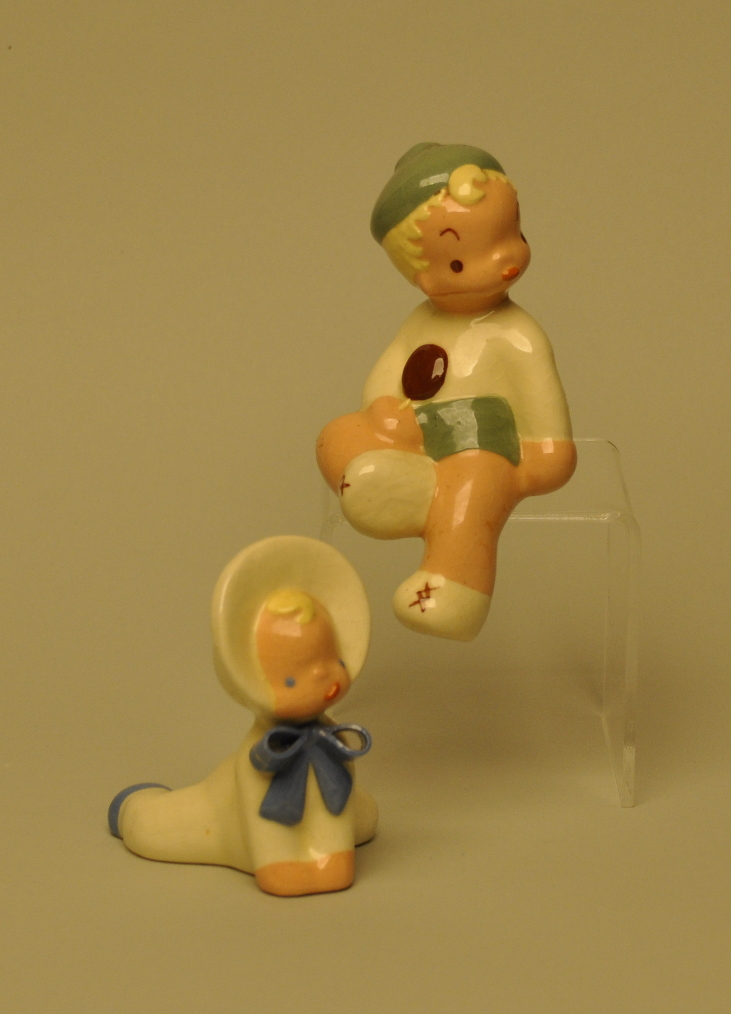
Jane Fauntz baby and sitting boy figurines.

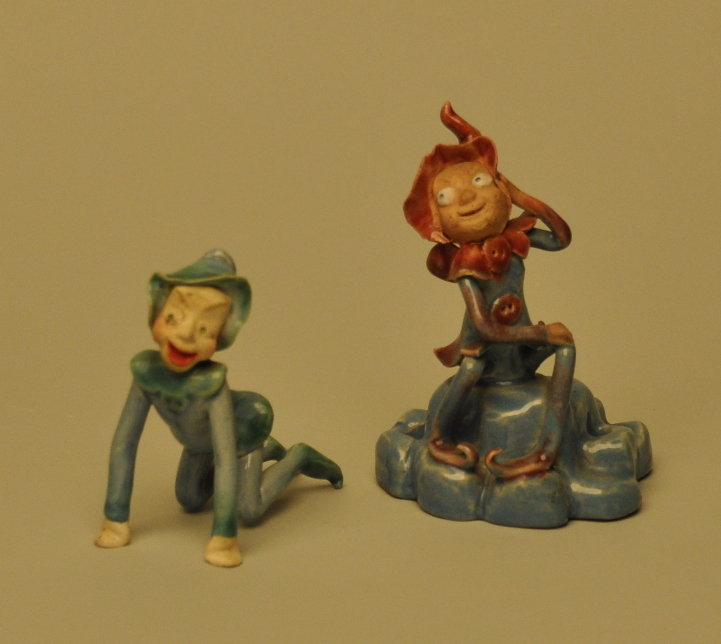
Pixie Potters Millesan Drews Pixies by Millicent Andrews.

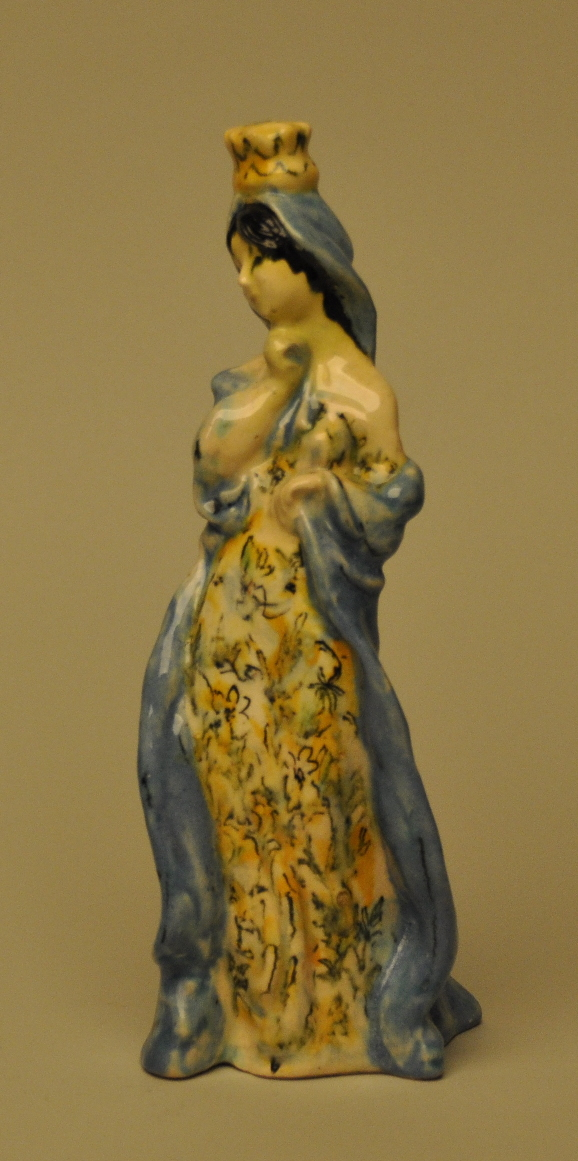
Susi Singer lady figurine.

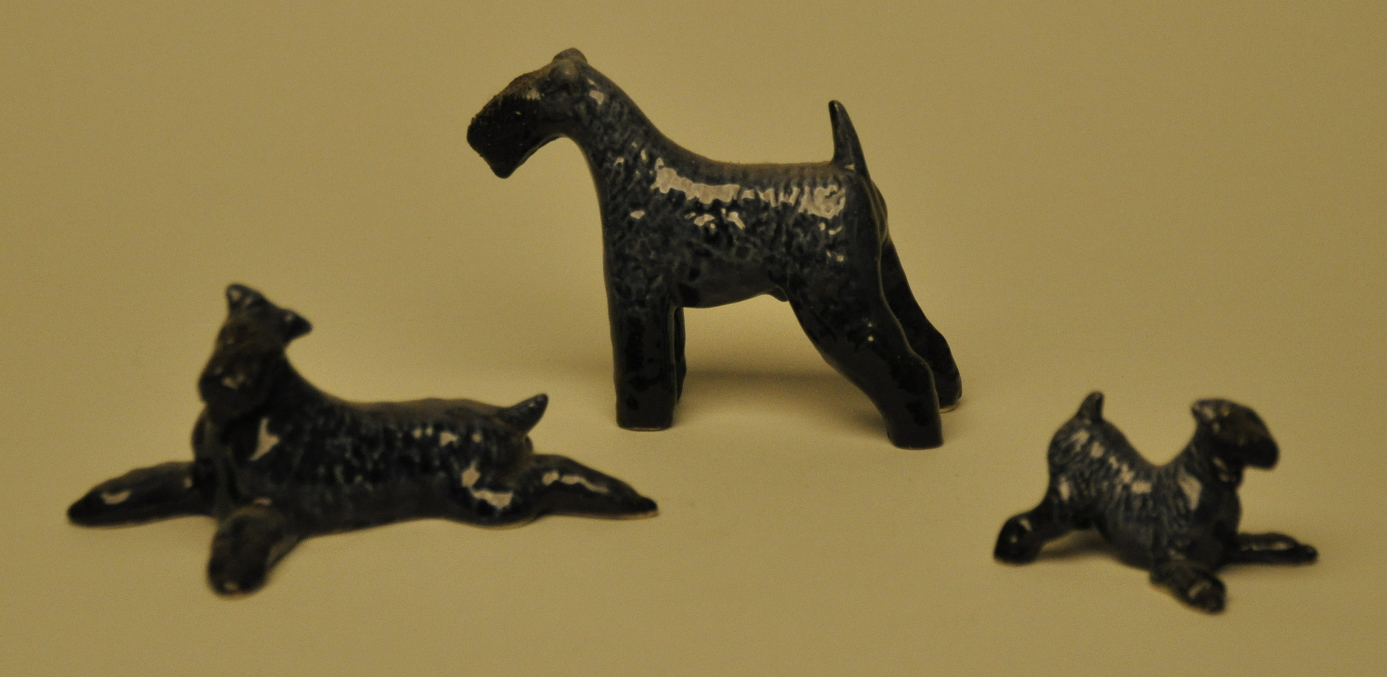
Hardie-Arnita dog figurines.

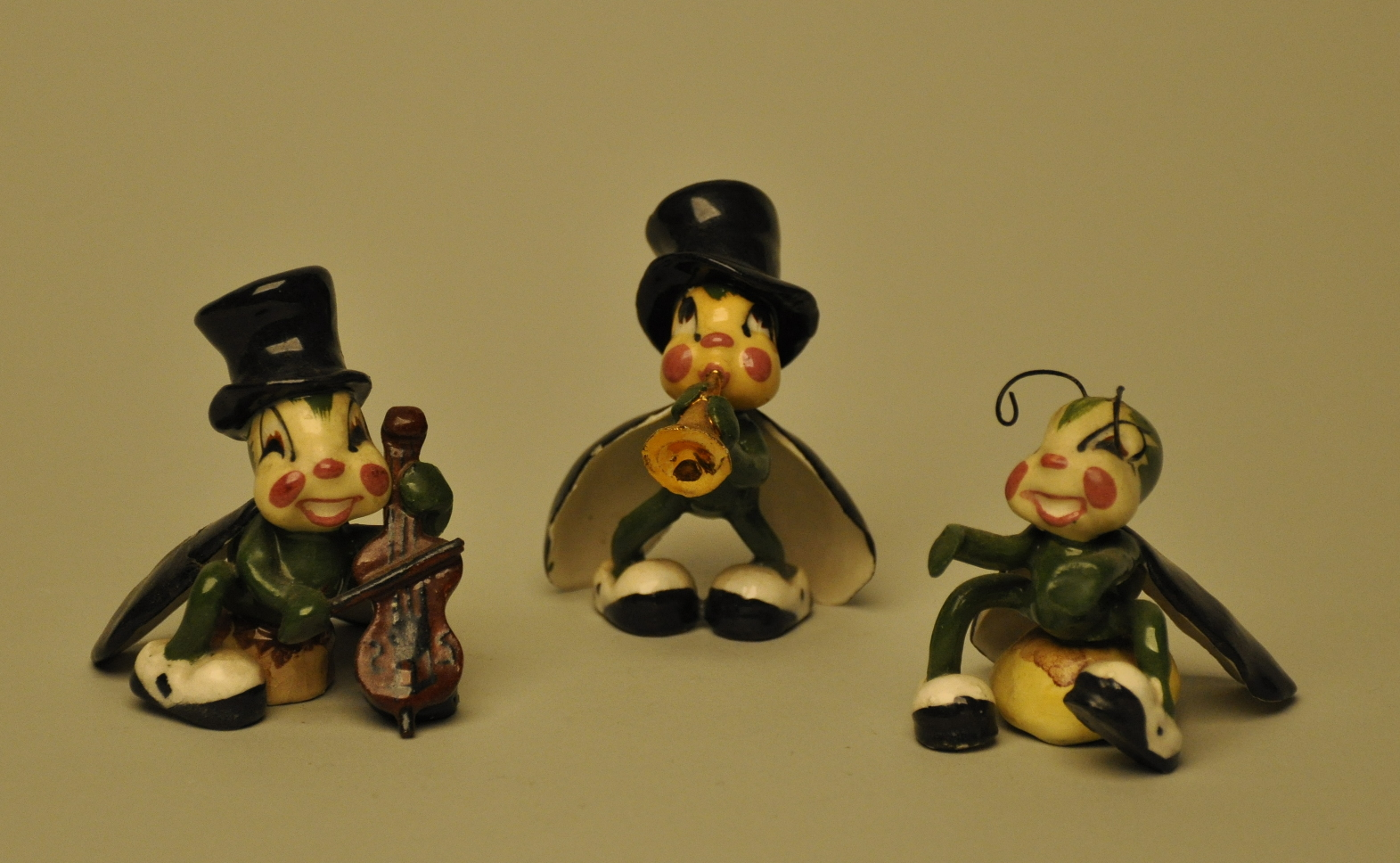
Beth Barton bug band figurines.

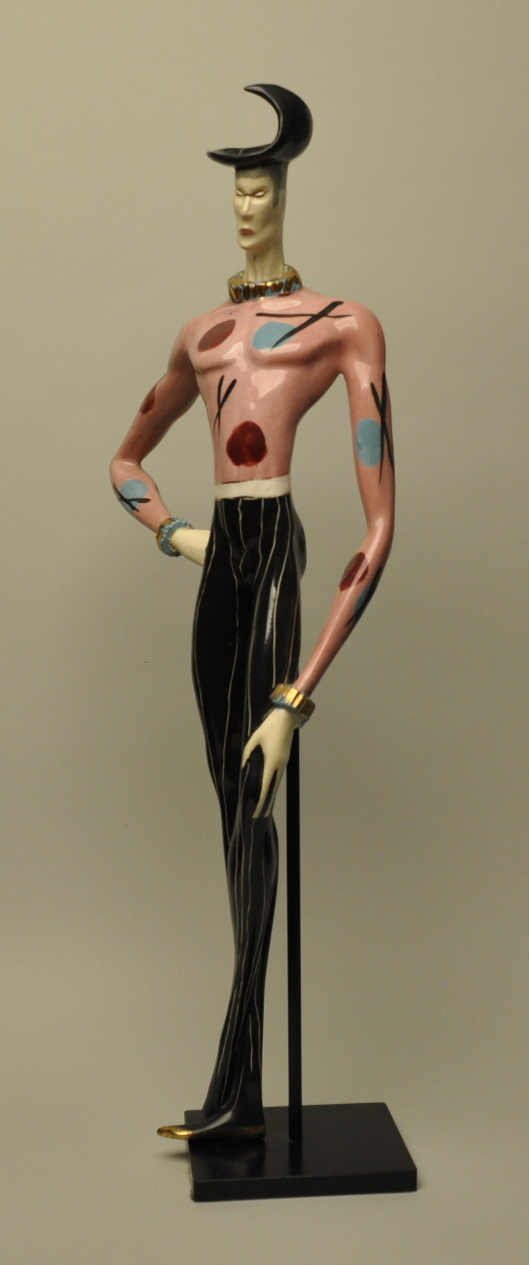
Marc Bellaire dancer figurine.

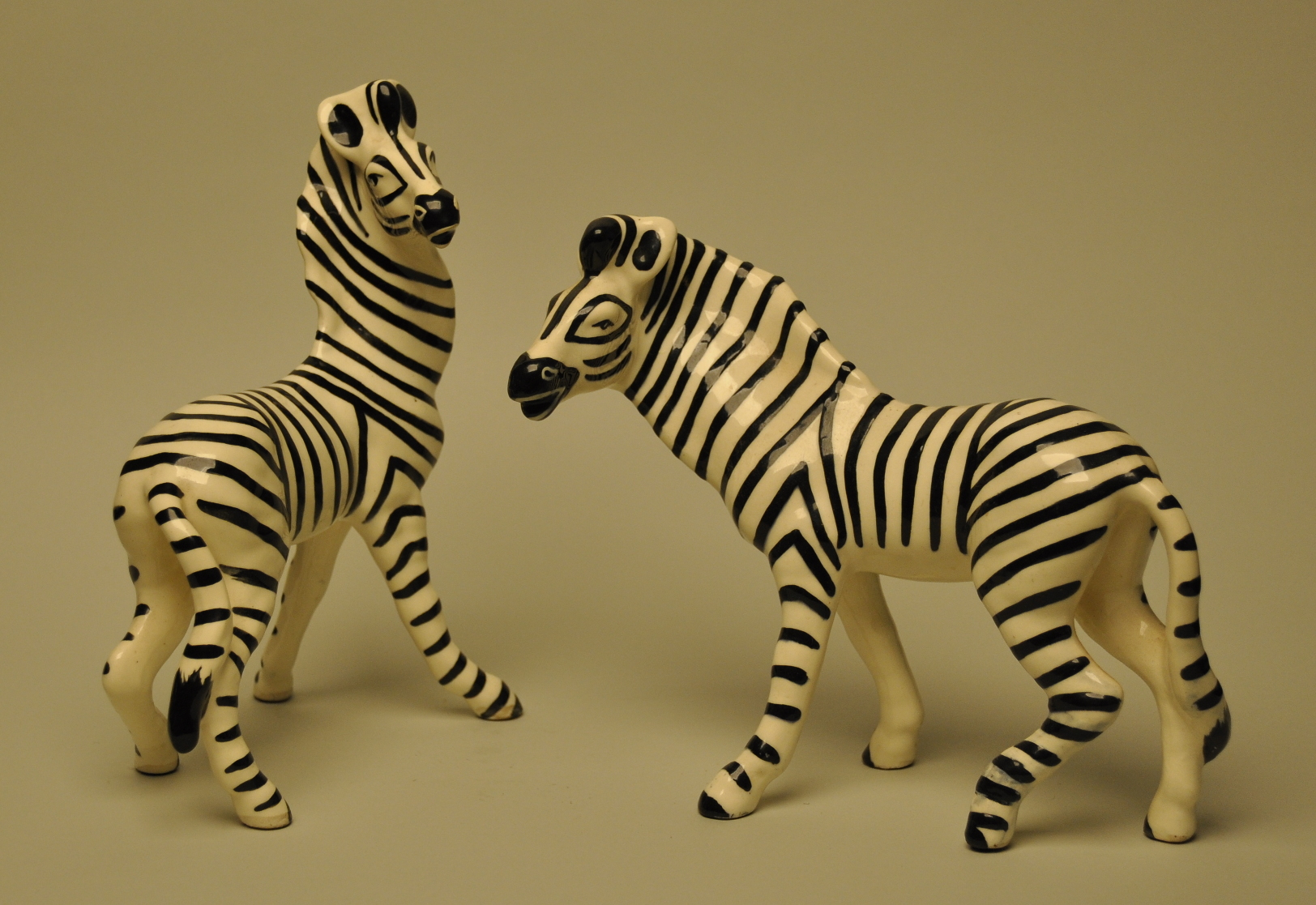
Robert Simmons zebra figurines.

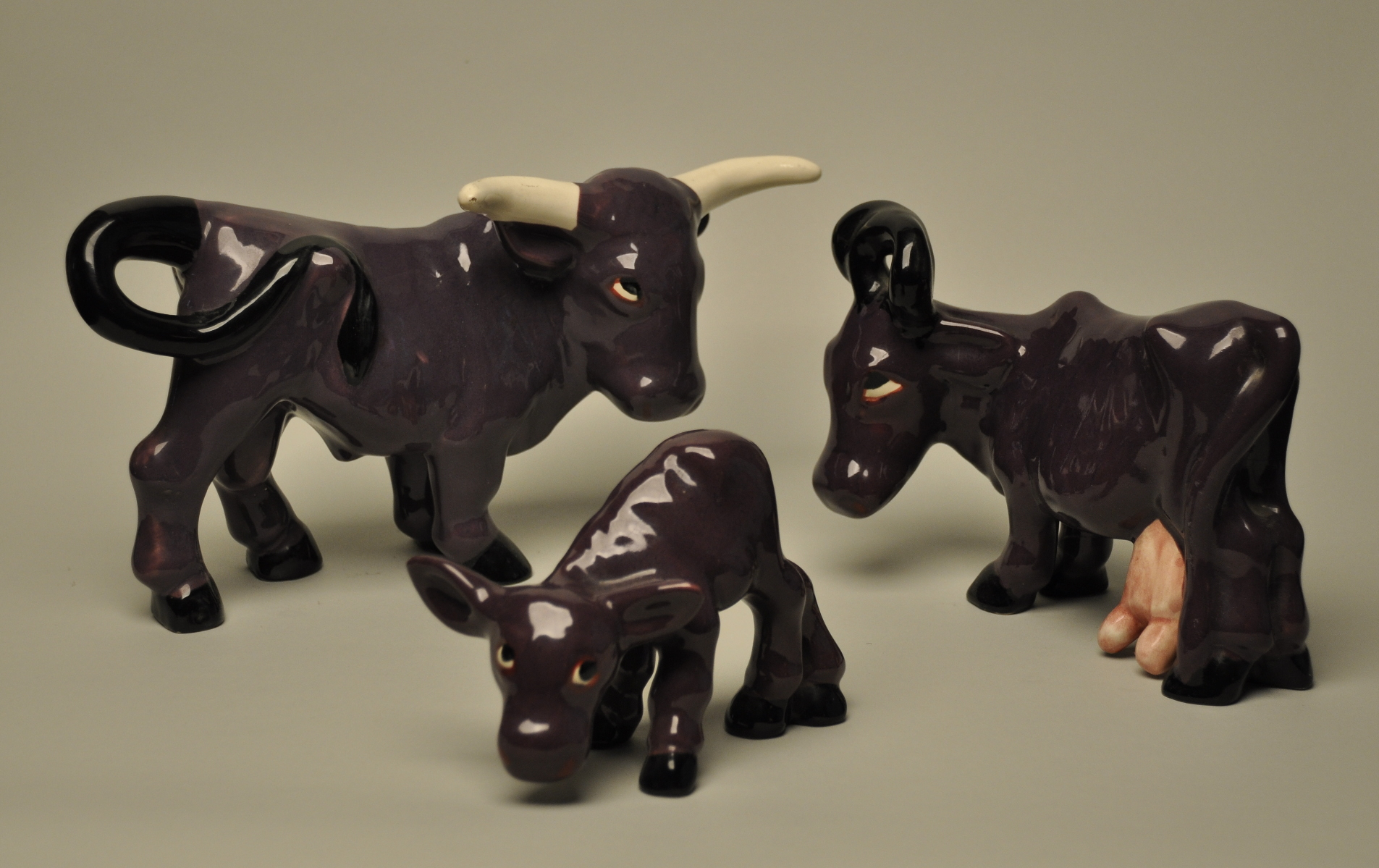
Brayton Laguna purple bull, cow, and calf figurines based on the poem Purple Cow by Gelett Burgess.

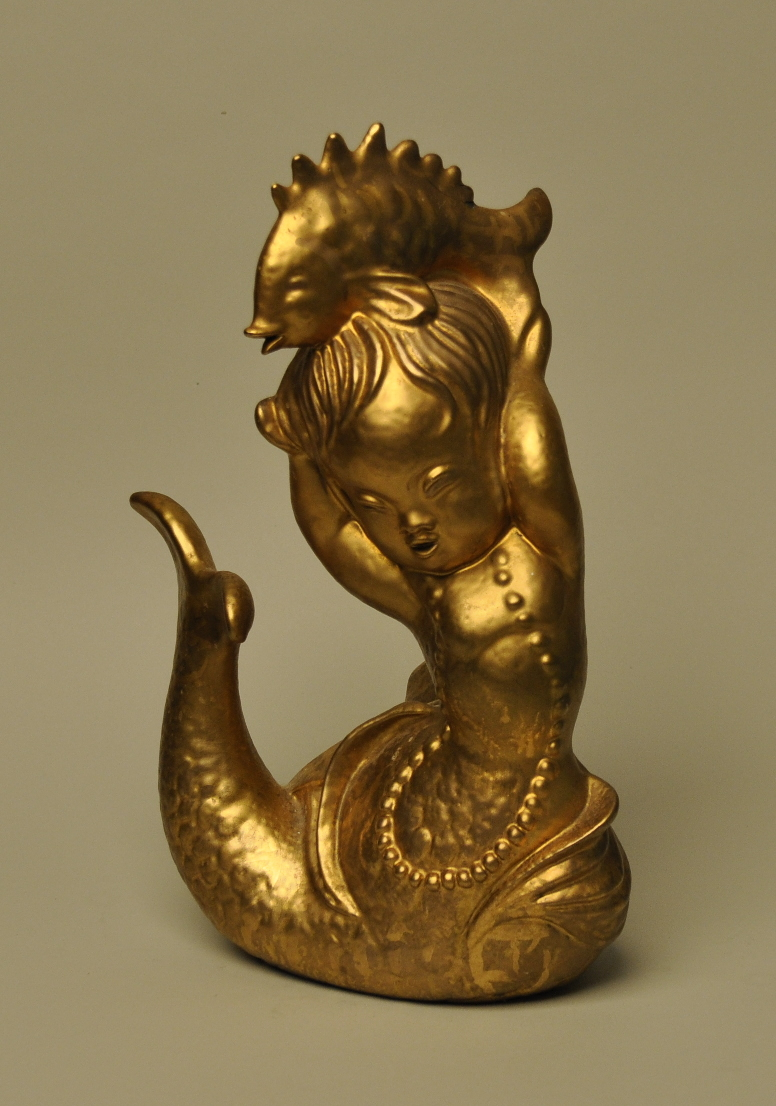
Sascha Brastoff Merbaby figurine.

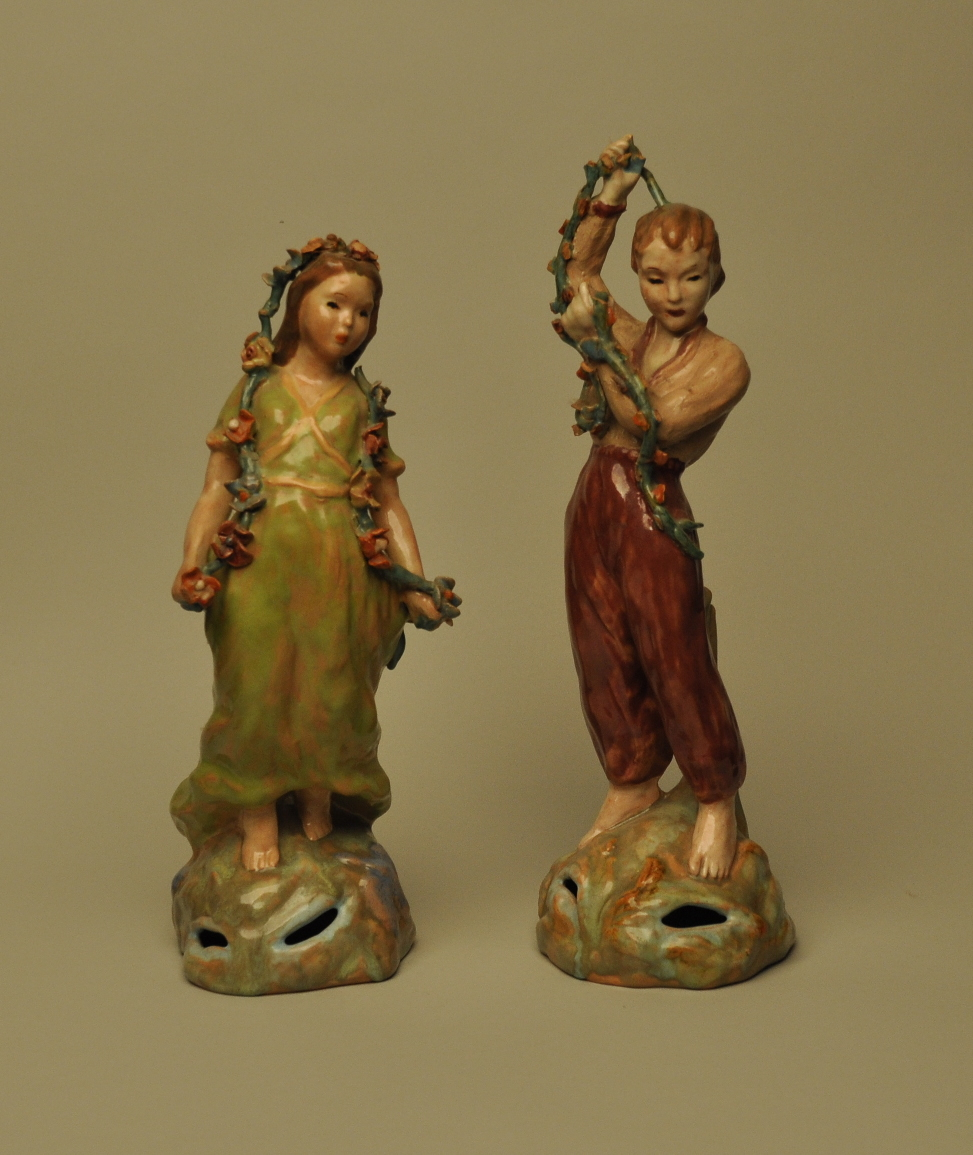
Joy Thompson spring and autumn figurines.

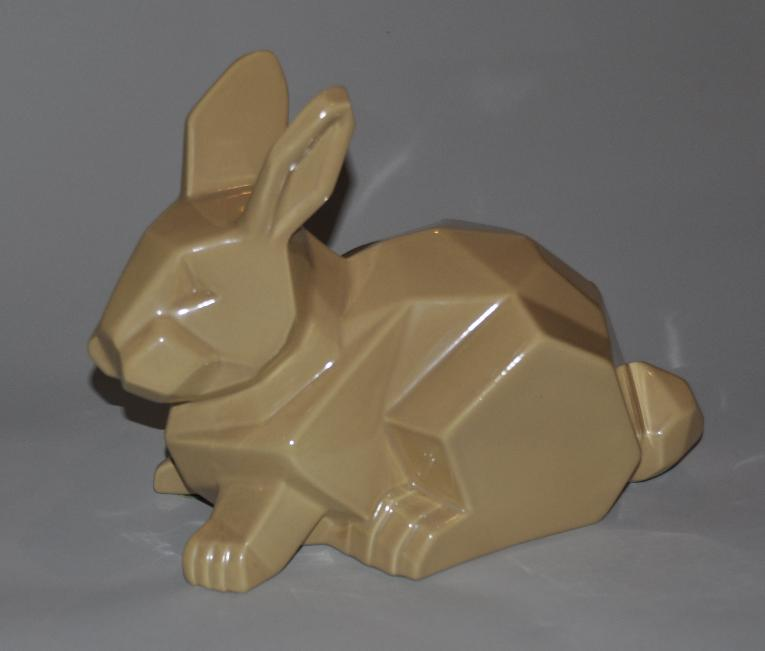
Jaru Art Products cubist rabbit.

=== Tableware ===
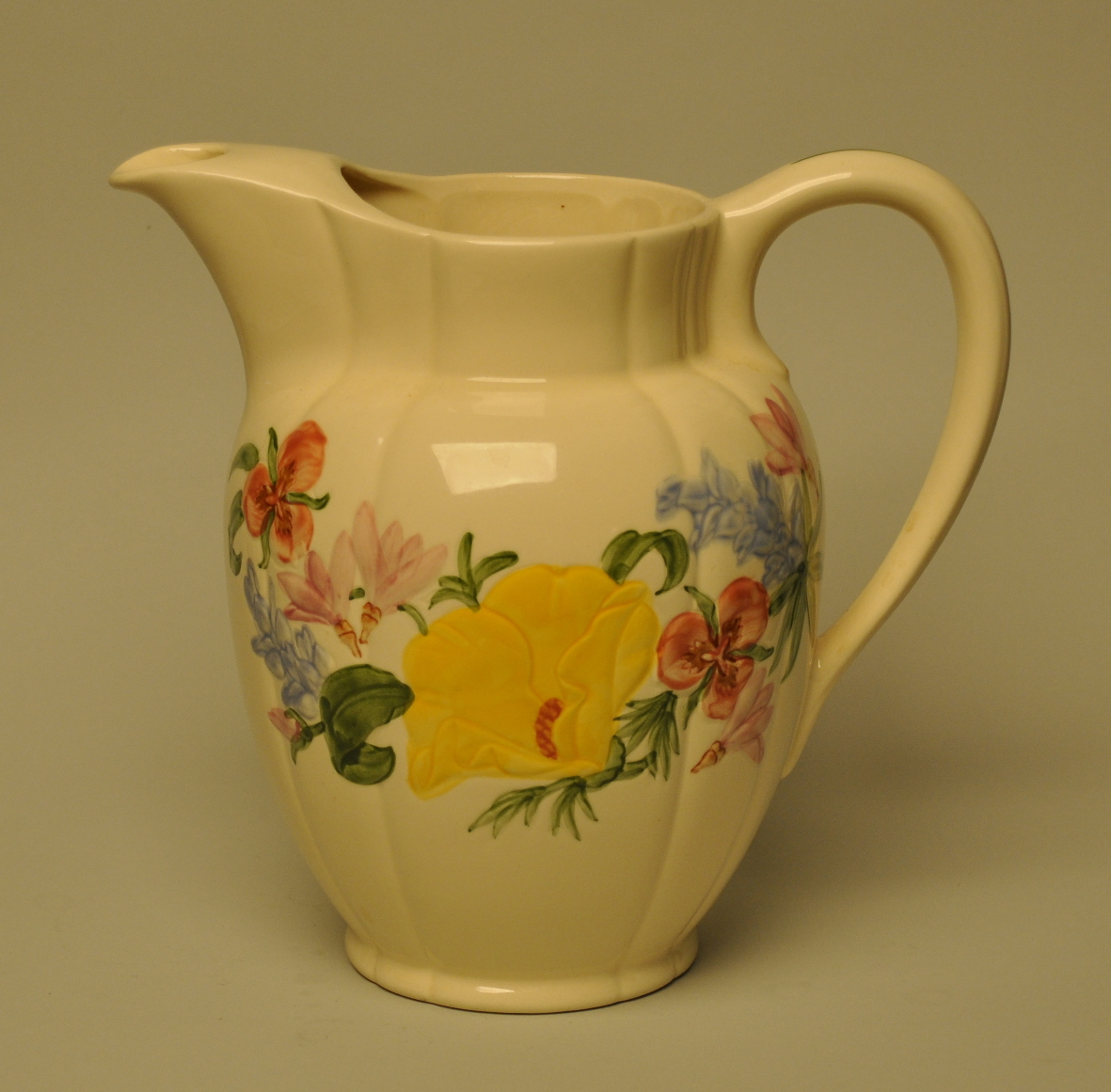
Gladding, McBean & Co. Franciscan ware Wild Flowers pattern pitcher.

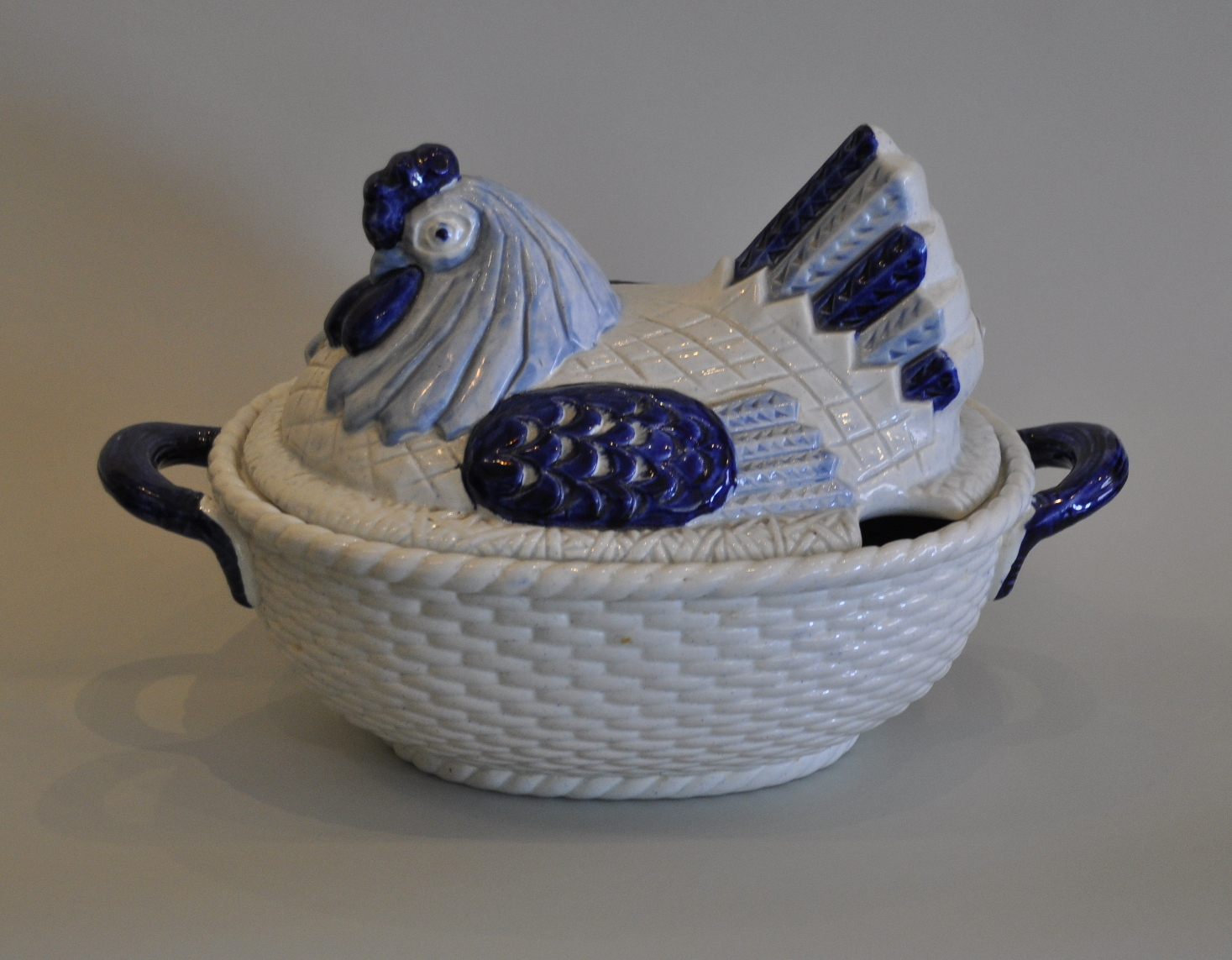
Metlox Poppytrail covered tureen.

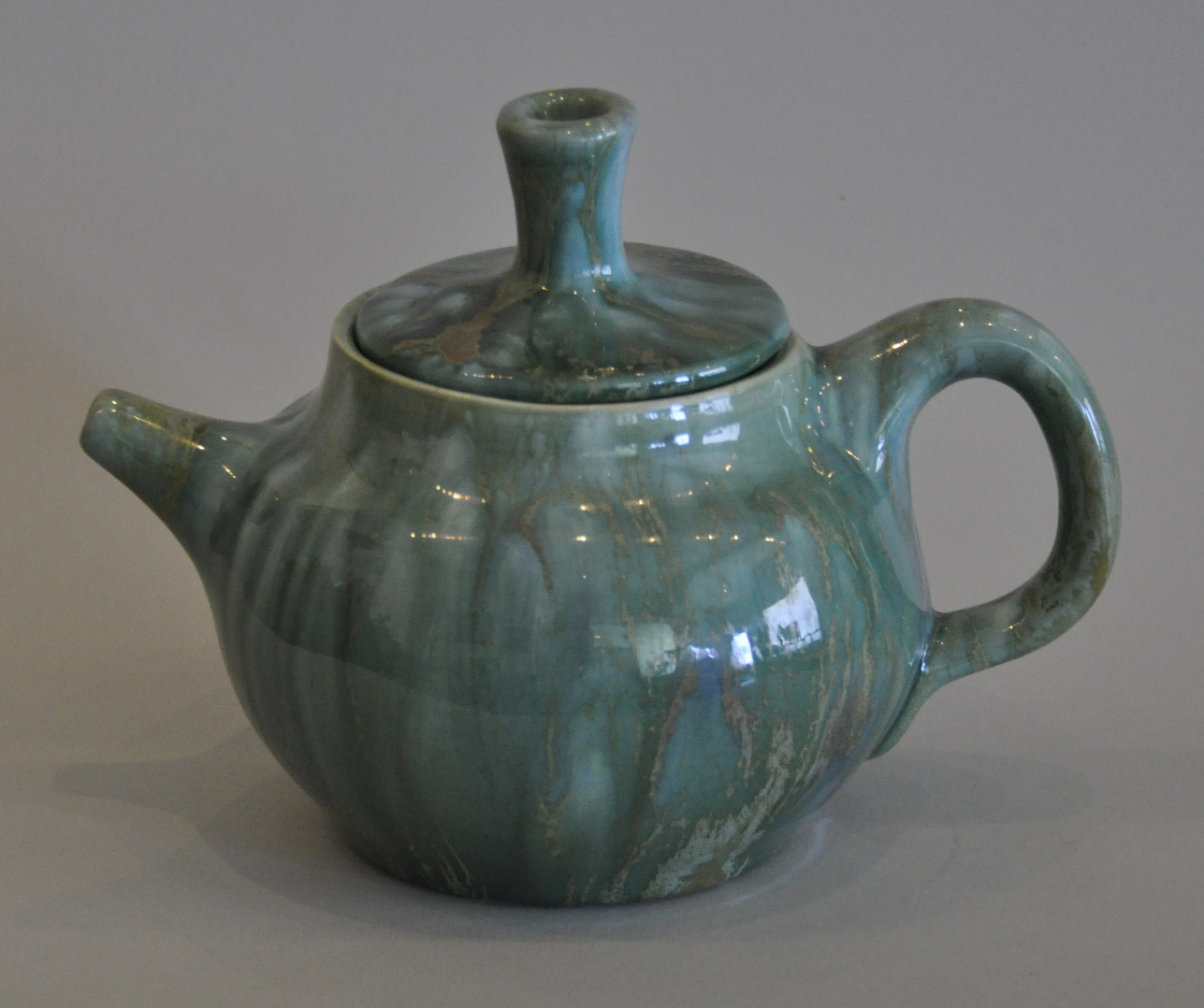
Monterey Jade teapot.

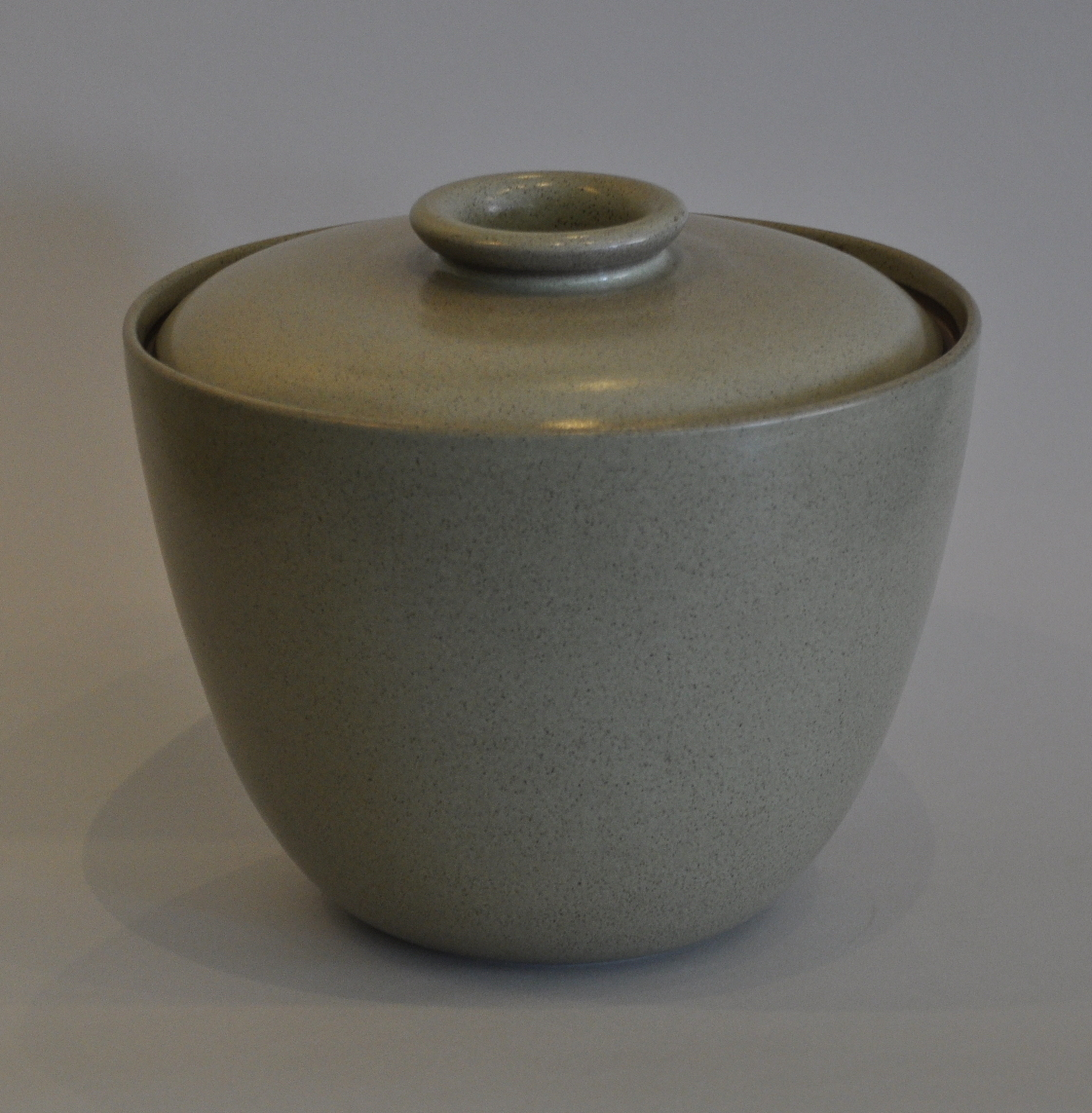
Heath Ceramics covered canister.

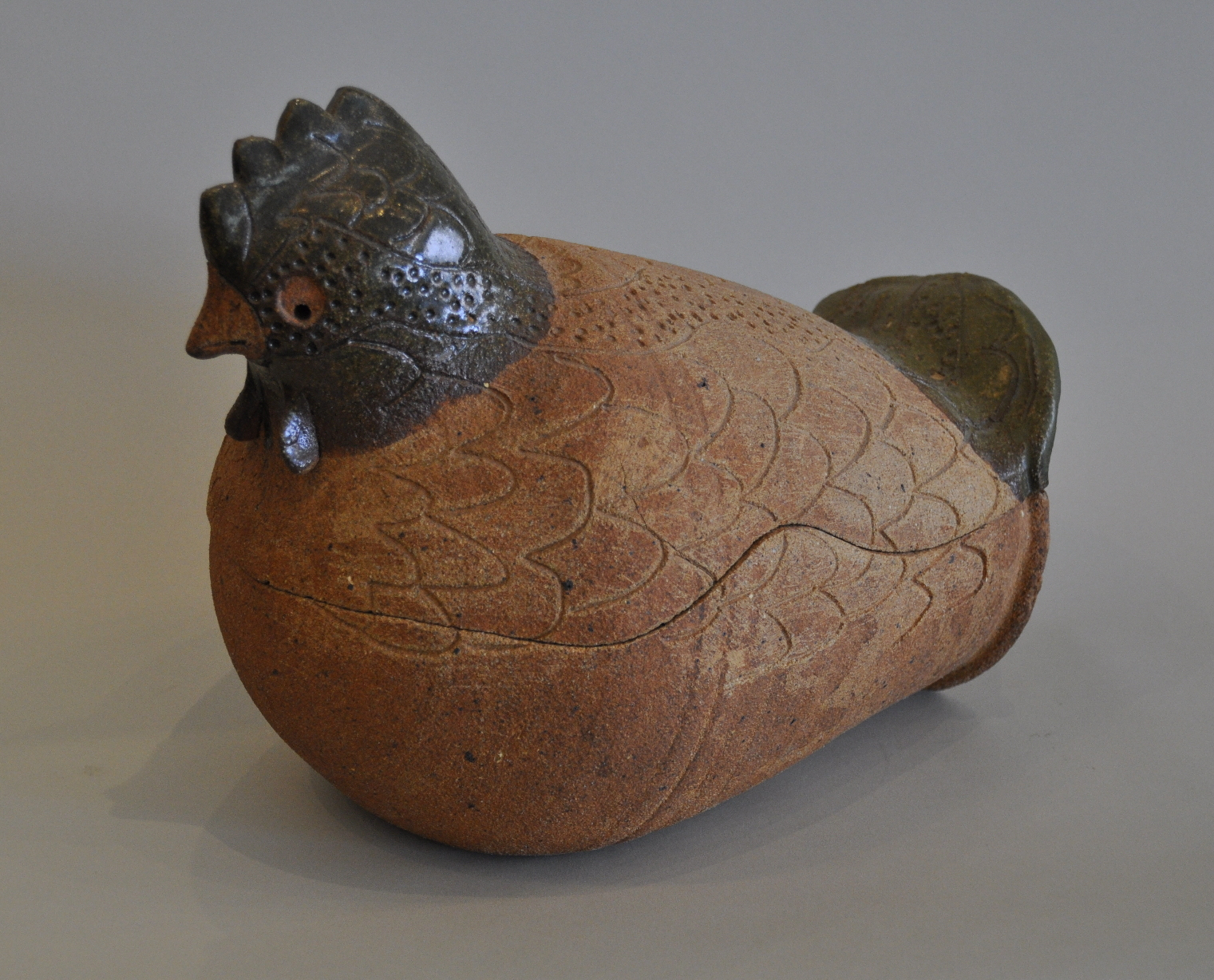
Environmental Ceramics chicken bakeware by Win Ng.
