= Garden City Pottery =

- Industry: Ceramic manufacturing
- Founded: 1902
- Defunct: 1987
- Fate: Dissolved
- Headquarters: San Jose, California, United States
- Products: Ceramic art ware and dinnerware

Garden City Pottery was founded in 1902 in San Jose, California, with an office and manufacturing facility on 560 North Sixth Street. Like many Californian potteries of that period, their original product lines focused on commercial tile and pipe, sanitary and gardenware products, and by the 1920s, Garden City was the largest pottery in Northern California.

== History ==
During the 1930s with demand for commercial and residential ceramics in dramatic decline due to the collapse of the real estate market, Garden City was on the verge of bankruptcy. Seeing the success of the Southern California potteries with their colored dinnerware lines, Garden City brought in a designer in the mid-1930s to create new products to compete with those potteries. The designer, Royal Arden Hickman, begin creating new dinnerware lines as well as floral and artware pieces.

In addition to bringing Hickman on board, Garden City recruited Paul Larkin from Pacific Pottery to create a series of glazes for the new lines. Merrill Cowman joined in 1934, and the two of them formulated Garden City's first set of glazes in yellow, green, blue, orange, cobalt, turquoise, black and white. Pottery was dipped in glazes rather than using a spray process.

Garden City produced five dinnerware patterns in the 1930s: Ring, Plain, Diamond, Swirl and Geometric. Compared to other dinnerware manufacturers, Garden City’s lines offered only a limited number of pieces: Most sets included a series of plates (6" bread and butter, 7" salad, 9" luncheon, 10" dinner and 12-14" serving plates) as well as a cup and saucer, bowl, creamer and sugar. Several lines included other serveware pieces, such as teapots, casseroles, pitchers and tumblers.

Among the more popular items that Garden City made are their nested mixing bowl sets. Mixing bowls came in five patterns with five or six bowls, depending on the pattern. The conical shaped mixing bowls are the most prevalent, and are often confused with Bauer Pottery's ringware mixing bowls. Vases and gardenware (flower pots, bowls, jardinieres) were also very popular during the period.

While their primary distribution was on the Pacific coast, Garden City wares were distributed nationally through retailers like Macy's and Montgomery Ward. Since Garden City was primarily a wholesaler, wares were sold under store brand names and are not marked. Additionally, no company product catalogs are known to exist and no official product names are known.

Hickman left Garden City in 1939 for the Haeger Pottery Company of Illinois, where he founded the very successful Royal Haeger artware lines. Post-1940, Garden City added new colors popular in the period: burgundy, forest green, mint green, pastel yellow, tan, pink and grey. Throughout the 1960s and 70s, the pottery changed its focus to creating redware products for the wholesale nursery industry, becoming the largest supplier of garden pots in California.

As cheaper products begin to be imported from Korea and Italy, as well as the emergence of plastic flower pots, Garden City found themselves unable to compete in that market. By 1979, the decided to exit the manufacturing business and focus solely on wholesale distribution. The new venture was not profitable and Garden City closed in 1987.
