= Sorcha Boru =

Sorcha Boru was the studio name of Claire Everett Stewart (née Jones; April 13, 1900 – January 30, 2006), an American potter and ceramic sculptor. Most of her works include small items such as figurines, vases, planters, and salt and pepper shakers, mostly done in the art deco style. One of her pieces includes an "Alice in Wonderland" chess set (1932).

Claire Everett Jones was born in San Francisco, California and graduated from the Girls High School in San Francisco in 1919. In 1924, she received a bachelor's degree in English from the University of California Berkeley. Around 1926, she married Ellsworth R. Stewart (1897–1971), whom she met while they were students at University of California, Berkeley.

From c. 1932-39, she had a studio at the Allied Arts Guild in Menlo Park, California. From about 1940 to the mid-1950s, she had a studio at 430 El Camino Real in San Carlos, California with a production factory nearby in San Carlos, operated by her husband who made pieces using molds. Her work has been exhibited at the Whitney Museum of American Art (1937), the San Francisco Museum of Modern Art (1935), the Golden Gate International Exposition (1939), the Syracuse (New York) Museum of Fine Arts, now the Everson Museum of Art (1936) and Northwestern University Museum of Art in Evanston, Illinois. Her works are held at the Everson Museum of Art, the Oakland Museum and at the Museum of History in San Carlos, California.

Sorcha Boru died in Woodbridge, California at the age of 105 on January 30, 2006.

== Sources ==
- The Potter's Art in California, 1885 to 1955 (1980), Hazel V. Bray
- Carlmont Enquirer-Bulletin, 21 July 1982, Russel Estep (article)
- Who's Who in American Art, 1985 (revised edition), Peter Hastings Falk
- Artists in California, 1786 - 1940, 2002, Eden Milton Hughes
- Museum of San Carlos History, San Carlos, California (exhibit)
- The New York Times, April 15, 1990, Harold C. Schonberg (antiques article)
