= Brayton Laguna Pottery =

American ceramics company

- Industry: Ceramic manufacturing
- Founded: 1927
- Founder: Durlin Brayton
- Defunct: 1968
- Fate: Dissolved
- Headquarters: Laguna Beach, California, United States
- Key people: Durlin Brayton; Webb Brayton
- Products: Ceramic art ware and dinnerware

Brayton Laguna Pottery produced ceramics (pottery) in Laguna Beach, California from 1927 to 1968.

== History ==
Durlin Brayton, a graduate of the Chicago Art Institute and self-employed carpenter, bought a kiln and built a small ceramics workshop out of his home in Laguna Beach, California around 1927. Alongside his wife, he produced a small set of dinnerware – place settings, teapots, pitchers and bowls – notable not only for the hand-pressed mold technique used in production, but for the wide range of innovative glaze colors. Brayton's color palette included rose, strawberry pink, eggplant, jade green, lettuce green, chartreuse, old gold, burnt orange, lemon yellow, silky black, and white. Brayton Laguna is considered to be one of the first California potteries to produce the solid color dinnerware lines later popularized by J. A. Bauer Pottery, Pacific Clay Products and others. In addition to the dinnerware line, Brayton also produced a range of decorative tiles, artware and vases. Brayton and his wife sold the pottery out of their home, attracting buyers by displaying wares in their front yard.

In 1936, Brayton married his second wife, Ellen Webster Grieve (known as "Webb"), and they began to transform the small workshop into a larger commercial enterprise. They constructed a new manufacturing facility on a five-acre plot of land in 1938, between the Pacific Coast Highway and Glenneyre Street. The completely modern new location featured two continuous tunnel kilns, essential for large-scale production, as well as design facilities and a showroom.

By the late 1930s, Brayton Laguna's focus was primarily on artware and hand-decorated figurines. At their highest capacity in the 1940s Brayton employed 150 artists, designers and potters. They became the first pottery company licensed by The Walt Disney Company to produce figurines based on Disney characters.

After World War II ended and tariff restrictions lifted, cheap imports from Europe and Japan began flooding the market. Adding to the economic problems faced by the company, Webb died in 1948 and Durlin died of a heart attack in 1951. Struggling with increased competition for the giftware market, changing consumer tastes and loss of leadership, business declined. The company closed their doors in 1968.
