= Jerome and Evelyn Ackerman =

American designers

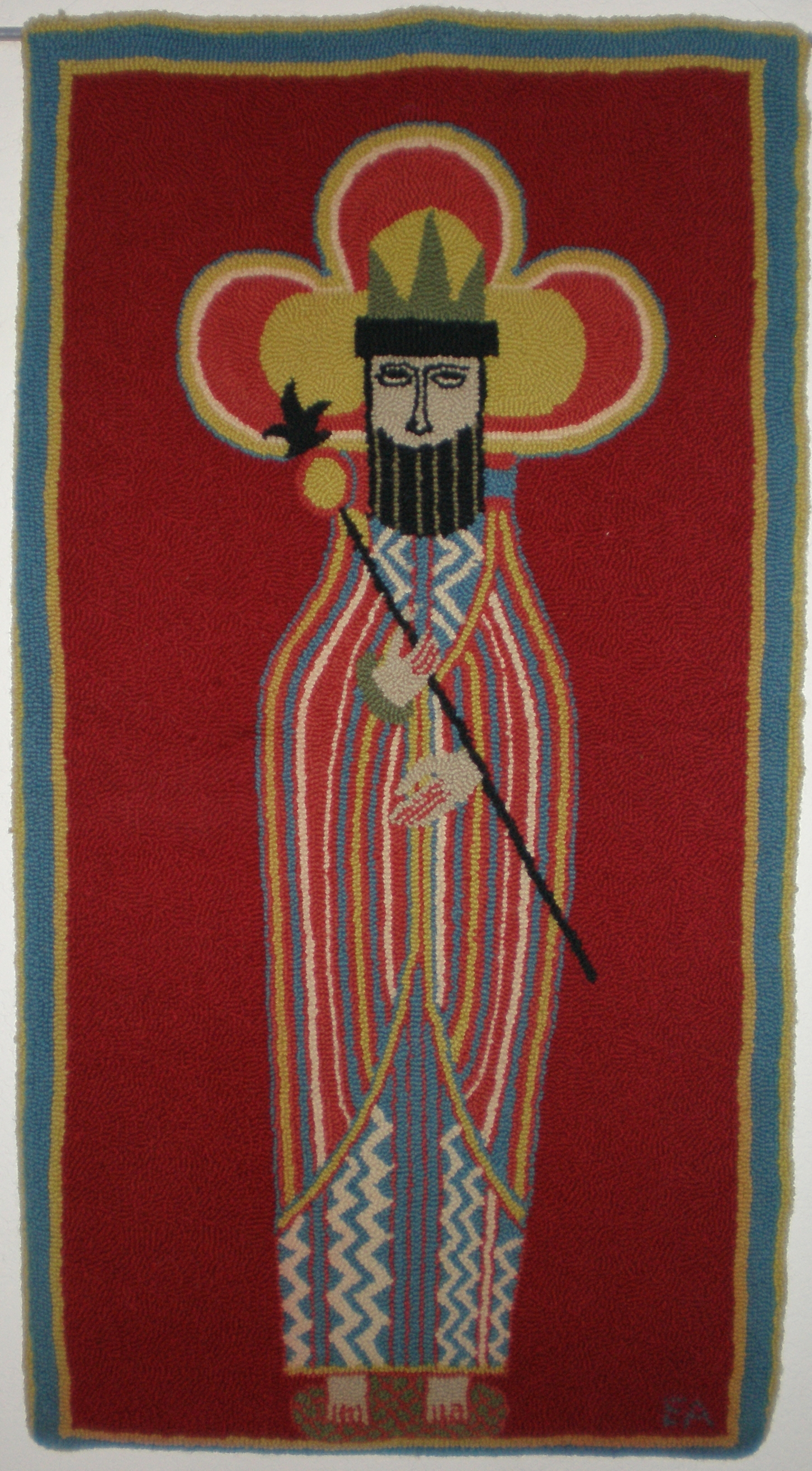
Jerome and Eveyln Ackerman hand-hooked tapestry rug

Jerome Ackerman (1920–2019) and Evelyn Ackerman (née Lipton) (1924–2012) were American industrial designers who jointly contributed to the aesthetic of California mid-century modern with their ceramics, wood carvings, mosaics, textiles, and enamels in home furnishings and architectural elements. The Ackermans sold their products through their companies Jenev and ERA Industries. Evelyn was an accomplished artist and an author of books on antique toys and dolls.

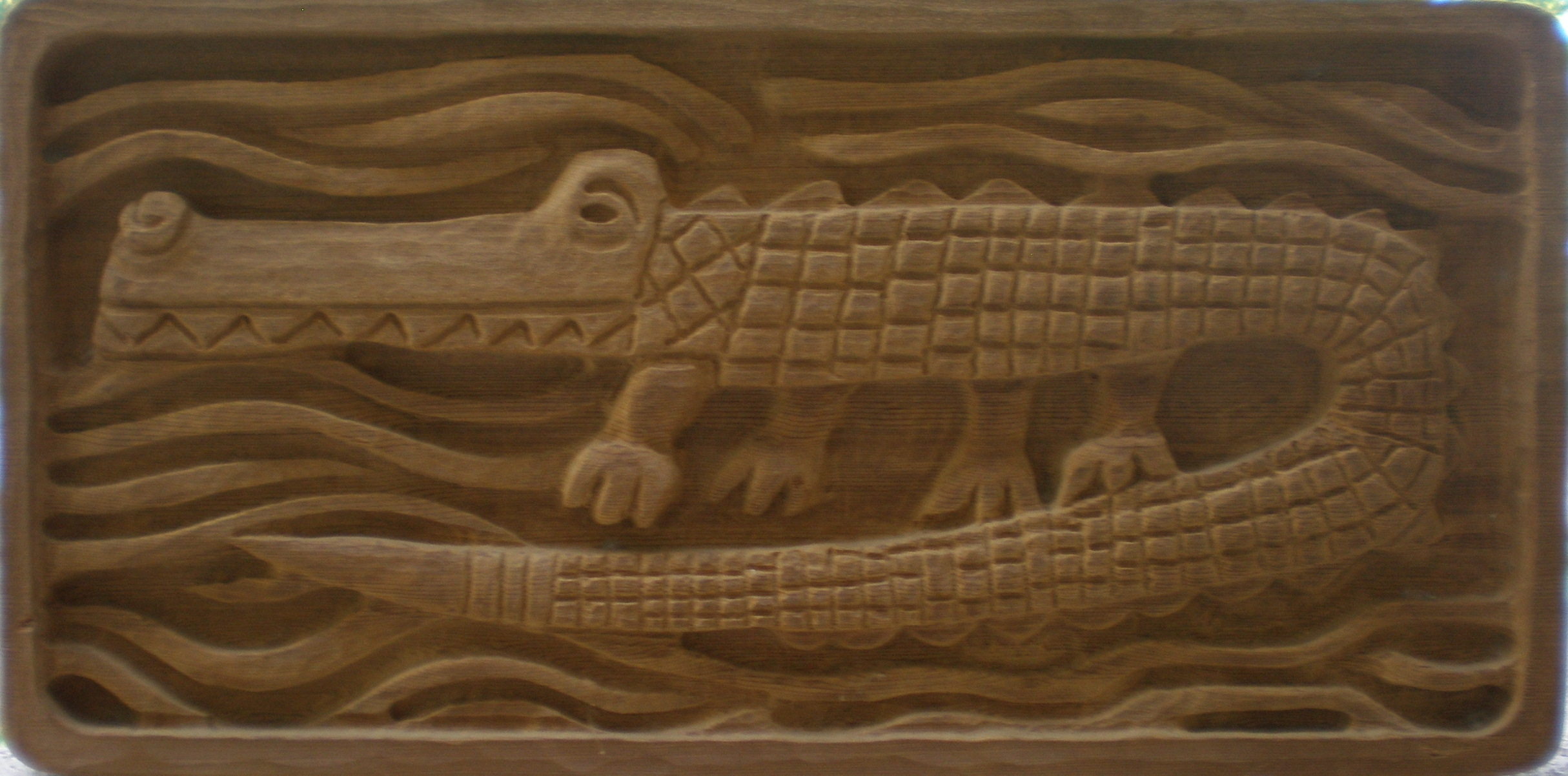
Alligator wood carved wall art designed by Evelyn Ackerman

== Jerome Ackerman ==
Jerome Ackerman was born on January 29, 1920, in Detroit to Louis Ackerman and Esther Greenberg. Jerry graduated from Detroit's Central High School in 1939 and enrolled at Wayne University (now Wayne State University) as an art major. In 1941, when the United States entered World War II, he left school to work in a naval ordnance plant and then joined the Air Force, serving as a control tower operator in Germany. In 1949, Jerry decided to complete his college education and returned to Wayne University under the GI bill.

Among the many art classes he took at Wayne was ceramics taught by John Foster, who emphasized Chinese pottery and the work of Hamada and Bernard Leach. During Jerry's senior year, Charles Harder, chairman of the New York State College of Ceramics at Alfred University, was the invited guest juror of the senior art exhibition at Wayne. Impressed by Jerry's work, he offered him a place in the Alfred graduate program. Jerry received his MFA degree in ceramics in June 1952.

As he reduced his time with ERA Industries, Jerry resumed his ceramic pursuits. While still a traditional studio potter, he introduced more whimsical, decorative elements into his hand-thrown pots. His studio pottery, comprising both functional pieces and sculptural forms, has appeared in gallery and museum exhibitions.

Jerry died on March 30, 2019, in Culver City, California, at the age of 99.

== Evelyn Ackerman ==
Evelyn Ackerman was born on January 12, 1924, in Detroit, Michigan to Jacob Lipchinsky (later changed to Lipton) and Sara Turetsky. Evelyn graduated from Central High School in 1941, and began at the University of Michigan as an art major. Then, in 1942, her father died and her three brothers entered the military. With her mother in need of help, she transferred to Wayne University as a fine arts and art history major. There she was introduced to the German Expressionists, Rembrandt, Cézanne, Klee, and Matisse by her art history professor, Dr. Ernst Scheyer. After completing her BFA degree with distinction in 1945, Evelyn completed her MFA degree in fine arts in 1950.

After retiring from ERA Industries, Evelyn spent a year and a half creating a 40-piece series of cloisonné enamels with silver wire on copper completing the project in 1979. The series Stories from the Bible was donated to the permanent collection of the Renwick Gallery, Smithsonian American Art Museum, Washington, D.C.

Over the years, Evelyn collected antique toys and dolls. She authored articles and published five books on antique dolls and toys. Her successful pattern books for dressing antique dolls, the first that were based on research and were authentic expressions of the dress of the period, were reissued. In the 1980s, she volunteered at the Los Angeles County Museum of Art of Art Costume and Textile department and wrote a monograph on nineteenth-century dress and an extensive glossary for a catalogue of eighteenth-century costumes and textiles.

Eveyln died in Culver City, California at age 88 in 2012.

== Personal life ==
Jerome and Evelyn were married on September 12, 1948. Shortly after marrying, Jerry and Evelyn visited his parents, who had moved to Los Angeles. While there, they met Beatrice Wood and Gertrud and Otto Natzler. They also met John Follis, who, with Rex Goode, designed a series of large-scale ceramic planters they sold to Max and Rita Lawrence, who formed architectural pottery.

As art students in 1949, Evelyn and Jerry found inspiration for a creative vision that changed their life and career. “For Modern Living,” an exhibition organized by Alexander Girard at the Detroit Institute of Arts, showcased the work of several innovative contemporary designers, including Ray and Charles Eames and George Nelson furniture, Kurt Versen lighting, and V'Soske carpets. “It opened our eyes to an exciting new way of thinking and design expression. "We thought, if the Eames can do it, why can’t we?” Jerry later recalled.

In 1952, the Ackermans moved to Los Angeles. In 1960, their daughter Laura was born.

== Jenev Design Studio ==
In 1952, renting a small space at 2207 Federal Avenue in West Los Angeles, the Ackermans opened Jenev Design Studio, a combination of their first names. With very little money, they set about building a successful career based on ingenuity, talent, and hard work. Jerry began creating his first group of slip cast pottery, using the skills he had honed at Alfred. Designing shapes, making molds, and developing glazes consumed nearly a year. Jenev's first client was Jules Seltzer, owner of a Los Angeles showroom for modernist furniture. During this same period, they also designed a number of products for Cal Pacific Imports.

As sales increased, the Jenev ceramics line was marketed nationally by independent sales representatives. It was also personally selected by Paul McCobb for sale in his Directional Showroom. Jerry and Evelyn's work began to appear in the “Home” section of the Los Angeles Times and House and Garden as well as other newspapers, home furnishing and interior design magazines, and trade journals. The Ackermans met and became friends with fellow members of the American Ceramic Society, including Peter Voulkos, Otto and Vivika Heino, Malcolm Leland, and Laura Andreson.

In 1955, intrigued by a mosaic in a San Francisco exhibition, Evelyn began designing mosaics for tables and wall panels. Many of the designs were featured in home and interior magazines, as well as in the “California Design” exhibitions. While Evelyn initially made all the prototypes, she and Jerry soon realized that she would not be able to keep up with demand. They established a mosaic workshop in Mexico so that Evelyn could focus solely on creating new designs and be assured of a steady supply of product.

== ERA Industries ==
In 1956, the Ackermans bought a three-bedroom Los Angeles tract house with a partially completed work studio. A design associate of architect A. Quincy Jones helped them complete the studio, and the couple began filling the space with hand-crafted objects including wood panels carved by Evelyn Ackerman. That same year Jerry reconnected with a high school classmate, Sherrill Broudy. Sharing a love of architecture and design, they decided to become business partners. Jenev became ERA Industries, the name the business retains to this day. After several years, the Ackermans bought Broudy out. With this transition, the couple began to apply their talents to a wider variety of media, designing home accessories and architectural elements in the form of textiles, wood, metal, and mosaic. They employed an innovative combination of traditional techniques and modern production approaches—Evelyn Ackerman focused on designing, while her husband managed the business side of their venture.

Always exploring new materials, Jerry and Evelyn became interested in several processes involving aluminum and created a number of special commissions. Warrior King was selected for the second “California Design” exhibition at the Pasadena Art Museum.

Evelyn had taken weaving in college and they decided to add woven tapestries to their product line. It soon became apparent that Evelyn alone could not meet the demand. They found a family of skilled weavers outside of Mexico City to execute the designs, working with the family for more than 25 years. Evelyn's first design, Hot Bird, featured on the cover of the Los Angeles Times “Home” section, was followed by a steady stream of new tapestries. Evelyn also designed a number of wall hangings that were silk-screened onto fabric.

The Ackermans decided it was time to have their own showroom for the architecture and design trade featuring their unique designs. They opened their first showroom in 1959 on Melrose Avenue and San Vicente Boulevard, across from where the Pacific Design Center is now located.

In 1964, when they outgrew their showroom on Melrose, they moved to larger quarters on Beverly Boulevard, across from the Herman Miller showroom. This location, in the heart of the design trade, offered premier exposure and better opportunities for dealing with architects and interior designers. In the following years, Jerry and Evelyn created designs individually and as a team as the business grew. At this juncture Jerry decided to concentrate on product design and development and marketing.

Contract furnishings and interior design represented a large market. Ackerman designs were featured at major department stores such as Bloomingdale's, Macy's, and Bullock's, as well as at established contemporary design stores across the country. To better serve these clients, the Ackermans decided to showcase the work of other artists and craftsmen and pursue more custom projects. At the same time, they realized the need to continually add new designs to each of their lines. One of the most popular lines was a group of hand-hooked wall hangings Evelyn designed that were produced in Japan.

The Ackermans’ knowledge of traditional craft techniques led them to utilize the handwork skills of craftsmen in Greece, Kashmir, Italy, Japan, and Mexico. By pursuing limited production runs, they were able to maintain high quality while keeping their products affordable. Detailed instructions, with full-size drawings and color keys, were sent for each new design. By adding new designs on a regular basis, they were able to maintain a fresh look in their lines.

While many of their artist-craftsmen peers became known for working in one medium and style, the Ackermans’ creative expression was multifaceted, broad, and diverse. Evelyn's versatile design styles ranged from geometric minimalism to biomorphic abstraction to whimsical stylization. She and Jerry were able to translate imagery from one medium to another. The same design could be made as a woven tapestry as well as reproduced in metal, mosaic, or wood to maximize both the development investment and the design's appeal. In order to accommodate homeowners’ differing tastes, Evelyn developed palettes for textiles and mosaics in both cool and warm color schemes.

Jerry adapted production techniques to create products that still had a handcrafted look. Woodcarvings, for example, were first roughed out using the furniture manufacturing technique of multiple spindle carving, then each piece was hand finished by a carver. Evelyn designed a series of modular carved wood panels with tongue-and-groove details for their former business partner, Sherrill Broudy, to be used in architectural applications. These panels formed the nucleus for Broudy's company Panelcarve (later Forms+Surfaces). One of Evelyn's most popular carved wood designs was the Ucello series.

Responding to a need for more well-designed, contemporary cabinet hardware, Jerry designed a new series. His hand-cast solid brass pulls and knobs were produced in Italy with a variety of inlays and finishes. They supplemented ERA's line of recessed plastic pulls with pulls produced in Denmark and designed by Count Sigvard Bernadotte.

From the beginning, much of the Ackermans’ work was special commissions. In 1968 Evelyn began the execution of 12 custom 6´ x 8´ needlepoint tapestries for the new Litton Industries corporate office in Beverly Hills. The tapestries were made in Greece using Evelyn's full-size drawings and specifications. The project took a year and a half to complete.

By the late 1980s, they decided to cut back on designing and manufacturing new products for ERA. Jerry represented several other lines of fine interior and architectural products and continued to work with the architects and interior designers with whom he had long-standing relationships. The Ackermans refocused their creative energies on individual projects, returning to their home studio.

== Awards ==
- Museum of California Design (MOCAD), Los Angeles. Henry Award for Jerome and Evelyn Ackerman's contributions to California design. (2008)

== Exhibitions ==
- Masters of Mid-Century California Modernism: Evelyn and Jerome Ackerman. Mingei International Museum, San Diego, California. (2010)
- A Marriage of Craft and Design: The Work of Evelyn and Jerome Ackerman. Craft and Folk Art Museum, Los Angeles. (2011)
- California Design, 1930–1965: "Living in a Modern Way." Los Angeles County Museum of Art, Los Angeles. (2011)
- Masters of Mid-Century California Design, The Story of Evelyn & Jerome Ackerman. Eisenhower Health Center, Palm Springs, California. (2015)
- Material Curiosity by Design: Evelyn & Jerome Ackerman. Craft Contemporary, Los Angeles. (2025)
