= Dora De Larios =

American ceramist and sculptor

- Born: 1933; Los Angeles
- Died: January 28, 2018 (aged 84–85); Culver City, CA
- Education: University of Southern California
- Known for: Ceramic art
- Website: doradelarios.com

Dora De Larios (1933 – January 28, 2018) was an American ceramist and sculptor working in Los Angeles. She was known for her work's clean lines and distinctive glazes, as well as for her line of tableware created under her family-run company Irving Place Studio. Also a muralist working with tile, De Larios was noted for her style, which reflects mythological and pan-cultural themes.

== Early life and education ==
Born in Los Angeles to Mexican immigrant parents, De Larios grew up in downtown Los Angeles near Silver Lake, where she was surrounded by Mexican and Nisei Japanese immigrants. This diverse community, as well as her childhood trips to the Museo Nacional de Antropología in Mexico City, inspired her to create artwork that blended influences from ancient American and Japanese ceramics. She studied with potters Otto and Vivika Heino and Susan Peterson at the University of Southern California. Her professors exposed her to the work of radical ceramic artists, notably Peter Voulkos, whose abstract work encouraged her to explore non-functional forms in clay. She graduated in 1957 with a major in ceramics and a minor in sculpture.

== Career ==
Upon graduation, De Larios set up an independent studio in Los Angeles and sold her work through venues that included Gump's in San Francisco. In her figural sculptures, she developed a distinct style that derived from traditional Japanese Haniwa. In the 1960s, artist and impresario Millard Sheets hired De Larios, along with other notable ceramists including Harrison McIntosh and Jerry Rothman, to design tiles for the Franciscan Ceramics division of Interpace in Los Angeles. Beginning in the late 1960s, she began experimenting with bronze, creating sculptures based on her personal experiences. Inspired by her participation in the Mask Festival at the Craft and Folk Art Museum, De Larios began experimenting with the mask form in the 1980s, drawing on religious and spiritual traditions from around the world. She has stated that she "loves working on large things" in public spaces: "I think that I can reach more people, and I think that part of what is for me is a healing process. It has always been enticing for me. It reaches you somewhere that has nothing to do with money. It replenishes the spirit. I like having my art in a public space because you never know who you're going to help." For the majority of her career, De Larios was not represented by galleries, instead selling her work through regular studio sales.

On January 28, 2018, Dora De Larios died in Culver City, California at the age of 84 after a four-year battle with ovarian cancer.

== Selected exhibitions ==
De Larios's work has been featured in a number of solo and group exhibitions across Southern California, including the M.O.A. Gallery in West Hollywood (1988 and 1990), Marsha Rodell Gallery in Brentwood (1982), Bakersfield College (1982) Anhalt Gallery in Los Angeles (1967, 1969 and 1974) and Zora Gallery in Los Angeles (1964).

In 2009, the Craft and Folk Art Museum hosted Sueños / Yume: Fifty Years of the Art of Dora De Larios a retrospective of De Larios's work, curated by Elaine Levin.

In 2011, she was prominently featured in Art Along the Hyphen: The Mexican-American Generation at Autry Museum of the American West. The same year, she was included in Common Ground, Ceramics in Southern California 1945–1975 at the American Museum of Ceramic Art. Both exhibitions were organized as part of the Getty Foundation's Pacific Standard Time: Art in L.A. initiative.

In 2017, two of De Larios's sculptures were included in the exhibition Found in Translation: Design in California and Mexico, 1915-1985 at the Los Angeles County Museum of Art. The exhibition highlighted the artist's deep connections to ancient Mexican art. That year, the artist donated her Goddess totems (2009) to the museum's permanent collection.

In 2018, the Main Museum in downtown Los Angeles organized a retrospective of her work, Dora De Larios: Other Worlds.

Craig Krull Gallery in Santa Monica organized exhibitions of her work in 2017 and 2019. The 2017 exhibition featured De Larios along with three other Mexican American artists, Gilbert Luján, Carlos Almarez, and Elsa Flores Almaraz. The 2019 exhibition The Studio is My Church featured paintings on paper from the last year of the artist's life, along with ceramic sculptures.

Her work, Opera Singer, was acquired by the Smithsonian American Art Museum as part of the Renwick Gallery's 50th Anniversary Campaign.

== Major commissions ==
In 1970–1971, De Larios created, as a lead artist through the Franciscan Ceramics division of Interpace, the Grand Canyon Concourse fourth floor lobby mural in the Disney World Contemporary Resort in Orlando. The 18,000 square foot mural, designed by Mary Blair, was executed on 12" square ceramic tiles.

In 1977, De Larios was one of fourteen artists commissioned to make a dinnerware set for the Senate Wives Luncheon at the White House. The series was later exhibited at the Smithsonian's Renwick Gallery.

Other public commissions include:

- Life Force in Laguna Beach, 2003
- Koi Goddesses at the Westin Bonaventure Hotel in Los Angeles, 1997
- Tree of Life in Culver City, 1997
- Homage to Quetzalcoatl at Villa-Park Community Center in Pasadena, 1992
- The Elements in Los Angeles, 1989
- The World According to Dora at the Hilton Anaheim, 1984
- Exterior murals for public libraries in Compton (1973), Lynwood (1977), Norwood (1977) and Rowland Heights (1978).
