= Regis Brodie =

American artist

Regis Brodie (1942–2024) was a tenured professor of art at the Department of Art and Art History at Skidmore College in Saratoga Springs, N.Y., and a potter. From 1972, he served as the Director of the Summer Six Art Program at Skidmore College. He also wrote a book called The Energy-Efficient Potter, which was published by Watson-Guptill Publications in 1982. He started the Brodie Company in 1999 in the interest of developing tools that would aid potters at the potter's wheel.

== Biography ==
Brodie was born in 1942 in Pittsburgh, Pennsylvania. He received a Bachelor of Science degree in Art Education at Indiana University of Pennsylvania in 1965, a Master of Art Education from Indiana University of Pennsylvania in 1966, and a Master of Fine Arts from Tyler School of Art of Temple University in 1969. He joined the faculty of Skidmore College soon afterward, retiring in 2010 after 40 years. He had eight grandchildren: Mackenzie, Tyler, Dylan, Sydney, Mason, Avery, Skyler, and Madison. He died on October 10, 2024, surrounded by his family in Saratoga Springs.

== Publications ==
=== Books ===
- The Energy-Efficient Potter by Regis C. Brodie. Book, Watson-Guptill Publications, 1982.

=== Articles ===
- The Studio Potter, June 1997, Article, "Re-firing a Second Chance”, Vol. 25, #2
- Ceramics Monthly, May 1994, Article, "The Creative Process", pp. 5, 31-33.
- Ceramic Scope, 1993, Volume 30, # 1, Article, "Kilns: The Potter's Fire", pp. 12–18
- The Studio Potter, June 1988, pp. 55–56, "Close Encounters with the Third Dimension: Making College Resources Available."
- The Studio Potter, December 1986, pp. 39–40 & 48 Article "Multi-Firing: Another Way."
- NCECA Journal, 1984, Volume 5, Article, "Efficiency in Kiln Building and Firing", pp. 59–61 (National Council on Education for the Ceramic Arts)
- The Studio Potter, June 1984, Article, "Ceramic Fiber 1984," pp. 33–41.
- Ceramics Monthly, March 1984, Article, "Fiber Insulating a Salt Kiln," pp. 67–71.
- Ceramics Monthly, September 1983, Article, "Ceramic Fiber 1984," pp. 38–40.

=== Contributing author ===
- "Studio Practices, Techniques and Tips" Edited by Anderson Turner, A Collection of Articles from Ceramics Monthly, Updated Article on Insulating Existing Kilns, by Regis C. Brodie, pp. 101–103, Published by The American Ceramic Society, Westerville, Ohio, 2003
- "Ceramics, Mastering the Craft”, by Richard Zakin. A section on multi-firing with step-by-step photos and text, pp. 238–241. Chitton Book Co, Radnor, PA, 1990.

=== Work included in books or periodicals ===
- Revista Ceramica (National Ceramics Magazine of Spain), Issue No. 86, 2003,”Regis Brodie- A Vision Defined”, by Roberta Griffith, Madrid, Spain, pp 78– 81, (six color & 7 black & white images)
- "Working With Clay" 2nd ed., by Susan Peterson, Prentice Hall, London, UK, 2002 p. 127
- "Make it in Clay: A Beginner's Guide to Ceramics," 2nd Edition by Charlotte F. Speight & John Toki, Mayfield Publishing Company, 2001, pp. 129 & 143, color plate p. 27.
- "Ceramics: Mastering the Craft," 2nd edition, Krause Publications, Iola, WI, by Richard Zakin, 2001, pp. 107 & 159
- "The Contemporary Potter," Rockport Publishers, Gloucester, MA, Fall 2000, pp 130 & 146,
- "Working With Clay," by Susan Peterson, Prentice Hall, Upper Saddle River, NJ, 1999 p. 103.
- "The Best of Pottery 2," selected by Angela Fina & Chris Gustin, Quarry Books, MA, 1998 p. 70, and cover
- "Make it in Clay: A Beginner's Guide to Ceramics," by Charlotte F. Speight & John Toki, Mayfield Publishing Company, 1997, pp. 111 & 123, color plate p. 24.
- "The Best of Pottery," selected by J. Fairbanks and Angela Fina, Quarry Books, Rockport, MA, 1996, p. 81.
- "The Electric Kiln Ceramics," 2nd ed., by Richard Zakin, Chilton Book Co., Randor, PA, 1994, pp. 195 & 213.
- "The Craft and Art of Clay," by Susan Peterson, Prentice Hall, Englewood Cliffs, NJ, 1991, pp. 59, 330, & 361.
- "Ceramics, Mastering the Craft," by Richard Zakin. Chilton Book Co. Radnor, PA, 1990, p. 240.
- American Ceramics: The Collection of the Everson Museum of Art," edited by Barbara Perry, Rizzoli International Publications, Inc., New York, NY, 1989, pp. 216–217.
- Revista Ceramica, Issue No. 28, Page 63, and Revista Ceramica, Issue No. 21, Page 52
- Revista Ceramica, Issue No. 16, 1983, "Regis Brodie," by Barry Targan, pp. 40–47 (18 photographs).
- The Studio Potter, Volume 12, #1, Dec. 1983, "Hudson Valley Potters," article & photos, pp. 2–4.
- Funk and Wagnalls Encyclopedia, 1976 through 1982 editions, (Image Illustrating Contemporary Porcelain)
- "Porcelain: Traditions and New Visions," J. Axel & K. McCready, P. 91. Watson-Guptill Publications, 1981.
- "Salt-Glazed Ceramics," Jack Troy, Watson-Guptill Publications, 1977, New York, New York
- "Getting Into Pots," George and Nancy Wettlaufer, Prentice Hall, Inc., 1976, pp. 86,137 & 159.
- "Clay Work, Form and Idea in Ceramic Design," Leon Nigrosh, David Publications, Inc., 1975.

== Art in permanent collections ==
=== International ===
- Escuela de Arte Francisco Alcantara, (National School of Ceramics), Madrid, Spain
- World Ceramic Exposition Foundation, Icheon, Korea (Outdoor Installation)
- Musee National de la Ceramique, (National Ceramics Museum of France), Sèvres, France
- National Museums and Galleries of Wales, National Museum & Gallery, Cathays Park, Cardiff, Wales
- The Potteries Museum and Art Gallery, (National Museum of England), Stoke-on-Trent, England, UK
- University of Wales Institute, Center for Art & Design Education. Cyncoed Campus, Cardiff, Wales, UK
- Embassy of the United States of America, Cairo, Egypt
- The Regional Museum of Art, Tula, Russia
- Mori Hospital Collection of Art, Hakodate, Japan

=== National ===
- Everson Museum of Art, Syracuse, New York
- Delaware Art Museum, Wilmington, Delaware
- Albany Institute of History & Art, Albany, New York
- Utah Museum of Fine Arts, University of Utah, Salt Lake City, Utah
- The Hyde Collection, Glens Falls, New York
- Schenectady Museum, Schenectady, New York
- Long Beach Museum of Art, Long Beach, California
- Tang Teaching Museum and Gallery, Skidmore College, Saratoga Springs, New York
- Indiana University of Pennsylvania, Indiana, Pennsylvania
- Nelson Museum of Art, Arizona State University, Tempe, Arizona
- Tyler School of Art, Temple University, Philadelphia, Pennsylvania
- Southern Connecticut State University, New Haven, Connecticut
- Roberson Center for Art & Sciences, Binghamton, New York
- Hoffman-LaRoche Pharmaceutical, Nutley, New Jersey
- Verizon Corporation, White Plains, New York
- Lehigh-Portland Cement Company, Allentown, Pennsylvania
- Avon Products, Inc., World Headquarters, New York, New York
- General Electric Company, Schenectady, New York
- United States Steel, "Laurel Ridge", Corporate Home Site, Ligonier, Pennsylvania

== Juried and invitational exhibits ==
- "Gestural Currents", Isadore Gallery, Lancaster, Pennsylvania
- "2006 Collectors Show", Invitational Exhibition, Arkansas Arts Center, Little Rock, Arkansas
- "Third International Biennale- 2005", World Ceramic Exposition Foundation, Icheon, Korea
- SOFA New York, 2003, 2004 The International Exposition of Sculpture Objects & Functional Art, NY
- Symmetry Gallery, One-Person Show, Saratoga Springs, NY, 1995, 1997, 1999, 2001, 2003 & 2005
- "Vessel Invitational 2002: Contemporary Clay", Roberts Wesleyan College, Rochester, NY
- "Earth, Fire, and Fiber", Invitational Exhibition, Kirkland Art Center, Clinton, New York, 2002
- "A Gathering of Peers" Invitational Exhibition, The Clay Studio, Philadelphia, PA, 2002
- Invitational Porcelain Exhibition, in conjunction with "20th Century Porcelain from Sevres", American Craft Museum, New York, New York, 2001
- SOFA Chicago, 2000, The International Exposition of Sculpture Objects & Functional Art, Illinois
- "American Masters-Artists from Santa Fe Clay Workshop Program, 1994-1999”, Santa Fe, New Mexico
- "Winter Solstice-Contemporary Traditions", Albany Inst. of History and Art, NY, 1999
- The Hyde Collection, One-Person Show, The Rotunda Gallery, Glens Falls, New York, 1998
- "Inter-D2", International Craft Exhibition, McAllen, Texas
- "Recent Work- Regis Brodie", Manchester Craftsmen's Guild, Pittsburgh, PA, 1998
- College of New Rochelle, College Center Gallery, Two-Person Show, New Rochelle, NY, 1990
- The Munson-Williams-Proctor Institute School of Art, Utica, NY, One-Person Show, 1990
- Allentown Art Museum, Allentown, Pennsylvania, One Person Show, 1976
- Everson Museum of Art, Robineau Gallery, Two-Person Show, Syracuse, New York, 1976
- National Juried Exhibition, " Teapots", Arrowmont School of Arts and Crafts, Gatlinburg, Tennessee
- The 12th Northeast Fine Crafts Exhibit, (FIRST PRIZE & ARTIST AWARD)
- The 14th NE Fine Crafts (FIRST PRIZE), The Schenectady Museum, Schenectady, New York
- "Soup Tureens", Traveling Invitational Exhibition to: American Craft Museum, New York, New York, Ohio State University, Columbus Ohio, Cranbrook Academy of Art, Bloomfield Hills, MI and Illinois State University, Normal, Illinois
- "Ancient Inspirations/Contemporary Interpretations", Traveling Exhibition to: Parsons School of Design, NY, NY, Alfred University, Alfred, New York, Mississippi Museum of Art, Jackson, MS, Roberson Center, Binghamton, New York, Craft and Folk Art Museum, Los Angeles, CA
- "Containers As Form", Traveling Exhibition (sponsored by the Gallery Association of New York) to: SUNY Cortland, New York, Saint Lawrence University, NY, Pace University, New York, SUNY Buffalo, New York, SUNY Brockport, NY, SUNY Fredonia, New York, Alfred University, New York
- "Golden Years: Tyler's 50th Anniversary Celebration", Tyler School of Art Alumni invitational, Temple University, Philadelphia, Pennsylvania
- " Teapots", National Juried Exhibition, Arrowmont School of Arts and Crafts, Gatlinburg, Tennessee
- National Biennial Art Exhibition, Western Colorado Ctr. for the Arts, Grand Junction, Colorado
- National Invitational Exhibition, "Functional Ceramics," Wooster Museum, Wooster, Ohio
- National Juried Competition, "Tradition in the Making," Georgia State University, Atlanta

== Awards (teaching) ==
- New York State Art Teachers Association, "Special Citation 2005 Award",(in the field of Art Education in New York State)
- 2004 & 2005 Residency Program, International Symposium on Outdoor Ceramic Sculpture, World Ceramic Exposition Foundation, Yeoju, Korea
- "Visiting Fellow", University of Wales Institute, Center for Art and Design Ed, Cardiff, UK, May, 2001
- "The Ella Vandyke Tuthill Endowed Chair in Studio Art", Skidmore College (First recipient- 1993-1999)
- "The Edwin M. Moseley Faculty Research Lecturer", Skidmore College - 1988 (highest honor the faculty can confer on one of its members)
