= Harrison McIntosh =

American ceramicist

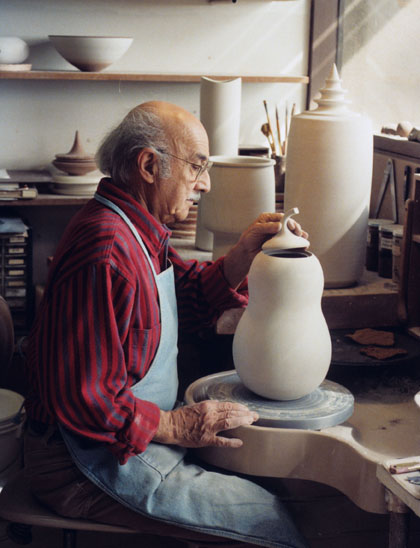
- McIntosh in his studio, 1992
- Born: Harrison Edward McIntosh; September 11, 1914; Vallejo, California, U.S.
- Died: January 21, 2016 (aged 101); Claremont, California, U.S.
- Education: Claremont Graduate School

Harrison Edward McIntosh (11 September 1914 – 21 January 2016) was an American ceramic artist. He was an exponent of the Mid-century Modern style of ceramics, featuring simple symmetrical forms. His work has been exhibited in venues in the United States including the Smithsonian and internationally including at the Louvre in France.

== Biography ==
=== Early years ===
Harrison Edward McIntosh was born in Vallejo, California to Harrison McIntosh, a ragtime piano player, and Jesusita (née Coronado) McIntosh.

McIntosh grew up in Stockton, California, where his father worked for Sperry Flour Company. At the time, the city of Stockton was building the Haggin Museum, which first inspired McIntosh's interest in the arts and architecture.

In high school, McIntosh and his younger brother, Robert, took informal painting lessons with Arthur Haddock. Both McIntosh brothers continued to pursue art after high school; Robert as a painter and Harrison as sculptor.

Two years after McIntosh graduated in 1933, he became a camp artist at a Civilian Conservation Corps camp in Yosemite, while his brother Robert received a scholarship to attend Art Center School, now Art Center College of Design in Pasadena, California. In 1937, after almost two years as a camp artist with the CCC, McIntosh moved down to Los Angeles and took classes at Art Center for six months.

McIntosh began working at the Foundation of Western Art in 1938, where he would work in the mornings as a gallery attendant and assistant. He would also work on commissions for Gustav Gilbert, owner of the arts material store The Louvre, making hand-carved picture frames for his store. At Harrison's suggestion, his parents hired Richard Neutra to build their new home. McIntosh assisted Neutra with the design and building; in the process, he learned design principles and incorporated a workshop space into the garage. These years marked McIntosh's first exposure to many of the famous California painters at the time, including Millard Sheets, as well as influential early ceramicists such as Gertrud and Otto Natzler.

=== Education ===
McIntosh attended the 1939 World's Fair in San Francisco where he first saw hand-thrown pottery demonstrations in the Japanese Pavilion. This experience inspired him to take classes in the medium with Glen Lukens at the University of Southern California.

After a few classes, McIntosh began to work on a turning wheel meant for carving cast works in his studio, where he would often experiment with layered glazes. These early experimental pieces typically were sold for a few dollars. In 1942, McIntosh married fellow artist Mary Stanfield. The next year, he, his brother, and ceramicist Albert Henry King put together a small gallery space on Sunset Strip called The Californians. With the United States' involvement in World War II, however, these plans came to a halt as he was drafted into the army as a medic in Northern California. During this time, McIntosh's wife became critically ill, and he was discharged to care for her. After six years of marriage, Stanfield died.

In 1948, McIntosh used the GI Bill to study ceramics in the MFA program through the Claremont Graduate School directed by Millard Sheets. There, he studied ceramics under Richard Petterson at Scripps College, in addition to attending workshops with Bernard Leach at Mills College, with Shōji Hamada the Japanese ceramicist during his US tour, and with Marguerite Wildenhain at Pond Farm during the summer of 1953.

McIntosh met his second wife, Marguerite Loyau, in one of Petterson's classes at Scripps College. Loyau was visiting from France on a Fulbright Fellowship through the Teacher Exchange Program to teach French at Pomona College. They married in 1952 and two years later gave birth to their daughter, Catherine McIntosh. Marguerite became her husband's business manager, often collaborating with him on design projects and organizing exhibitions of his work.

During his time at CGU, McIntosh became friends with fellow student and ceramicist Rupert Deese, with whom he opened a studio on Foothill Boulevard in Claremont, California. McIntosh and Deese worked together as business partners and friends for the next 50 years, first in the Foothill Boulevard space from 1950 to 1958, and then in a studio at Padua Hills until 2006. In addition to his lasting relationship with Deese, McIntosh was also close with many other Claremont artists such as Jim Hueter, Karl Benjamin, and Sam Maloof.

=== Career ===
For various intervals between 1956 and 1959, McIntosh taught at the Los Angeles Country Art Institute, now the Otis College of Art and Design, where he became friends with fellow teacher Peter Voulkos. Here he met Paul Soldner, John Mason, and Kenneth Price, who, with Voulkos, were translating the budding Abstract Expressionist movement into their work with clay. While he deeply respected their work, McIntosh found that he was not satisfied by working in this direction: "I was more interested in working with a medium I enjoyed and making things that other people enjoyed". He soon left the teaching position to pursue his studio work full-time.

In the first two decades of his career, McIntosh sold his work at various home-furnishing stores such as Bullocks Wilshire, Van Kepple Green in Beverly Hills, Kurt Wagner's in Redondo Beach and Abacus in Pasadena. Although he preferred to work in his studio, McIntosh accepted a number of mass manufacturing jobs throughout his life. McIntosh was hired as an employee at Metlox Manufacturing Company designing giftware prototypes from 1955 to 1956 and at Interpace International Pipe and Ceramics Corporation designing tiles from 1964 to 1966. From 1970 to 1980, McIntosh and his wife travelled to Japan during the summers to jointly design dinnerware and glassware collections for Mikasa. McIntosh was represented by Louis Newman Galleries in Beverly Hills through the 1980s, where he had a solo show almost every year until the gallery's close in 1992. He was then represented by Santa Monica-based Frank Lloyd Gallery in the 1990s.

In 1992, McIntosh developed glaucoma and macular degeneration; nonetheless, the ceramicist continued to work in his studio until 2006, at the age of 91. On January 21, 2016, at the age of 101, McIntosh died.

Over his more than 60-year career, McIntosh had 43 solo exhibitions. He is represented in over 40 art collections globally.

== Style and technique ==
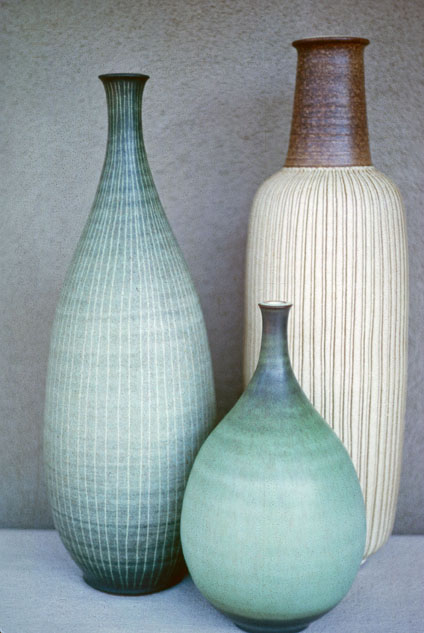
Group of hand-thrown vases, made by McIntosh in 1962.

McIntosh style remained consistent throughout his career, inspired by Japanese pottery and aesthetics, as well as European modern design. Although many of his contemporaries were known for creating the large emotional works associated with Abstract Expressionism, McIntosh focused on subtlety and deliberation through the modern, functional forms of vessels.

McIntosh was particularly renown for decorating his pots with "thin sgrafitto lines or rhythmic brush spots" made by placing contrasting slip onto the surface of his works with Japanese brushes and sponges. His often used the mishima technique, a process in which engobe is brushed into thin incised lines in the work. The quality of these brushstrokes and lines, however, changed over the course of his career. While the decoration of his early pieces have a regularity and rhythm, over time they gained dynamism as McIntosh explored line-work that expressed movement.

=== Abstract sculpture ===
Throughout his career, McIntosh expressed an interest in ceramic pieces that appeared weightless as if floating in space. His early vases often balanced on a small trimmed foot to create such an effect. In 1968, McIntosh began exploring abstract sculptural forms, the first of which, Blue Egg, was showcased in the 1969 traveling exhibition Objects:USA. His first abstract pieces were an elaboration on his vessel form, where spherical shapes without a base appeared to float above wooden bases. As he continued working on these sculptural pieces, he incorporated chrome-plated steel into his works as bases and angled planes. The placement of these steel walls create a mirrored surface that emphasize the appearance of the ceramic form being suspended in space, much like planets. Later works developed these ideas in subtle ways; McIntosh moved away from ovoid forms and began using more complex shapes while maintaining a reference to cosmic forms.

== Awards ==
- 1988 Elected Fellow of The American Craft Council, New York, NY
- 1999 Oral History, National Archives of American Art, Smithsonian Institution, Washington, D.C.

== Collections ==
- Renwick Gallery, Smithsonian Museum, Washington, D.C.
- Musée des Arts Décoratifs, Paris, France
- The National Museum of Art, Tokyo, Japan
- Museum of Fine Arts, Boston, Massachusetts
- Mingei International Museum, San Diego, California
- Los Angeles County Museum of Art, Los Angeles, California
- The Huntington Library, San Marino, California
- American Museum of Ceramic Art, Pomona, California
- Sam and Alfreda Maloof Foundation, Alta Loma, California

== Notable exhibitions ==
- 1950–1968 Everson Museum, Syracuse, NY Ceramic National Exhibition
- 1953–1971 Pasadena Museum of California Art, Pasadena, CA California Design
- 1953–1971 University of Illinois, Urbana, IL American Craftsman
- 1955 Cannes, France First International Ceramic Festival
- 1955–1969 Scripps College, Claremont, CA Ceramic Annual
- 1956 Museum of Contemporary Crafts, New York, NY Craftsmanship in a Changing World
- 1958 Los Angeles County Museum of Art, Los Angeles, CA Craftsmanship
- 1959 Ostend, Belgium Second International Ceramic Festival
- 1964–1965 Philadelphia Museum College of Art, Philadelphia, PA Craftsmanship Defined, 12 American Craftsmen
- 1969 The Johnson Collection of Contemporary Crafts, Smithsonian Institution, Washington DC Objects:USA
- 1969 Craft and Folk Art Museum, Los Angeles, CA The Egg and the Eye
- 1975 Everson Museum and Alfred University, Syracuse and Alfred, NY Masters in Ceramic Art
- 1979 Tokyo, Kyushu and Nagoya, Japan Ikenobo Exhibition of World Ceramic Art
- 1979–1987 Louis Newman Galleries, Beverly Hills, CA
- 1980 Smithsonian American Art Museum, Renwick Gallery, Washington DC A Century of Ceramics in The United States, 1878-1978
- 1980 Nagoya, Tokyo, and Kanazawa, Japan 8th Chunichi International Exhibition of Ceramic Arts
- 1980 Los Angeles County Museum of Art, CA Southern California Ceramics: The Post-World War II Renaissance 1940-1960
- 1986 Mingei International Museum, La Jolla, CA Two Hundred and Ten Years without End, Early American and Contemporary Arts of the People
- 1990 Museum of Fine Arts, Boston, MA Collecting American Decorative Arts and Sculpture, 1971-1991
- 1992–1993 Smithsonian American Art Museum, Renwick Gallery, Washington DC American Crafts: The Nation's Collection
- 1993 Mingei International Museum, San Diego, CA Heirlooms of the Future, Master Works of the West Coast American Designer/Craftsmen
- 1993 Metropolitan Museum, Tokyo, Japan 33rd Japan Contemporary Arts and Crafts Exhibition
- 1996 Tobey Moss Gallery, Los Angeles, CA Four Friends: Rupert Deese, James Hueter, Sam Maloof, & Harrison McIntosh
- 1996 Frank Lloyd Gallery, Los Angeles, CA California History I: Laura Andreson, Glen Luckens, Harrison McIntosh, Gertrude & Otto Natzler
- 1997 Long Beach Museum of Art, Long Beach, CA Function and Narrative: Fifty Years of Southern California Ceramics
- 2000 Los Angeles County Museum of Art, Los Angeles, CA Color and Fire, Defining Moments in Studio Ceramics 1950-2000
- 2000 Los Angeles County Museum of Art, Los Angeles, CA Made in California: Image, and Identity, 1900-2000
- 2001 San Francisco Museum of Modern Art, San Francisco, CA California Pottery, From Mission to Modernism
- 2005 Frank Lloyd Gallery, Los Angeles, CA Group Show: Tony Marsh, Karen Thuesen Masaro, Harrison McIntosh
- 2014 American Museum of Ceramic Art, Pomona, CA HM100

== Video and film ==
- The Ceramic Art of Harrison McIntosh: A Personal View of the Artist. McIntosh Productions, 1994.
- Video Interview of Harrison McIntosh. Los Angeles Museum of Contemporary Art, 2012.
- Harrison McIntosh Exhibit at AMOCA. KCET SoCal Connected, 2014.
