= Rupert Deese =

American ceramic artist

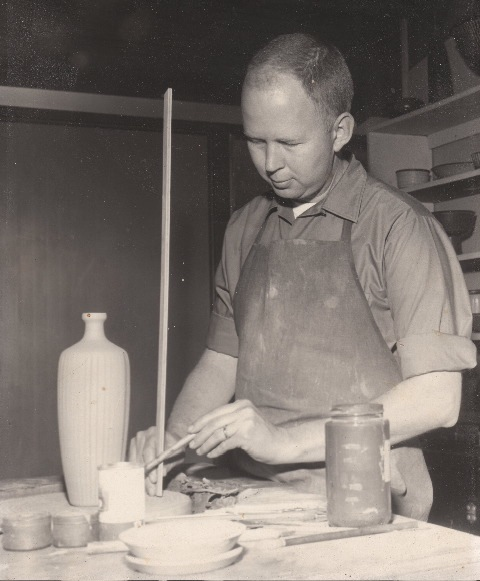
- Born: Rupert Julian Deese; July 16, 1924; Agana, Guam
- Died: July 12, 2010 (aged 85); Claremont, California
- Education: Pomona College, Claremont Graduate School
- Known for: Ceramic art

Rupert Deese (born Rupert Julian Deese and known as Rummy) (July 16, 1924 – July 12, 2010) was an American ceramic artist. He is known for innovative design and decoration of high fired ceramics. Deese wrote "It is my hope in making these vessels that as the perception of their beauty diminishes over time, they will sustain themselves by pleasant usefulness."

== Biography ==
Rupert Deese was born in Agana, Guam, where his father served as a Marine Corps officer. After graduation from high school in 1942, he enlisted in the Army Air Corps, serving stateside as a B-17 mechanic. Deese graduated with a Bachelor of Arts degree in 1950 from Pomona College. After graduation, he starting working as a ceramist in Claremont, California, sharing a studio with ceramist Harrison McIntosh. Their working relationship lasted for more than 60 years. Deese and Helen Smith (September 15, 1925 – June 4, 2010) married in 1951 and reared four children.

In the mid-fifties, supported by a grant from local art patrons Robert and Catherine Garrison, Deese entered Claremont Graduate School, studying ceramics with Richard Petterson and sculpture with Albert Stewart. He also benefited from the community of artists living in Claremont, most notably architect Millard Sheets and Jean and Arthur Ames, who provided encouragement and support in the early years of his career, and from a close-knit circle of young artists including woodworker Sam Maloof and painters Melvin Woods, Jim Hueter, Jim Fuller, and Karl Benjamin.

After receiving his Master of Fine Arts in ceramics in 1957, Deese continued making his own ceramics in his studio. However, like many artists, he found it necessary to supplement his income. After graduation he began teaching ceramics at Mt. San Antonio College in Walnut, California and remained on the faculty until 1971. In 1958 Deese and McIntosh moved their studio to a purpose-built space next to McIntosh's new home in Padua Hills in Claremont. Deese's pottery gained national recognition in 1960 when his covered bean jar won the IBM sweepstakes prize at the prestigious 21st Ceramic National Exhibition at the Everson Museum in Syracuse, New York.

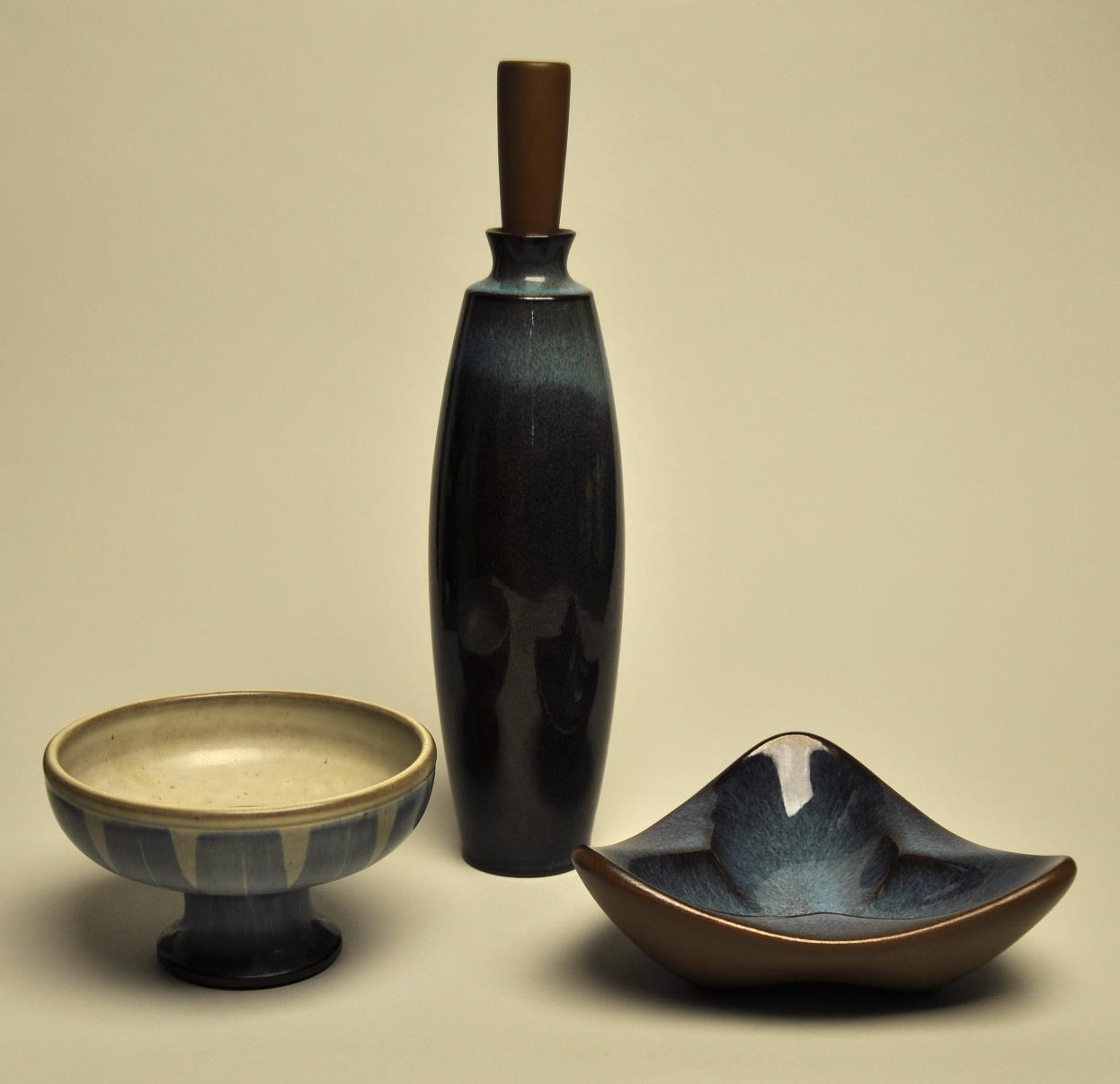
Rupert Deese ceramics

In 1964, Deese accepted a full-time position as a designer in the Franciscan Ceramics division of Interpace (International Pipe and Ceramics Corporation) in Los Angeles. Millard Sheets, as a consultant to the Franciscan Ceramics division, assembled a design team of talented artists, including ceramists Richard Petterson, Dora De Larios, Helen Richter Watson, Henry Takemoto and Jerry Rothman. For the next twenty years until his retirement in 1984, Deese created shapes and patterns for Franciscan dinnerware, glassware, and flatware, including the dinnerware shapes for Madeira, one of the company's best-selling dinnerware patterns. In the evenings and on weekends he continued to work on his own ceramics in his Padua Hills Claremont studio.

In the 1950s, Deese's hand thrown ceramics were available from several interior design firms, including Dean Marshall in La Jolla, California. In the 1970s Deese's ceramics were sold at Gallery 8 in Claremont and in the 1990s at Tobey C. Moss Gallery in Los Angeles. Deese created numerous custom pieces, many of them commissioned by Millard Sheets for clients of his Claremont design studio, including a drinking fountain for Oakmont Elementary School, personalized ashtrays for benefactors of Harvey Mudd College, a bronze tree for the Home Savings of America in Beverly Hills, and a planter for the United States Capitol Members' Dining Room.

== Exhibitions ==
- 1950-1956 Los Angeles County Fair Exhibition, Pomona, California
- 1950-57 Scripps College Art Museum, Claremont, California, Annual Ceramic Show
- 1951-52 Everson Museum, Syracuse, New York, Ceramic National Exhibition
- 1951-52 California State Fair, Sacramento, California
- 1954 Everson Museum, Syracuse, New York, Ceramic National Exhibition
- 1955-57 Pasadena Art Museum, Pasadena, California, California Designed Exhibition I, II, III
- 1956 Everson Museum, Syracuse, New York, Ceramic National Exhibition
- 1957 California State Fair, Sacramento, California
- 1960 Everson Museum, Syracuse, New York, 21st Ceramic National Exhibition
- 1965 Pasadena Art Museum, Pasadena, California, California Design 9
- 1995 Hillcrest Arts Festival, La Habra, California
- 1996 Tobey C. Moss Gallery, Los Angeles, Four Friends, The Work of Rupert Deese, Jim Hueter, Sam Maloof, and Harrison McIntosh
- 1996 Craft and Folk Art Museum Shop, Los Angeles
- 1997 The Chinati Foundation and The Judd Foundation, Marfa, Texas, Rupert Deese, Barnett Newman and Dan Flavin
- 1998 Chaffey Community Art Association, Ontario, California
- 1999 Tobey C. Moss Gallery, Los Angeles, Stoneware
- 2000 Tobey C. Moss Gallery, Los Angeles, Rupert J. Deese (the Elder)Off the Wall, Rupert T. Deese (the Younger) On the Wall
- 2003 Tobey C. Moss Gallery, Los Angeles, Rupert Deese: Stoneware
- 2003 Cuttress Gallery, Pomona, California, Paul Soldner, John Blough, Rupert Deese, and Harrison McIntosh
- 2006 Tobey C. Moss Gallery, Los Angeles, California Modernism
- 2011 Compact Gallery, San Luis Obispo, California, Six Decades of Stoneware
- 2011 The Huntington Library, California, The House That Sam Built: Sam Maloof and Art in the Pomona Valley, 1945–1985
- 2011 Los Angeles County Museum of Art, California, California Design, 1930–1965: Living in a Modern Way
- 2011 American Museum of Ceramic Art, California, Common Ground: Ceramics in Southern California 1945–1975

== Awards ==
- 1950-1951 Los Angeles County Fair Exhibition, Pomona, California. Honorable mention.
- 1951 Everson Museum, Syracuse, New York, Ceramic National Exhibition. Honorable mention
- 1952 California State Fair. Second prize for glaze.
- 1953 St. Paul Gallery, Fiber-Clay-Metal exhibition. Honorable mention and purchase award.
- 1960 Everson Museum, Syracuse, New York, 21st Ceramic National Exhibition. IBM sweepstakes prize.

== Collections ==
- Museum of Fine Arts, Boston, Boston
- Everson Museum, Syracuse, New York
- Henry Art Gallery, University of Washington, Seattle
- Long Beach Museum of Art, Long Beach, California
- Los Angeles County Museum of Art, Los Angeles
- Maloof Foundation, Alta Loma, California
- Millard Sheets Collection, Gualala, California
- Mingei International Museum, San Diego
- Nora Eccles Harrison Museum of Art, Logan, Utah
- Renwick Gallery, Smithsonian Institution, Washington, DC
- Richard & Alice Petterson Museum, Claremont, California
- Roger Corsaw Collection, Alfred University, Alfred, New York
- Scripps College, Claremont, California
- St. Paul Gallery, Minneapolis
- Walker Art Center, Minneapolis
- American Museum of Ceramic Art, Pomona, California
