= Franciscan Ceramics =

American brand of ceramics

Franciscan Ceramics, Inc.
- Industry: Ceramic manufacturing
- Predecessor: Gladding, McBean & Company
- Founded: 1962
- Defunct: 1984
- Fate: Acquired
- Successor: Waterford Wedgwood
- Headquarters: Los Angeles, California, US
- Key people: Antholl McBean; Frederic J. Grant
- Products: Tableware, tile
- Parent: Interpace (1962–1979); Wedgwood (1979–1984)

Franciscan Ceramics are ceramic tableware and tile products produced by Gladding, McBean & Co. in Los Angeles, California, US from 1934 to 1962, International Pipe and Ceramics (Interpace) from 1962 to 1979, and Wedgwood from 1979 to 1983. Wedgwood closed the Los Angeles plant, and moved the production of dinnerware to England in 1983. Waterford Glass Group plc purchased Wedgwood in 1986, becoming Waterford Wedgwood. KPS Capital Partners acquired all of the holdings of Waterford Wedgwood in 2009. The Franciscan brand became part of a group of companies known as WWRD, an acronym for "Wedgwood Waterford Royal Doulton." WWRD continues to produce the Franciscan patterns Desert Rose and Apple.

Trade names were Franciscan Pottery, Franciscan Ware, and Franciscan for dinnerware products. Trade names for tile products were Gladding, McBean, Interpace, Hermosa, Terra Tile, and Contours Tile. Ceramic production included terracotta garden ware, earthenware tableware & art ware, porcelain tableware & art ware, stoneware tableware, stoneware and earthenware tile. Currently only the trade name Franciscan is used by WWRD for tabletop products.

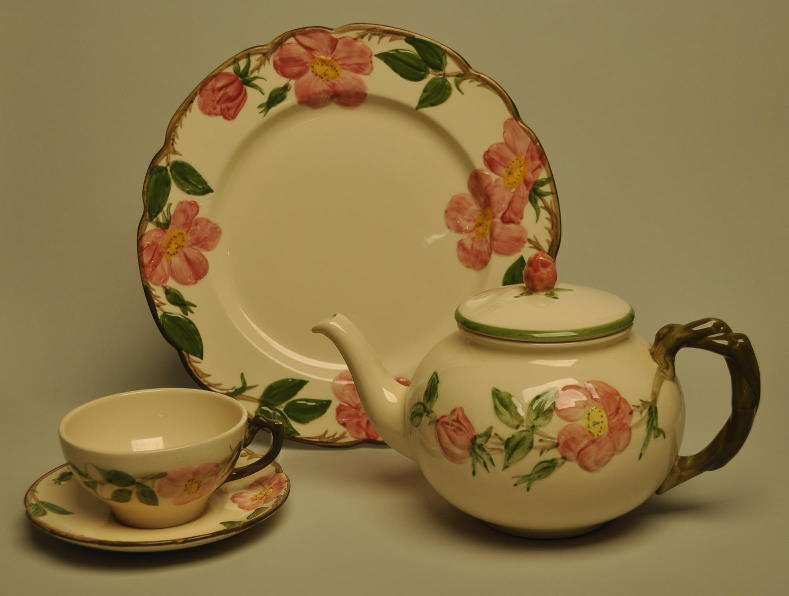
Franciscan Desert Rose

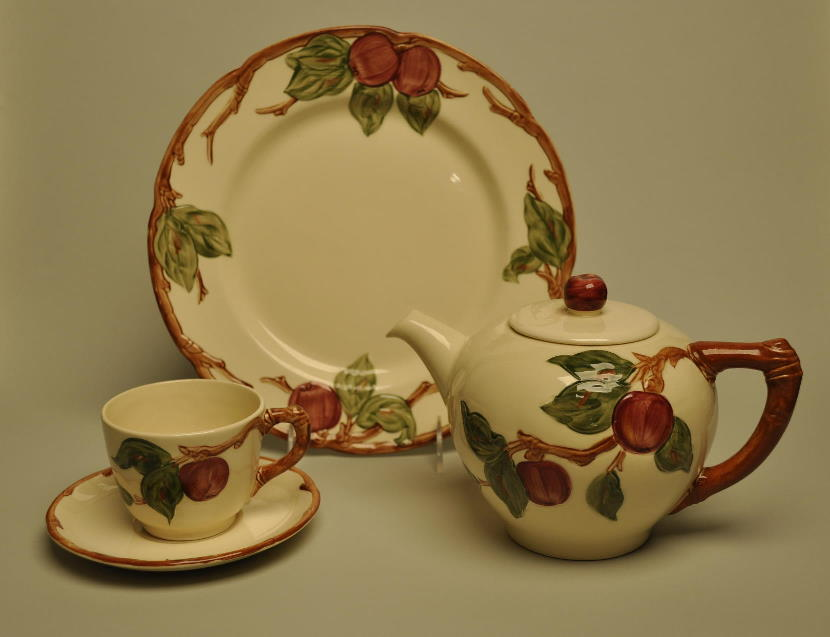
Franciscan Apple

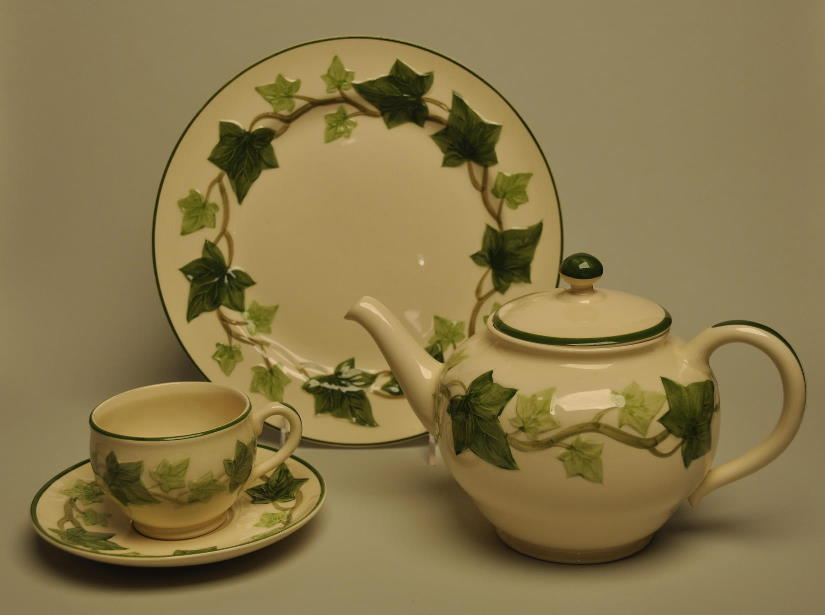
Franciscan Ivy

== Gladding, McBean & Co. ==
Beginning in 1875, as a partnership between Charles Gladding, Peter McGill McBean, and George Chambers, Gladding, McBean & Co. would expand from one factory in Lincoln, California to multiple manufacturing plants throughout the Pacific West Coast producing clay products from sewer pipe to architectural terracotta.

In 1927, Gladding, McBean & Co. consolidated with Los Angeles Pressed Brick Company solidifying the primacy of Gladding, McBean & Co. as the largest terra cotta manufacturer west of the Mississippi. Gladding, McBean & Co. retained ceramic engineer Max Compton from the former Los Angeles Pressed Brick Company's plant in Santa Monica California. Compton, a 1922 graduate of Alfred University, studied under Charles F. Binns. In 1929, Compton was sent to the company's Lincoln plant to work on glazes and shortly thereafter became the plant's superintendent of the terracotta department. Compton would return to Los Angeles in 1937 to work in the glaze laboratory.

In the economic collapse of 1929, Gladding, McBean & Co. saw its revenue decreasing due to the lack of new construction, which was the main source of the demand for its ceramic products: roofing tile, sewer pipe, architectural terracotta, and brick. To offset the loss of revenues from the sales of ceramic building materials, the company began the manufacture of earthenware dinnerware and art ware in 1933 in the former Tropico Potteries factory. Tropico Potteries was acquired by the company in 1923. The forty acre pottery, located at 2901 Los Feliz Boulevard in Los Angeles, California, bordered the city of Glendale. Gladding, McBean & Co. had two plant facilities in Los Angeles, so the former Tropico pottery was named the Glendale plant.

=== 1934–1939 ===
In 1934, Gladding, McBean & Co. hired Frederic J. Grant as a vice-president and the new Glendale dinnerware division's plant manager. Frederic, a chemical engineer, had retired as president of the Weller Pottery Company in Ohio, selling off his interest in the company. After becoming tired of touring around the country as a well known amateur golfer, he made up his mind to become active in business again. Mary K. Grant, prior to her marriage to Frederic, was the art director at R. H. Macy Co. in New York City. The company agreed to have Mary Grant style the pottery lines of tableware and art ware; however at this time she would not hold an official position.

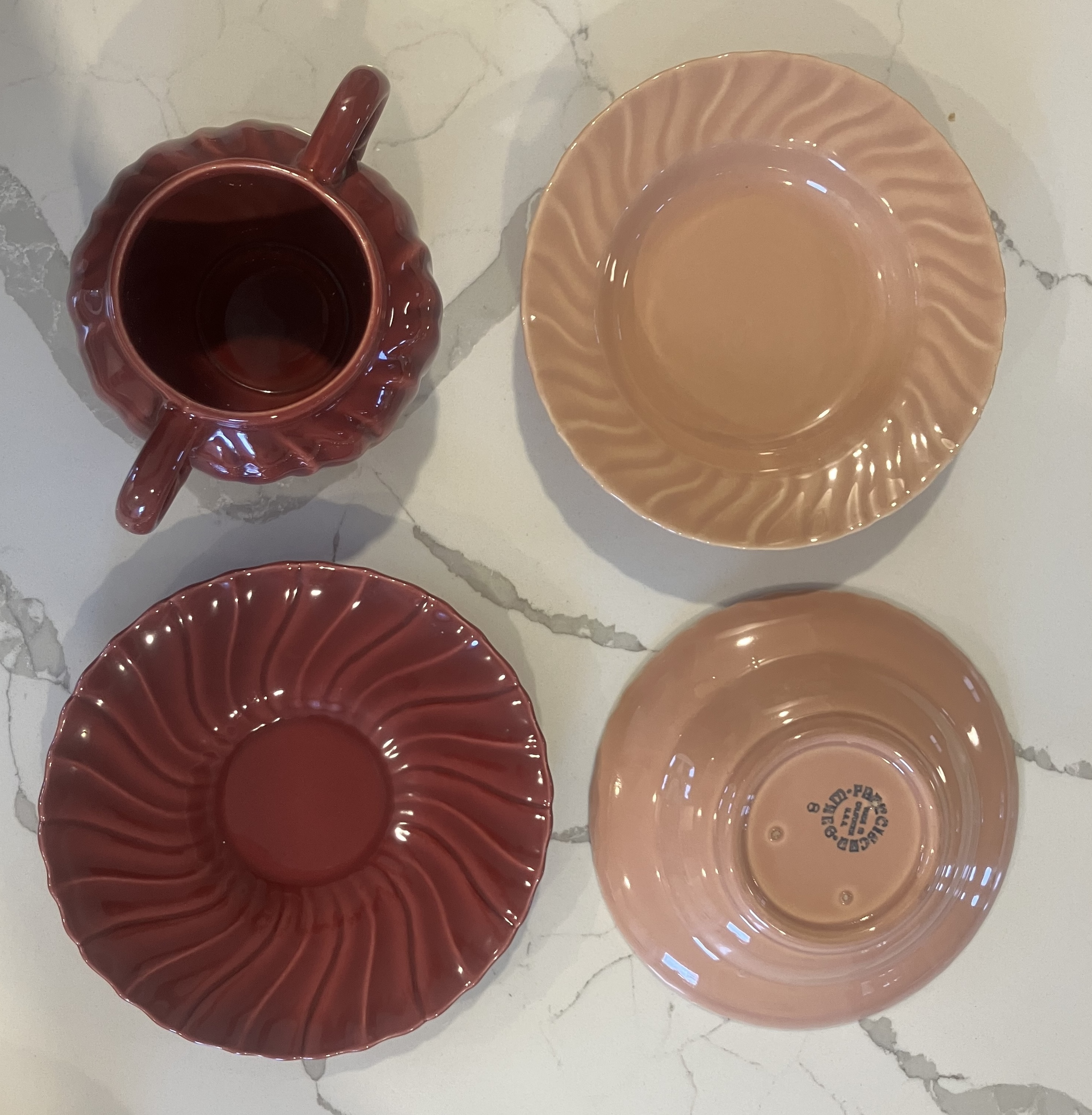
Examples of Franciscan Ware Coronado in solid colour glazes

The tableware and art ware lines, including Coronado, were produced in solid color glazes. Three other Southern California companies were already in production of solid colored dinnerware: J. A. Bauer Pottery Co., Pacific Clay Products Co., and Catalina Clay Products Division of Santa Catalina Island Co. Laboratory testing on the three competitive dinnerware lines revealed all three crazed in an autoclave test.

Gladding, McBean & Co.’s ware would be produced in a new patented earthenware clay body known as Malinite. Dr. Andrew Malinovsky developed the high talc one-fire body using an amorphous flux in 1928 for Gladding, McBean & Co. Malinite was developed for use in the production of one-fire clay tile; however the company made the decision to use Malinite for their dinnerware production. By using the Malinite and adjusting the kiln temperature for a one fire process, the company solved the crazing problem in their own product. Glaze was applied to the unfired body, and the glaze and body matured together in the kiln, saving the company the time and expense of separate biscuit firing for the body. For the new line of pottery, Gladding, McBean & Co. decided to use Prouty tunnel kilns. The Prouty tunnel kiln patents were acquired in the purchase of the West Coast holdings of the American Encaustic Tiling Company in 1933. Prouty tunnel kilns allowed for the continuous flow of ware through the kiln to fire pottery. Thus the plant “combined mills, jiggering units, conveyors, dryers and kilns into a model of straight line output.”

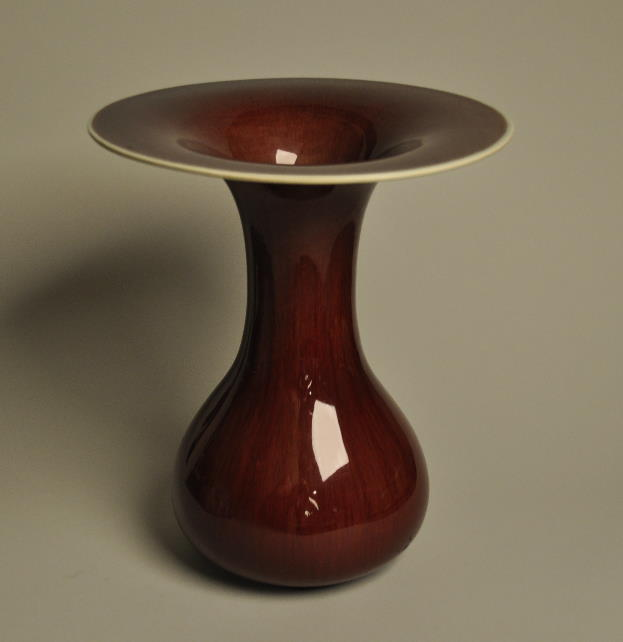
Franciscan Oxblood glaze

After the successful introduction of Franciscan Ware to Gladding, McBean & Co.’s products, Mary K. Grant in 1936 became a paid employee as Lead Stylist and Manager of the Glendale plant’s design department. Mary Grant designed many of the shapes and patterns for Franciscan Ware. The company also purchased shape and pattern designs from contract designers, which would either be used or adapted by Mary Grant for use in the various Franciscan Ware lines of dinnerware and art ware. The popular Coronada tableware with its distinctive swirl pattern and "sculptural feel" was introduced in1937. To sell and market the dinnerware, the company first used the trade name of Franciscan Pottery. Later deciding the word “pottery” denoted an inferior product, the company changed the trade name to Franciscan Ware.

In 1937, Max Compton transferred from Gladding, McBean & Co.’s Lincoln Plant to the Glendale Plant to work on Franciscan Ware glazes, and by 1939 he took over the development the company’s glazes for all of their ceramic products. In an article for Popular Ceramics, Norris Leap wrote, “He produced glazes for art ware that possibly never could have been equaled by either moderns or ancients … One of them is an oxblood red used on large decorative bowls and vases. He experimented with that glaze in odd moments over a period of a dozen or fifteen years. The color comes out in the kiln. By control of heat he controlled the behavior of the coloring. Another unique glaze he produced was a Persian blue, a turquoise blue with pebble effect. Those were just two glazes of thousands he produced.”

Gladding, McBean & Co. acquired Catalina Clay Products on Catalina Island in 1937. Production of Catalina pottery was moved to the Glendale plant with the shapes being integrated into the company's art ware and dinnerware lines. Gladding, McBean & Co. continued to use the trademark Catalina Pottery for art wares.

=== 1940–1951 ===
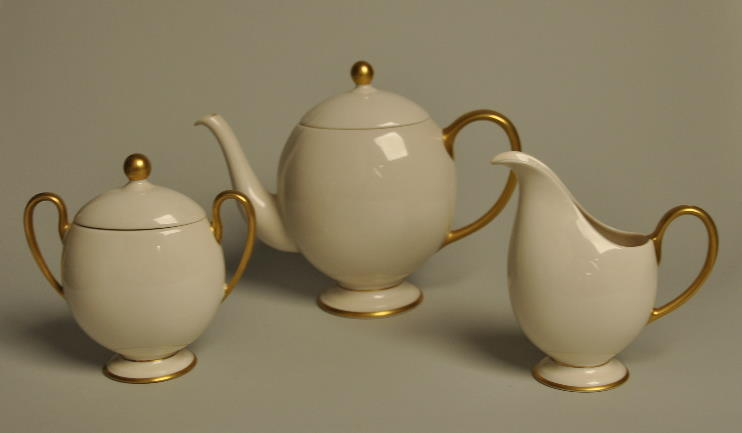
Franciscan Fine China pattern Gold Band introduced in 1949

In 1940, the Gladding, McBean & Co. introduced their first hand-painted embossed earthenware dinnerware line Franciscan Apple, and shortly thereafter in 1941, Desert Rose. Apple was adapted from the embossed pattern Zona, produced by the Weller Pottery Company of Ohio. Desert Rose was based on a pattern design by contract designer Annette Honeywell. Desert Rose would become one of Gladding, McBean & Co.’s bestselling dinnerware lines.

In 1942, after three years of experimentation, Gladding, McBean & Co. entered the fine china market with 14 patterns. The china was considered to have a medium to high cost. The glaze for the fine china line was developed by Max Compton with the shapes and patterns designed by Mary K. Grant, the design staff, and by contract designers.

In 1942, World War II curtailed the introduction of new dinnerware lines and shapes. The Company continued to produce ware already in production, however discontinued all art ware lines. After World War II, the Southern California ceramic industry was booming. From garages to industrial plant facilities, pottery was being made to satisfy demand from the decline of imports from Europe and Japan. Competitors and the biggest potteries in Southern California were Gladding, McBean & Company, J. A. Bauer Pottery Co., Vernon Kilns, and Metlox Potteries.

In 1948, the Company introduced Encanto, a new line of Franciscan fine china designed by Mary Grant. Encanto was introduced in a clear glaze, with or without platinum or gold banding. Encanto, in a clear glaze without banding, was chosen for The Museum of Modern Art 1951 Good Design Exhibition in New York. Also in 1948 the Company introduced Franciscan Ivy, a hand-painted embossed dinnerware pattern. Franciscan Ivy was designed and carved by Mary Jane Winans, a contract designer.

=== 1952–1954 ===
In 1952, a great change was occurring in the direction of the Gladding, McBean & Co., Atholl McBean, president from 1923 to 1938 and chairman of the board since 1938, decided to retire as Chairman though remaining on the board of directors. During his fifty four years of service, Atholl guided the company to a position of being one of the most important ceramic companies in the United States. Also in the fall of 1952, Frederic and Mary Grant resigned from Gladding, McBean & Co.

With a new president and chairman of the board, the company reorganized. A. Lee Bennett became vice president of the newly formed research and development division at the Glendale plant carrying out the company policy of product diversification to maintain its trade position. Under Bennett, Max Compton would continue as chief glaze ceramic engineer and a new design department was created with Mary Jane Winans as the chief designer and stylist. Joining Winans in the newly formed design department were George T. James and Otto Lund. The tile department was managed and headed by Sheridan “Sherry” Stanton, son of architect J.E. Stanton architect of Honnold Library for the Associated Colleges at Claremont. Gladding, McBean & Co. continued to produce their trademarked Franciscan Hermosa tile products at the Glendale plant.

Mary Jane Winans graduated with a degree in Design and Decorative Arts from the Vancouver School of Art, Vancouver B.C. She taught at Vancouver School of Art for two years. Winans became a dinnerware decorator for three years in the decorating department of Gladding, McBean & Co.’s Glendale plant. After her employment as a decorator, Winans worked as a freelance industrial designer in the ceramic industry in the Los Angeles area for twelve years. As a freelance designer for Gladding, McBean & Co., she designed the embossed hand-painted dinnerware patterns Franciscan Ivy and California Poppy. Also she modeled and carved the shapes for the embossed dinnerware patterns Franciscan Apple, Desert Rose, Franciscan Ivy, and California Poppy. George T. James, an Alfred University graduate hired by Gladding, McBean & Co. in 1950 as a ceramic engineer was promoted to the design department. James, an admitted devotee of the Bauhaus movement, sought to bring this aesthetic to his design work. Otto Lund emigrated from Denmark in 1947. He was a pattern designer by trade and prior to his employment at Gladding, McBean & Co. he was the former director of Castleton China's design and decorating department. Lund's mastery was in the painting of flora and fauna, and he used this mastery in designing patterns for the Franciscan fine china lines. Besides designing surface patterns, Lund designed and participated in the development of dinnerware shapes.

The new design team was quickly put into action designing new earthenware dinnerware shapes and patterns to be included in the Gladding, McBean & Co.’s 1954 Franciscan Ware marketing promotion Modern Americana. The Modern Americana promotion included a group of seven new patterns on three different shapes, to complement Franciscan’s popular hand-painted embossed dinnerware lines; Apple, Desert Rose, and Ivy. Two new lines with unique shapes were designed for Modern Americana; the 1800 Eclipse shape designed by George T. James and the 1900 Flair shape designed by Mary Jane Winans. The only shape not designed for Modern Americana was the Metropolitan shape. The Metropolitan shape was designed for Gladding, McBean & Co. by Morris B. Sanders Jr. to be included in the Metropolitan Museum of Art's 1940 Exhibition of Contemporary American Industrial Art. The shape was adapted into a dinnerware line sold by the company as the matt glazed Metropolitan Service from 1940-42. From 1948-54, the shapes were sold in gloss glazes as the dinnerware line Tiempo. Surface patterns for the Modern Americana dinnerware group were Eclipse White, Pomegranate, and Starburst on the Eclipse shape; Flair White, Echo, and Woodlore on the Flair shape; and Trio on the Metropolitan shape. Mary C. Brown, a contract designer, designed the surface patterns Starburst and Pomegranate for the Eclipse shape. For the Flair shape, Brown designed the surface pattern Echo and Woodlore was designed by the contract design group, The Millers. George T. James’ wife Esta James, a ceramist whose ceramics were exhibited at The Egg & The Eye gallery in Los Angeles, designed the surface pattern Trio for the Metropolitan shape. The Modern American group of dinnerware patterns was marketed in the company's promotions in 1954; however the promotion of this grouping ceased in 1955 with all the patterns being folded into the general earthenware lines sold by the company.

=== 1955–1961 ===
In 1955, Gladding, McBean & Co. introduced a new art ware line. The company had ceased manufacturing all their earthenware art ware lines under the trademarks of Franciscan and Catalina in 1942. However, the Company continued until 1955 to manufacture fine china blanks for the Max Shoenfeld Company and earthenware lamp bases for outside companies to assemble and sell under their trade names. This new Franciscan line was named Contours by George T. James. The Contours art ware line was sold in one color or duotone glazes, with or without decoration. The Contours art ware line was the only art ware or dinnerware line the company allowed the designer to use their name on the promotion and marketing. Three Franciscan Contours bud vases were chosen for the Pasadena Art Museum's second California Design Exhibition in 1956. Franciscan Contours did not appeal to the buying public, and was discontinued shortly after its introduction.

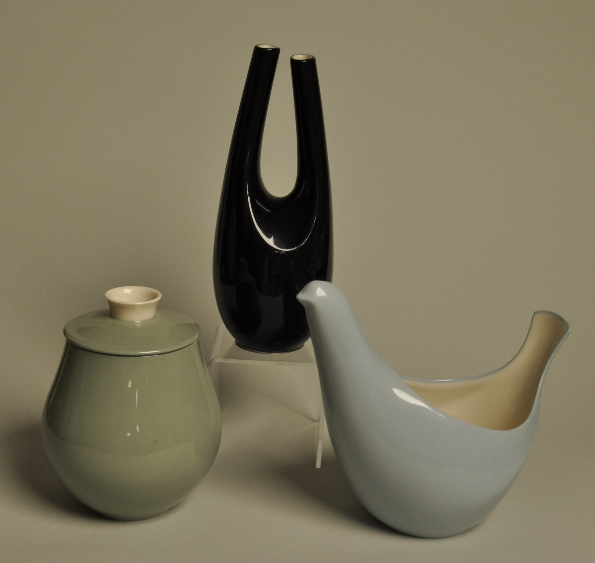
Franciscan Contours by George T. James

The late 1950s brought foreign imports flooding the American dinnerware market as well as the introduction of new competitive dinnerware manufacturing processes, melamine used in the brand Melmac and CorningWare by Corning Glass Works, placing pressure on Gladding, McBean & Co. to manufacture and market lower cost dinnerware lines to compete in the lower price tier dinnerware market. The only lower priced dinnerware line, introduced in 1958, to be manufactured in the Glendale plant was the earthenware Family China line designed by George T. James. Two lower priced dinnerware lines were produced in Japan and introduced in 1959. The earthenware Whitestone Ware, designed by George T. James, was manufactured by Toyo Toki Kaisha, and the Cosmopolitan China, designed by Mary Jane Winans, was manufactured by Nippon Toki Kaisha.

Even with adding dinnerware lines to compete in the lower priced tiers, Gladding, McBean & Co. saw revenue fall in the dinnerware division. However, revenue was up in all other divisions. Aside from the dinnerware division, which was marketed throughout the United States and exported to other countries, the company was limited in all their other product divisions to distribution to the west coast states. To expand the market for all their products, the company made the decision to merge with an established East coast company to create a national and international corporation.

== Interpace ==
In 1962, West coast based Gladding, McBean & Company merged with East coast based Lock Joint Pipe Company merged, forming a new corporation: International Pipe and Ceramics Corporation. The Lock Joint Pipe Company, based in New Jersey, was the largest producer of pre-stressed concrete pressure pipe in the United States and one of the leading manufacturers of concrete sewer, culvert, and sub-aqueous pipe. The merged companies became one of the four hundred largest corporations in the United States with sales of over one hundred million. Allan M. Hirsh, Jr., the former President of Lock Joint became the President of the newly formed corporation. Atholl McBean would continue to give his guidance to the corporation and serve as a member of the board.

International Pipe and Ceramics Corporation's corporate name was later changed to Interpace: from International Pipe and Ceramics. The former corporate headquarters for Gladding, McBean & Co. were moved to Interpace's new corporate headquarters’ in Parsippany, New Jersey. Management in New Jersey began their new mandate to overhaul operations in all their divisions. Gladding, McBean's former Glendale plant was now Franciscan Ceramics, Inc., a division of Interpace.

=== 1963–1978 ===
Millard Sheets was hired as a consultant to Interpace in 1963. One of his projects included the development of a new design staff for tile and dinnerware. George T. James resigned. Elliot House was hired as the manager of the dinnerware design department. Elliot House was formerly the design manager for the Southern California pottery Vernon Kilns. In 1966, George T. James returned as the manager of design & development department replacing Elliot House. Hired on a contract basis for designing tile were ceramists Dora De Larios, Harrison McIntosh, and Jerry Rothman. Hired on a contract basis for designing dinnerware were ceramists Richard Petterson and Helen Richter Watson. Hired full-time as dinnerware designers were Rupert J. Deese, and Francis Chun, joining Mary Jane Winans and Otto Lund. Ceramist Henry Takemoto joined Max Compton in the glaze department. In 1969, Henry Takemoto was hired as a full-time dinnerware designer. Notable ceramists hired on a consultant basis included Kenneth Price in the research & development group and Chouinard Art Institute graduates Mineo Mizuno and Elsa Rady were hired as trainee designers in 1968.

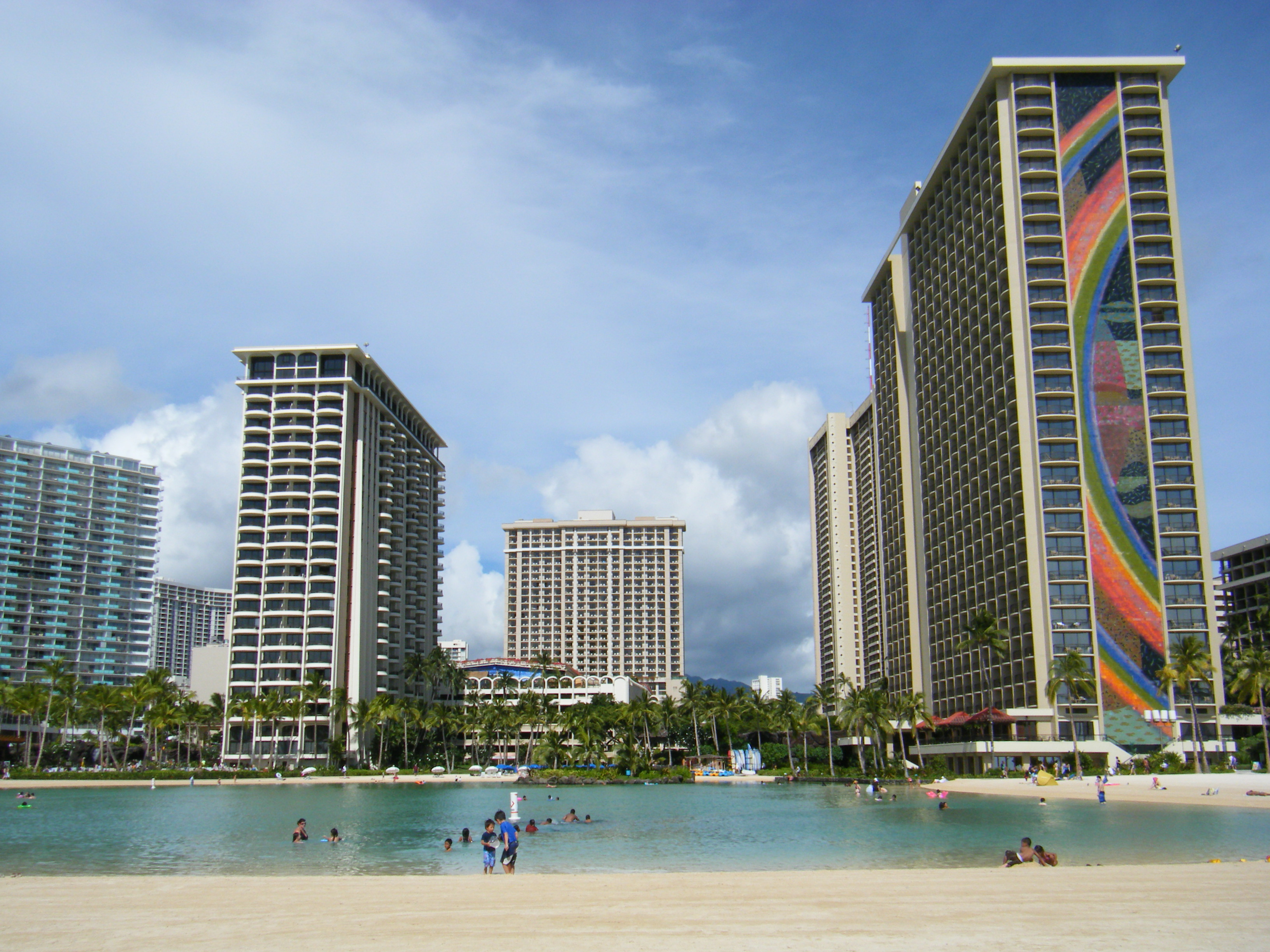
Hilton Rainbow Village: Rainbow Tower

The tile design team innovated new glazes and methods for decorating 12" by 12" tiles for wall murals. Major ceramic tile wall murals completed and still in existence include: Jules Stein Eye Institute outpatient clinic at UCLA, donated by Walt Disney and designed by Mary Blair (1966); North and South facades of the Honolulu Hilton Rainbow hotel, designed by Millard Sheets (1968); Disney World Contemporary Resort, Grand Canyon Concourse fourth floor lobby, designed by Mary Blair (1970); and Los Angeles City Hall East Family of Man West and East facades, designed by Millard Sheets (1972).

The dinnerware design team designed the Madeira line of patterns, an innovative studio potter shape dinnerware. One of the companies top selling pattern on the Madeira shape designed by Rupert J. Deese was the pattern Madeira designed by Jerry Rothman with a dark glaze developed by Kathy Takemoto. The company also introduced a new fine china shape. The 7000 shape was designed by George T. James. Francis Chun designed many of the patterns on the 7000 shape.

=== 1968–1978 ===
In 1968, Interpace acquired its second largest company, Shenango China. Shenango was the owner and maker of Castleton China and was a large supplier of restaurant china. Shenango had acquired Mayer China in 1964 was included in the acquisition. The design staff of each division was maintained separately. However, Shenango manufactured Franciscan's Gourmet line of stoneware dinnerware and cookware. Franciscan Gourmet was designed by Otto Lund and Jeffrey Tousley.

In 1969, Interpace purchased the Tiffin Glass Company, Tiffin, Ohio and began to manufacture glass to coordinate with their Franciscan dinnerware lines. Expanding Franciscan ware to the European market, Interpace bought the Alfred Meakin company of Tunstall, Stoke-on-Trent, England and Myott, Son & Co. Ltd. The Madeira line shapes were adapted to the existing equipment of the Alfred Meakin pottery by George T. James to produce the pattern Madeira and other Franciscan patterns for the European market.

Millard Sheets resigned as a consultant to the Franciscan Ceramics division in 1973. "In 1975, the division suffered from the adverse effects of the general economy. The nation's longest recession since World War II drained consumer confidence and led to lower real spending on consumer household durables." In 1976 Interpace sold Alfred Meakin to a group of investors and the former Gladding, McBean Lincoln plant to Pacific Coast Building Products. In 1977, all fine china products were discontinued. Mary Jane Winans and Otto J. Lund retired, and George T. James and Mineo Mizuno resigned in 1977.

== Wedgwood, 1979–present ==
In 1979 Interpace sold the Franciscan Ceramics division in Los Angeles to Wedgwood, Shenango China Company to the Anchor Hocking corporation, and Mayer China to a group of investors. The Tiffin Glass division of Interpace was sold to Towle Silversmiths. All glassware sold through Franciscan was discontinued. Tiffin closed in 1980. Interpace corporation was dissolved in 1984. After the sale of Franciscan Ceramics to Wedgwood in 1979, the design group was reorganized.

In 1984, Wedgwood closed the Franciscan Ceramics division, what was the former Gladding, McBean & Co.'s Glendale plant in Los Angeles. The production of the Franciscan patterns Desert Rose, Apple, and Fresh Fruit were moved to the Johnson Brothers division of Wedgwood in England. All other dinnerware and tile lines were discontinued. Archival examples of the Franciscan ware were packed up and given to the Wedgwood Museum.

In 1986, Waterford Glass Group plc purchased Wedgwood and the group was renamed Waterford Wedgwood. In March 2009, KPS Capital Partners announced that it had acquired group assets in a range of countries, including the UK, US and Indonesia, would invest €100m, and move a jobs to Asia to cut costs and return the firm to profitability. In the acquisition of the Wedgwood-Waterford holdings, the Franciscan brand was also acquired. The Franciscan brand is now a part of the WWRD - The Luxury Lifestyle Group. WWRD is an acronym for "Wedgwood Waterford Royal Doulton." The Franciscan patterns Desert Rose and Apple continue to be manufactured under the Franciscan brand by WWRD in China. In 2011, Franciscan Apple was discontinued followed by the discontinuation of Desert Rose in 2013. The use of the brand name Franciscan Ware was retired in 2013.

The Fiskars Corporation, a Finnish maker of home products, agreed to buy 100% of the holdings of WWRD. On 2 July 2015 the acquisition of WWRD by Fiskars Corporation was completed including brands Waterford, Wedgwood, Royal Doulton, Royal Albert and Rogaška. The acquisition was approved by the US antitrust authorities.

== In popular culture ==
In Prizzi's Honor (1985) Starburst dinnerware in the kitchen cabinet.

- In Hazel (TV series), George and Dorothy Baxter use Franciscan Apple.
- In Golden Girls, Season 1 Episode 3, Sofia, Dorothy, and Blanche have tea out of a Desert Rose Teapot.
- In I Dream of Jeannie, Captain/Major Anthony "Tony" Nelson's dinnerware is Apple Franciscan.
- In I Love Lucy, the Ricardo's dinnerware is Franciscan Ivy. Lucy also uses Franciscan fine china for special occasions, and Franciscan Tiempo for card games.
- In Malcolm in the Middle, Franciscan Larkspur is the family's dinnerware.
- In Graceland, home to Elvis Presley in Memphis, Tennessee, Presley's dinnerware is Franciscan Apple.
- In 1962, the John F. Kennedy administration purchased a special service of Franciscan fine china with the seal of the president of the United States for Air Force One.
- In 2013, the movie "Gangster Squad" starring James Brolin as Sgt. John O'Mara, the Franciscan pattern Desert Rose were the dishes on the breakfast table in the O'Mara kitchen.
- In Northern Exposure, season 4, episode 14, the china in Maggie's home in Grosse Pointe, Michigan is Desert Rose.
- In Better Call Saul, season 1, episode 5, the china Saul is using is Franciscan Sundance.
- In the mid-1990s, a Got Milk? commercial about a desperate airline pilot has two Franciscan Eclipse Starburst cups, some saucers and a relish plate (and milk) on the stewardess' cart in the first class section.
- In 1999 the movie Blast from the Past, starring Brendan Fraser and Alicia Silverstone, in the beginning, some people attending the dinner party are using small Franciscan Starburst plates while eating buffet style.
- In 2018 the television show Young Sheldon, starring a young Sheldon from The Big Bang Theory his Grandmother (his Meemaw) owns plates, bowls and a complete tea set. First seen in S01-E22.
- In 2019, Amy Farrah Fowler's mother in The Big Bang Theory television series has Franciscan Apple dishes.
- In Gilmore Girls, Babette's dishes are Franciscan Apple used in many scenes.
- In 2020's Lovecraft Country, in the episode "Holy Ghost", the character Hippolyta's breakfast dishes are Desert Rose.
