= Mary K. Grant =

American ceramic designer

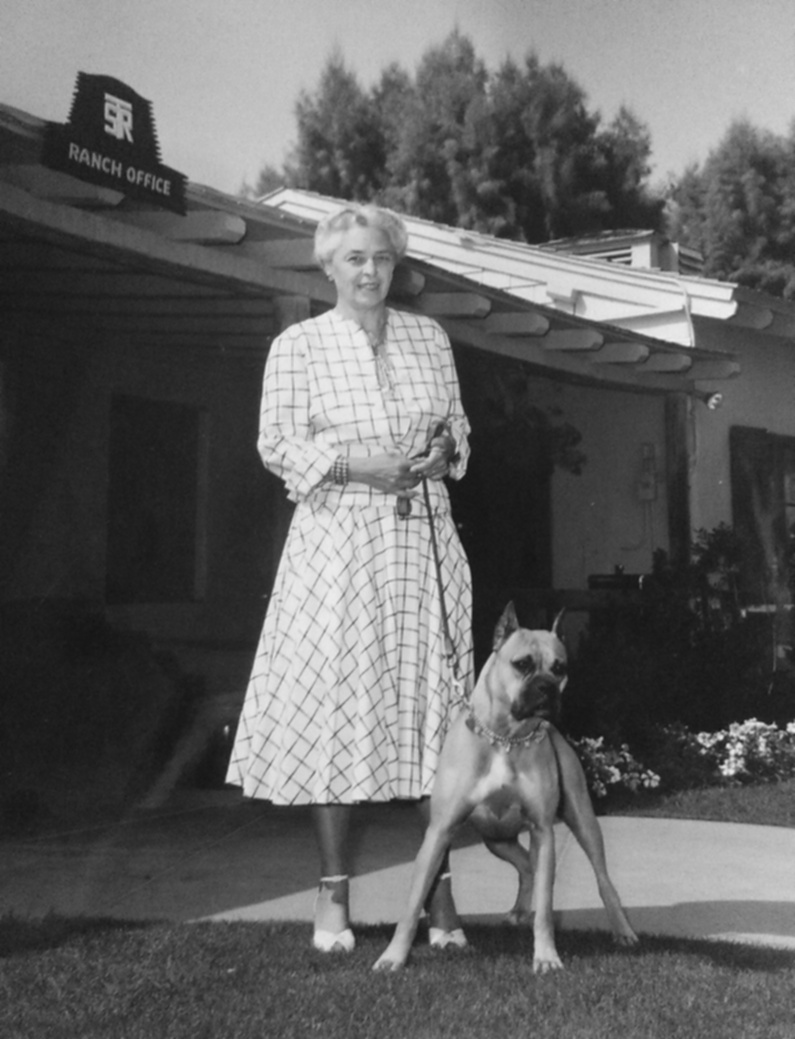
- Born: Ethel May Kubishta; April 21, 1902; New York City
- Died: April 8, 1975 (aged 72); Ojai, California
- Known for: Ceramic art

Mary K. Grant, (born Ethel May Kubishta) (April 21, 1902 – April 8, 1975) was an American industrial designer. Grant is known for her ceramic designs for Franciscan Ceramics manufactured by Gladding, McBean & Co. Grant designed several fine china and earthenware shapes for Gladding, McBean. Grant designed the American Franciscan dinnerware shapes for Desert Rose, Apple, and Ivy. Grant's Franciscan fine china shape Encanto was chosen by the Metropolitan Museum of Art for good design in 1951.

== Biography ==
Mary K. Grant was born in New York City. Grant, early in her career, taught in a well-known New York art school. Mary was known in New York professionally as Mary Kay. Grant wrote reviews under the pen name of Kay about linens for the magazine Linens and Domestic and articles for the Crockery and Glass Journal. Both magazines were published by the Haire Publishing Company. Grant became a stylist and the Art Director for R. H. Macy Co. in New York City. After working for Macy's, Mary worked for the linen firm of Fallani-Cohn as a designer. Mary Grant was one of the founders of the Fashion Group, one of the largest and most influential of career women's groups in the country in the 1930s.

Mary Grant married Frederic J. Grant (1895–1982) on October 26, 1933. Frederic Grant graduated from Yale University. After graduating he joined the US Air Service serving in the Second Balloon Company in France during the First World War. He was one of 20 American air servicemen who were honored for spending the longest continuous front line duty in World War I. After his service, with post graduate work at both the Harvard School of Business Administration and the Massachusetts Institute of Technology, he was a vice president with Weller Pottery for eleven years.

== Career ==
Mary and Frederic Grant moved to California in 1933. In the early 1930s, the California pottery Gladding, McBean began researching producing tableware and art pottery to add to their terra cotta pottery production. Gladding, McBean & Co. hired Frederic Grant as the Company's pottery manager for their Los Angeles pottery factory. The pottery became known as Gladding, McBean's Glendale plant. Gladding, McBean agreed to have Mary Grant style the pottery lines of dinnerware and art ware; however, she would not hold an official position until 1936 with the title of Lead Stylist, later renamed Chief Stylist and Designer. As Chief Stylist, Grant oversaw the design process from the submissions of designs to adapting the designs to the ceramic shapes. As a designer, Grant designed dinnerware, fine china, and art. Grant decided when a pattern was to be put into production or not, sometimes delaying patterns so they would be successful. Grant adapted contract designers design conceptualizations onto Franciscan patterns. Gladding, McBean's earthenware patterns El Patio, and Coronado, styled and designed by Grant, were included in the 1939 Decorative Art Studio Yearbook to represent good design for table décor.

In 1940, Grant designed the shapes and styled the apple pattern for Franciscan Apple. In 1941, Grant designed the shapes and styled the rose pattern, conceptualized by Annette Honeywell, for Franciscan Desert Rose. In 1941, Gladding, McBean introduced fine china. The shapes for the fine china lines were styled and designed by Grant. Franciscan Ivy with the shapes and the ivy pattern styled by Grant was introduced in 1948. Mary Grant in 1951 designed the earthenware pattern and shape Wheat. On April 13, 1954, the shape & design of Wheat was granted patent 171,938 with Mary Grant as assignor to Gladding, McBean & Co. The Franciscan Wheat pattern was introduced in 1953 with two glaze variations; summer tan and winter green. In 1951, the Franciscan fine china Encanto, in a clear glaze without banding, was chosen for The Museum of Modern Art 1951 Good Design Exhibition in New York. The Encanto shape was designed by Grant.

In November 1952, Mary and Frederic Grant left Gladding, McBean & Co. Frederic and his former Gladding, McBean assistant manager Harold Jacoby formed the Grant-Jacoby Co., after leaving Gladding, McBean. Mary designed a line of fiberglass trays and bowls for The Grant-Jacoby Co.’s Granoby Originals line. The fiberglass trays and bowls were manufactured by the Calfibe Co. in Mentone, California. The line was discontinued after Calfibe Co. decided to accept government contracts instead of producing consumer goods.

In 1954, the Grants acquired the controlling interest of Weil Ceramics in Los Angeles. The founder of Weil Ceramics, Max Weil died in 1954. The Grants renamed Weil Ceramics to Grant Ceramics. Mary designed new dinnerware patterns and shapes for Grant Ceramics. Grant Ceramics was liquidated in 1956.

Grant was an accomplished cook and enjoyed entertaining in her Smoke Tree Ranch home in Palm Springs, California. In 1975, Mary Grant died in Ojai, California at the age of 73.

== Bibliography ==
- Franciscan An American Tradition. By Bob Page, Dale Frederiksen, et al. (Replacements, LTD, 1999) ISBN 978-1889977072
- Franciscan, Catalina, and Other Gladding, McBean Wares: Ceramic Table and Art Wares 1873–1942. By James F. Elliot-Bishop. (Schiffer Publishing, 2001)ISBN 978-0764314124
- Franciscan Hand-Decorated Embossed Dinnerware. By James F. Elliot-Bishop. (Schiffer Publishing, 2004)ISBN 978-0764319860
