= Lisa Reinertson =

American sculptor

- Born: 1955
- Education: University of California, Davis
- Occupation: Sculptor
- Known for: Public sculpture

Lisa Reinertson (born 1955) is an American sculptor who works in ceramics and bronze.

== Work ==
When reviewing Reinertson's 2013 show Edge of Extinction for Ceramics Art & Perception, Deb Van Laak wrote that Reinertson's work has "always carried humanitarian influences." Reinertson earned her MFA in 1984 at UC Davis, where she studied under Robert Arneson. In 1989, she created a slightly larger than life-size bronze sculpture of Martin Luther King, Jr. for the Martin Luther King, Jr. Memorial Park in Kalamazoo, Michigan. Her 1993 bust of Senator Dianne Feinstein is on display in San Francisco City Hall.

In 2019, her statue Neptune's Daughter, which depicts a woman cradling a pelican, was installed on the waterfront of Benicia, her hometown. Reinertson donated the piece to the city, and said she hoped the sculpture served as a "reminder of the diligence needed to keep our waters healthy for our futures." More of her public sculptures are located at UC Davis, Fairfield, Vacaville, and Sacramento.

Her work has also been exhibited at the American Museum of Ceramic Art and Crocker Art Museum.
