= Elsa Rady =

American ceramist

- Born: 29 July 1943; New York, New York
- Died: 29 January 2011 (aged 67); Culver City, California
- Known for: Ceramics

Elsa Rady (July 29, 1943 – January 29, 2011) was an American ceramist.

Born in New York City on July 29, 1943, Rady was the daughter of Lily Mehlman Rady, a former dancer for Martha Graham, and Simon Rady, a record executive and producer. By the age of seven she was taking ceramics classes with her older sister, Jane. From 1962 until 1966 she studied at the Chouinard Art Institute, where her instructors included Ralph Bacerra and Otto and Vivika Heino. She worked for two years in the 1960s at Interpace, returning there from 1989 to 1994, and designed pieces for the Swid Powell company as well. During the 1994 Northridge earthquake she lost 70 works, valued at $225,000, despite packing them in carpet tubing as a precaution. Rady kept a studio in Venice, California, for many years. She died in Culver City after suffering from health problems for a while.

Rady was the recipient of grants from the National Endowment for the Arts, in 1981, and the California Arts Council, in 1983. Several of her pieces are in the collection of the Smithsonian American Art Museum; others are owned by the Metropolitan Museum of Art; the Cooper-Hewitt; the Museum of Fine Arts, Boston; the Los Angeles County Museum of Art; and the Victoria & Albert Museum. Rady died on January 29, 2011, in Culver City, California.
