= Stanislav V'Soske =

Stanislav V'Soske (1899–1983) was an American carpet designer and manufacturer, known as "the dean of American rug design" and the co-founder of V'Soske Inc.

V'Soske's carpets are held in collections and exhibits at the Museum of Modern Art, Cooper Hewitt, Smithsonian Design Museum, and formerly the White House.
