= Gertrud Natzler =

Austrian-American ceramicist

- Gertrud and Otto Natzler
- Born: Gertrud Amon; 7 July 1908; Vienna, Austria
- Died: 3 June 1971 (aged 63)
- Occupation: Ceramicist

Gertrud Amon Natzler (7 July 1908 – 3 June 1971) was an Austrian-American ceramicist, who together with her husband Otto Natzler created some of the most praised ceramics art of the 20th century, helping to elevate ceramics to the status of a fine art.

== Early life ==
Gertrud Amon was born on 7 July 1908 in Vienna, Austria, to a Jewish family. She was the daughter of Adolf Amon, who ran a stationery company, and Helene née Grünwald. She had one older brother, Hans.

After graduating from the Handelsakademie, Vienna's commercial school, she studied painting and drawing as well as working as a secretary. In 1933 met Otto Natzler, who had been laid off from a job as a textile designer, although their romance did not blossom until after he divorced his first wife in 1934.

== Career ==
Gertrud started to have an interest in pottery, and got Otto interested as well. After teaching themselves and studying at the ceramics studio of Franz Iskra, they opened their own studio and worked full-time as ceramicists. Otto and Gertrud soon became recognised for their art. Their first exhibition was in 1937, at the Galerie Würthle. On 11 March 1938, they learned that their works exhibited at the Exposition Internationale des Arts et Techniques dans la Vie Moderne had been awarded a silver medal. Later the same day, German troops marched into Austria, precipitating the annexation of Austria by Nazi Germany. They immediately began preparing to leave for the United States, with the help of Otto's cousin in Los Angeles. They married in June, and left Austria for Los Angeles in September.

The Natzlers started a new studio in Los Angeles, where she remained for the rest of her life. At first, they used a wheel and kiln brought from Vienna, and they made a living by offering individual instruction at their studio as well as selling their work. Recognition of the Natzlers' work in the United States began in 1938, when they won first prize at the National Ceramic Exhibition at the Syracuse Museum of Fine Arts. Their first full exhibition was in San Diego the following year, and it was followed by many more over the three decades thereafter. Between 1956 and 1960, the Natzlers were summer artists-in-residence at the Brandeis Institute.

For the most part, Gertrud worked as a potter and Otto as a glazer. Gertrud was remarkable from their Vienna days for throwing thin-walled vessels. From her early days in California, she was recognised for her skill at creating forms of "delicacy" by potters such as Harrison McIntosh. New York Times critic Lisa Hammel remarked in 1986 that her work was "always in equilibrium…Even the most violent glazes are held in a state of restraint by Gertrud's thin, gently curving shapes". Over her career, she threw more than 25,000 vessels.

In Natzler's words:

It must of necessity start out with the centering of the clay. This takes strength and an iron grip. The further the form develops, the more delicate the touch must become until in the end there is simply a describing of the curve, a movement of hands - with the yielding clay in between - that determines the final line. In the end, it will be like a form grown by nature, something alive, as indeed it is, having become infused with the life the sensitive hand has lent it.

== Later life and legacy ==
Gertrud Natzler died of cancer on 3 June 1971, leaving behind hundreds of unfinished pieces. Otto abandoned his work for over a year after her death, but encouraged by his third wife, Gail Reynolds, he began the process of firing and glazing around ten a year, "extending their collaboration for over 22 years past her death." These pieces continued to garner new and retrospective exhibitions. Among the prominent museums to hold retrospectives of the Natzlers' work were the Renwick Gallery in Washington, D.C. (1973), the Craft and Folk Art Museum in Los Angeles (1977), and the American Craft Museum in New York (1993). In 1994, two exhibitions of her work were held in Vienna, one at the Historical Museum of the City of Vienna, and one at the Jewish Museum Vienna. Their work is also held in the permanent collections of the Nelson-Atkins Museum of Art, the Seattle Art Museum, the University of Michigan Museum of Art, the Cooper Hewitt, and the Museum of Modern Art.

In 2001, Gertrud was posthumously awarded the Gold Medal for Consummate Craftsmanship of the American Craft Council together with her husband. Otto also eventually started a career as a solo artist, that lasted nearly until his death in 2007. Natzler's work was included in the Baltimore Museum of Art's 2020 exhibit Free Form: 20th-Century Studio Craft which focused on "American women in the applied arts."

The Natzler's pieces Vase, 1965 and Bowl, 1968 were acquired by the Smithsonian American Art Museum as part of the Renwick Gallery's 50th Anniversary Campaign.
