= Chris Gustin =

American ceramicist

- Born: 1952 (age 73–74); Chicago, Illinois
- Education: Kansas City Art Institute,
- Known for: ceramics
- Spouse: Nancy Train Smith

Chris Gustin (born 1952 in Chicago, Illinois) is an American ceramicist. Gustin models his work on the human form, which is shown through the shape, color, and size of the pieces.

== Education and career ==
Though born in the Midwest, Gustin grew up in Los Angeles, where his parents managed and co-owned several commercial ceramic factories. Growing up with these influences, Gustin developed an interest in ceramics. At his first semester at the University of California—Irvine, he majored in biology and sociology and enrolled in an introductory ceramics course under John Mason. After that initial semester, Gustin quit school to continue working in one of his parents' factories, Wildwood Ceramics. He worked there for two years and became the foreman and manager.

After leaving Wildwood Ceramics in 1972, Gustin returned to school. He received his BFA in ceramics form the Kansas City Art Institute in 1975. Two years later, he earned his Masters of Fine Arts from the New York State College of Ceramics at Alfred University. In that time, Gusting and his sister-in-law, Jane, began studio work together, each creating their own personalized ceramic work.

Gustin's teaching career began in 1978. From 1978 to 1980, he taught at Parson's School of Design in New York. In 1980, he became an Assistant Professor of Ceramics at Boston University, New Bedford, MA, in 1985, and Gustin moved with it, becoming an Associate Professor of Ceramics, later becoming the head of the ceramics program. During a ten-year tenure Gustin became a senior faculty member, serving as an Associate Professor of Ceramics.

Amidst the years spent teaching, moving from school to school, Gustin continued work on other artistic endeavors. In 1986, he partnered with artists Margaret Griggs, George Mason, and Lynn Duryea to restore an old brick factory in Newcastle, ME. Through their efforts, the building became the Watershed Center for the Ceramic Arts. More than 100 artists per year come to Watershed to work.

In 1994, Gustin and his wife, painter Nancy Train Smith, began designing their own home. They collaborated with the architect Michele Foster, and Gustin produced every piece of tile that was used in building the home. This experience led him to establish Gustin Ceramics Tile Production.

In 1999, Gustin retired from teaching to devote time to his studio work and to Gustin Ceramic Tile Productions.

Gustin has stated:

I want my work to...suggest something that is just on the other side of consciousness. I don't want my pots to conjure up a singular recollection, but ones that change with each glance, with each change of light.

== Museum collections ==
Gustin is represented in the following museum collections:

- American Museum of Ceramic Art, Pomona, CA
- Archie Bray Foundation for the Ceramic Arts, Helena, MT
- Arizona State University, Tempe, AZ
- Currier Museum of Art, Manchester, NH
- Daum Museum of Contemporary Art, Sedalia, MO
- Everson Museum of Art, Syracuse, NY
- Icheon World Ceramic Center, Icheon, Korea
- Kalamazoo Institute of Arts, Kalamazoo, MI
- Los Angeles County Museum of Art, Los Angeles, CA
- Mint Museum, Charlotte, NC
- Museum of Arts and Design, New York City, NY
- Racine Art Museum, Racine, WI
- Renwick Gallery of the Smithsonian American Art Museum, Washington D.C.
- Rhode Island School of Design Museum, Providence, RI
- San Angelo Museum of Fine Arts, San Angelo, TX
- Shigaraki Ceramic Cultural Park, Shiga Prefecture, Japan
- Victoria and Albert Museum, London, England

== Selected solo exhibitions ==
Gustin's solo exhibitions around the U.S. include:

- 2014: Chris Gustin: Masterworks in Clay, American Museum of Ceramic Art, Pomona, CA
- 2013: Chris Gustin: Recent Works, Lighthouse Art Center, Jupiter, GL (now Lighthouse ArtCenter Gallery, Tequesta, FL)
- 2010: Circling into Now, University of Massachusetts-Dartmouth, Dartmouth, MA
- 2006: Embodiment, Sculptures Objects Functional Art+ Design Fair, Chicago, IL
- 2003: Elder Gallery, New York City, NY
- 2002: Judy Ann Goldman Fine Arts, Boston, MA
- 1999: Gallery Material, Scottsdale, AZ
- 1999: Paul Mellon Arts Center, Wallingford, CT
- 1994: Manchester Craftsmen's Guild, Pittsburgh, PA
- 1992: Pro Art Gallery, St. Louis, MO
- 1988: Kalamazoo Institute of Arts, Kalamazoo, MI
- 1984: Ree Schonlau Gallery, Omaha, NE
- 1981: Greenwich House Gallery, Greenwich House Pottery, New York City, NY

== Selected group exhibitions ==
Gustin's work has been included in the following group exhibitions, both national and international:

- 2017: Variations on a Theme: Teapots from RAM's Collection, Racine Art Museum, Racine WI
- 2014: Magic Mud: Masterworks in Clay from RAM's Collection, Racine Art Museum, Racine, Wi
- 2013: Sasama International Symposium Exhibition, Verkehr Museum, Shizuoka, Japan
- 2013: Stark Contrasts: Black and White Ceramics from RAM's Collection, Racine Art Museum, Racine, WI
- 2011: The Elusive Teabowl, Lacoste Gallery, Concord, MA
- 2009: Simply Formal, Museum of Anthropology, Arizona State University, Tempe, AZ
- 2008: Into the Woods: A Fiery Tail, American Museum of Ceramic Art, Pomona, CA
- 2008: Shino: Snow and Fire, the Madison de la Céramique Contemporaine, Giroussens, France
- 2007: Skin of Asia, the 4th World Ceramic Biennial Invitational Exhibition, Icheon World Ceramic Center, Icheon, Korea
- 2004: Teapots: Objects to Subject, Craft Alliance, St. Louis, MO (now Craft Alliance Center of Art + Design, University City, MO)
- 2002: International Teapot Exhibition, Yingge Ceramics Museum, Taipei, Taiwan, Republic of China
- 2000: Color and Fire: Defining Moments in Studio Ceramics, 1950-2000, Los Angeles County Museum of Art, Los Angeles, CA
- 1996: A Madcap Teapot Part at the Renwick, Renwick Gallery of the Smithsonian American Art Museum, Washington, D.C.
- 1989: Exposiçao—Ceramica Na Quinta De San Miguel, Galeria Municipal de Arte, Almada Portugal
- 1986: American Potters Today, Victoria and Albert Museum, London, England
- 1979: Marietta Craft National, Marietta College, Marietta, OH
