= American Museum of Ceramic Art =

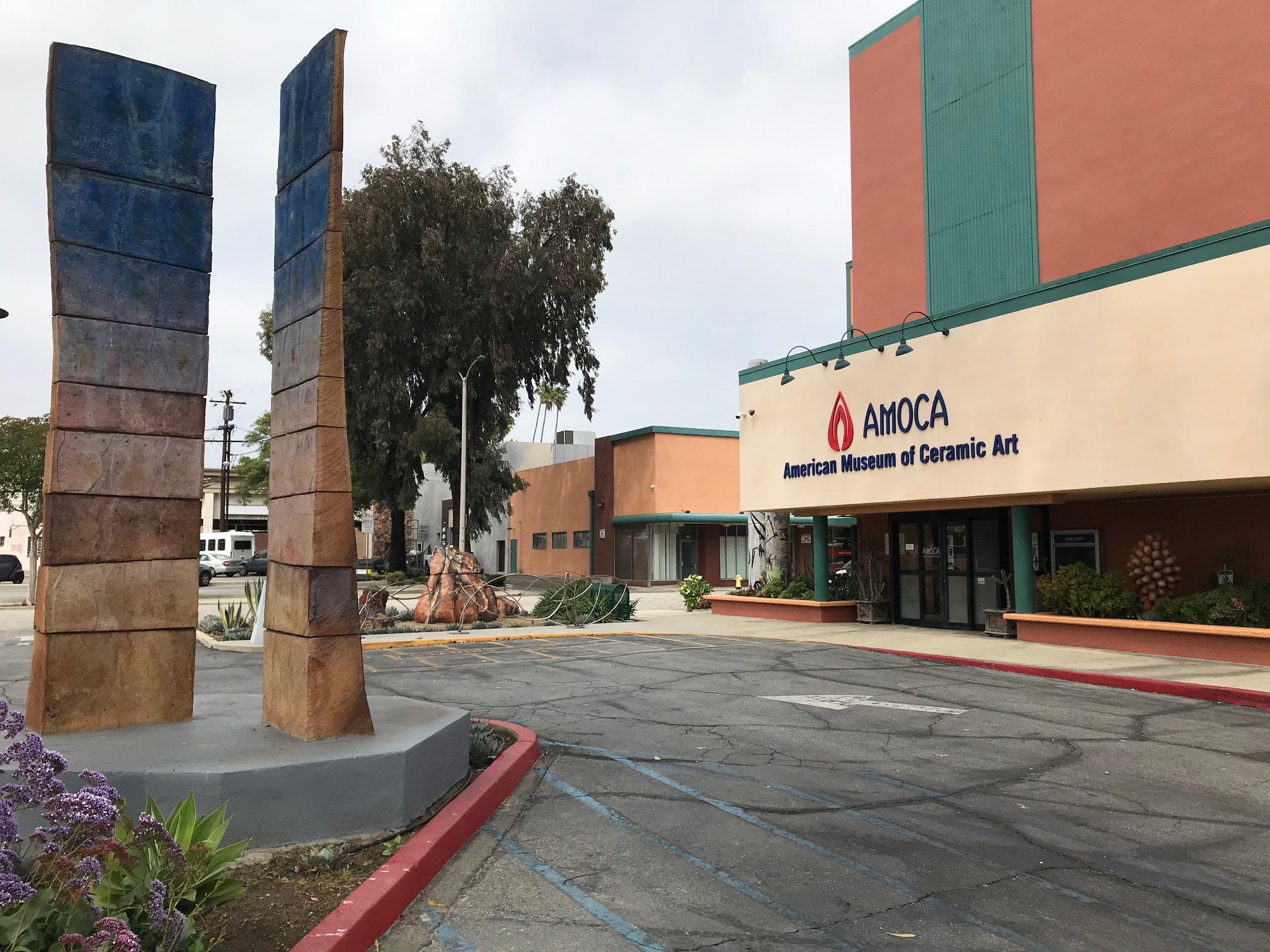
- front entrance of AMOCA
- Established: 2003
- Location: 399 N. Garey Ave; Pomona, California 91767
- Coordinates: 34.0610°N 117.7506°W
- Type: Art Museum
- Collections: Ceramics, Sculpture
- Founder: David Armstrong
- Director: Beth Ann Gerstein
- Architect: Benjamin Hall Anderson
- Public transit access: Pomona–Downtown
- Website: amoca.org

The American Museum of Ceramic Art (AMOCA) is an art museum for ceramic art, located in Pomona, California. Founded in 2003 as a nonprofit organization, the museum exhibits historic and contemporary ceramic artwork from both its permanent collection of 10,000 objects and through temporary rotating exhibitions.

== History ==
The American Museum of Ceramic Art (AMOCA) was founded in Pomona, California in 2003 by David Armstrong, a Pomona businessman and ceramic artist. It is a 501(c)(3) nonprofit organization. The museum was first located in a Pomona storefront. In 2010, Armstrong purchased a two-story building, the former headquarters of Pomona First Federal Savings and Loan, which was designed by Benjamin Hall Anderson in 1956. The Anderson building houses a legacy mural in the interior by the Southern California artist Millard Sheets. The museum was relocated into the larger building in 2011.

In 2014, AMOCA hired Beth Ann Gerstein to serve as the executive director. Gerstein joined AMOCA after a twenty-year tenure at The Society of Arts and Crafts of Boston. Gerstein succeeds founding executive director Christy Johnson who retired in 2013. From 2004 to her retirement in 2013, Johnson facilitated a diverse, five-exhibition-a-year schedule. While at AMOCA, Johnson was involved with the Getty’s Pacific Standard Time initiative, producing a critically acclaimed exhibition, Common Ground: Ceramics in Southern California (1945-1975), and book of the same title.

=== Early formation ===
The museum's founder, David Armstrong, moved to Pomona, California with his family in 1944. His father, David S. Armstrong, opened a furniture and appliance business at 150 East Third Street. Armstrong earned a Bachelor of Arts degree from Pomona College in 1962 and while earning his degree, he also studied with ceramic artist Paul Soldner at nearby Scripps College.

In 1969, Armstrong converted the family furniture business into Armstrong's Gallery which featured limited edition ceramic collectibles and specialized in porcelain figurines and collector plates.

Armstrong began producing porcelain collector plates in the early 1970s. He generated a series of collector plates in collaboration with comedian Red Skelton, who was also a painter known for portraying clowns, in 1975. For 27 years, Armstrong produced and distributed Red's limited edition ceramic collectibles through the use of ceramic decals fired onto porcelain. Armstrong's ceramic products included ceramic baseball cards and plaques, along with elaborate gold borders on collector plates to enhance the artist's design.

In 1993, he earned his Master of Fine Arts degree with a concentration in ceramics from Claremont Graduate School studying with Paul Soldner. Around the year 2000, Armstrong shifted the focus of his gallery towards contemporary studio ceramics. He closed Armstrong's Gallery in 2014 to focus on AMOCA.

== Collections ==
AMOCA's permanent collection consists of more than 10,000 pieces and includes California pottery, Southern California ceramics and dinnerware, Mettlach ceramics, industrial ceramics, factory made ceramics, ancient vessels from the Americas, fine porcelains of Asia and Europe, and functional and sculptural contemporary ceramics.

=== Mettlach collection ===
AMOCA's Mettlach collection was donated by Robert D. and Colette D. Wilson, collectors of Mettlach pieces who grew their holdings over a 30-year period. AMOCA contains a 3,000+ piece Mettlach Collection, one of the largest collections of Mettlach wares (dating from c. 1840–1915) in the world. The museum regularly displays several hundred pieces from the permanent collection in the building's lower level.

Robert Wilson, born in Southern California, started collecting at the age of thirteen from antique shops on Sepulveda Blvd in Los Angeles. At the beginning of WWII Robert Wilson started a Mettlach stein collection. Colette Wilson, raised in Southern California, was instrumental in starting the Royal Worcester collection of ceramics that the pair also donated to AMOCA. The Wilson collection was first exhibited at AMOCA in October 2012. At the opening reception Isabella von Boch, from the family that now manages the Villeroy & Boch, Mettlach Factory, declared that "this was the largest and most comprehensive collection in the world."

=== Panorama of the Pomona Valley mural ===
The building was previously the site of a former bank, Pomona First Federal, that commissioned Millard Sheets along with his frequent collaborator Susan Lautmann Hertel to create a 78-foot mural for the interior. Titled Panorama of the Pomona Valley, the mural (1956, paint on canvas) is part of AMOCA's permanent collection. Sheets and Hertel depicted the history of the valley from the time of Native American inhabitants to the arrival of the railroad and the incorporation of Pomona in 1888. Sheets, an art professor and prolific public muralist, created works for commercial and governmental buildings many in Los Angeles County. Susan Lautmann Hertel, a painter and designer, worked with Sheets at the design firm Millard Sheets Designs, Inc., which she took over following his retirement in the 1970s.

== Exhibitions ==
- Inferno: The Ceramic Art of Paul Soldner. (2004)
- Robert Sperry, Bright Abyss, a retrospective including 90 works of ceramist Robert Sperry. (2008)
- Harrison McIntosh: A Timeless Legacy, a retrospective of Harrison McIntosh. (2009)
- Common Ground: Ceramics in Southern California 1945–1975 as part of Pacific Standard Time, an examination of both the cohesiveness and the diversification found within the Los Angeles-area, post-World War II, clay community. (2011)
- Patti Warashina: Wit and Wisdom, a retrospective of American artist Patti Warashina. (2012)
- ICHEON: Reviving the Korean Ceramics Tradition, an exhibition organized by Icheon, South Korea. With a history of ceramic culture that began over 5,000 years ago, ICHEON presented over 200 objects in the ceramics tradition in Korea from antique techniques to contemporary innovations. (2013)

Other exhibitions have included artwork by Peter Voulkos, Betty Woodman, Beatrice Wood, Chris Gustin, Tim Berg & Rebekah Myers, Lisa Reinertson, Rebekah Bogard, Betty Davenport Ford, Connie Layne, Jamie Bardsley, Don Reitz, Marguerite Wildenhain, Peter Callas, and Viola Frey.

The museum has exhibited objects from Gladding, McBean and Villeroy & Boch.

== Other features ==
=== Ceramics studio ===
AMOCA's 12,000 square foot ceramics studio hosts workshops, lectures, and educational programs for artists in residence, studio artists, students, members of AMOCA and the general public.

The ceramic studio has offered classes to the public since 2011. The 12,000 sq. foot studio currently offers semi-private and private studio rentals for artists with ceramic experience, artists in residence opportunities, and classes and workshops for all levels of experience.

=== Resource library ===
AMOCA received a donation of 3,000 books from Helen and Roger Porter in 2010. The collection focuses on ceramics, including technical handbooks, books on the history of ceramic art, and exhibitions catalogs from international and national exhibitions. The library also includes approximately 4,000 monographs and 2,000 periodicals spanning from 1883 to the present.
