= Susan Peterson =

American artist, ceramics teacher and author (1925–2009)

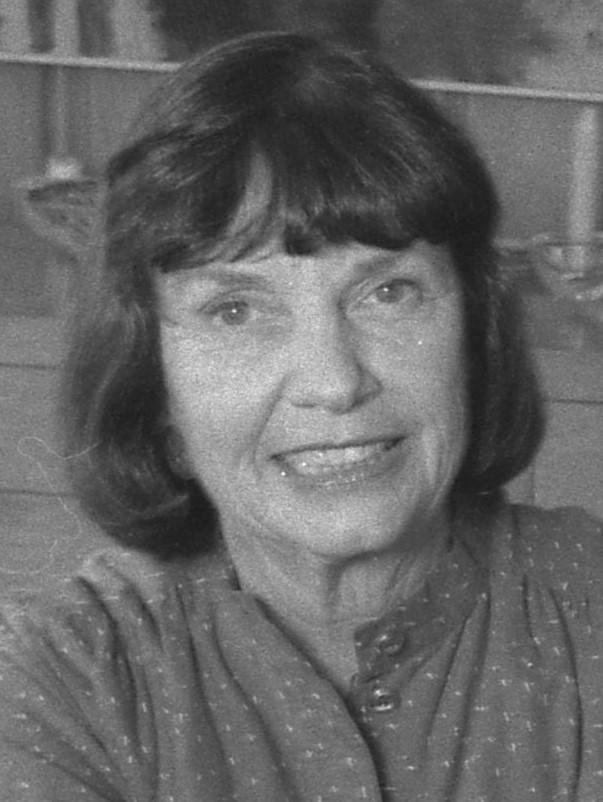
- Peterson in 1984
- Born: Susan Annette Harnly; July 21, 1925; McPherson, Kansas
- Died: March 26, 2009 (aged 83); Scottsdale, Arizona
- Known for: Ceramics
- Spouse: Jack L. Peterson

Susan Harnly Peterson (July 21, 1925, McPherson, Kansas – March 26, 2009, Scottsdale, Arizona) was an American artist, ceramics teacher, author and professor.

== Biography ==
Susan Annette Harnly was born in McPherson, Kansas on July 21, 1925. In 1946 she earned her bachelor's degree at Mills College in Oakland, California. In 1950 she earned a master of fine arts in ceramics at the New York State College of Ceramics at Alfred University.

Peterson established ceramic programs the Wichita Art Association, the Chouinard Art Institute, the University of Southern California, the Idyllwild School of Music and Arts, and Hunter College.

Throughout her career, Peterson traveled across America to lecture about ceramics and its developmental history. She studied ceramic folk art throughout the world. Curious about every aspect of the creative process, she often spent weeks or months observing how an artist lived and worked. Peterson donated her archives and ceramic collection to the Arizona State University Ceramic Research Center.

She was the host of an early educational television series, Wheels, Kilns, and Clay, with 54 episodes that were first broadcast 1964-1965 in Los Angeles by the CBS station KNXT-TV Channel 2. Later, she reworked the series into a 26-week course of study that could be taken via television through USC's College of Continuing Education. It could be completed for credit by watching (an early example of fully distanced learning by media) or for more credit by attending two additional hands-on seminars and passing an exam. The course was broadcast in 1968-69, 1970, and 1972.

Peterson studied Native American pottery and wrote the definitive biography "Lucy M. Lewis; American Indian Potter", in 1984. Her "Pottery by American Indian Women: The Legacy of Generations" was an exhibition catalog for the 1997 show at the National Museum of Women in the Arts in Washington, D.C., that she had also curated.

Peterson's book publications include: "Shōji Hamada: A Potter's Way and Work", "The Craft and Art of Clay", and "The Living Tradition of Maria Martinez". She became head of the ceramics department at USC in the 1950s and spent 23 years teaching there. She also led summer sessions at the university-sponsored Idyllwild School of Music and Arts located in the San Jacinto Mountains. She continued to teach at Hunter College in New York City and retired from working there in 1994.

Peterson died in Scottsdale Arizona on March 26, 2009.
