= Otto Natzler =

Austrian-American ceramicist (1908–2007)

- Gertrud and Otto Natzler
- Born: January 31, 1908; Vienna, Austria
- Died: April 7, 2007 (aged 99); Los Angeles, California, United States
- Occupation: Ceramicist

Otto Natzler (January 31, 1908 – April 7, 2007) was an Austrian–born ceramicist. With his wife Gertrud Natzler, he produced what were considered some of the most admired ceramic pieces of the 20th century.

== Personal life ==
The son of Dr. Sigmund Natzler, a dentist, and a stay-at-home mother Regina Frieda Lowy, Natzler was born in Vienna, Austria and first exposed to art by his uncle. He began his working life at the age of 15 by taking a textile design course and subsequently finding employment devising colour schemes at a local necktie factory, a company that was blacklisted in Nazi Germany and shut down in 1933.

Natzler's first wife was Bertha Steinmetz whom he married on November 9, 1930 in Vienna, Austria. Naztler met his second wife and partner, secretary Gertrud Amon, in 1933, although their romance did not blossom until after he divorced his first wife in 1934. Though they were self-taught, by 1937 they had already begun to submit pieces, winning a silver medal at the Paris Exposition in 1937.

== Work ==
'Footed Vase', glazed ceramic by Otto Natzler, 1981, Smithsonian American Art Museum

1938 marked the beginning of the Naztlers' serious commitment to their craft. After winning the silver medal on March 11 of that year, the couple married in June and fled Vienna for Los Angeles in September, with the help of Otto's cousin. From 1938 to 1971, the year of Gertrud's death, the duo produced an increasingly notable body of work, with Gertrud as the potter and Otto as the glazer. Gertrud's forms were reminiscent of the Vienna Secessionist movement, while Otto perfected over 2,000 colours and styles of glazes. In 1999, Modernism Magazine declared that the Natzlers' work was "among the finest pottery of all time."

== Later life ==
Gertrud died in 1971 and Otto married photographer Gail Reynolds in 1973. Otto initially refused to glaze the last set of pots that Gertrud had thrown, but Reynolds soon convinced him to return to his work. After being described as "vital and active" from a rigorous exercise program well into his 90s, Natzler succumbed to cancer in Los Angeles at the age of 99.

== Collections ==
'Oval Bowl' chartreuse glaze and oxidation-fired earthenware bowl by Otto Natzler and Gertrud Natzler, 1942, Smithsonian American Art Museum

- The Grace Museum, Abilene, Texas
- Cooper-Hewitt Museum
- Everson Museum of Art
- Honolulu Museum of Art
- Kantonales Gewerbemuseum
- Los Angeles County Museum of Art
- Metropolitan Museum of Art
- Museo Internazionale delle Ceramiche
- Museum of Arts and Design
- Museum of Modern Art
- Nelson-Atkins Museum of Art
- Smithsonian American Art Museum
- Victoria and Albert Museum
