= Pacific Clay =

Pacific Clay Products
- Company type: Private
- Founded: 1892
- Headquarters: Lake Elsinore, California, US
- Products: Brick
- Owner: David H. Murdock
- Website: www.pacificclay.com

Pacific Clay Products, founded 1892, was created by the merger of several Southern California potteries in the US. The company began producing utilitarian pottery in the 1920s, and introduced solid color earthenware dinnerware in 1932. The primary site for the production of ceramic tableware, kitchenware, and art ware was based in the company's Lincoln Heights, Los Angeles, plant at 306 West Avenue 26. Pacific Clay ceased production of ceramic dinnerware and art ware in 1942. After 1942, Pacific Clay produced sewer tile and brick. The company ceased production of sewer tile in 1997. The company continues to produce brick products in Lake Elsinore, California. The company has been owned by David H. Murdock since 1973.

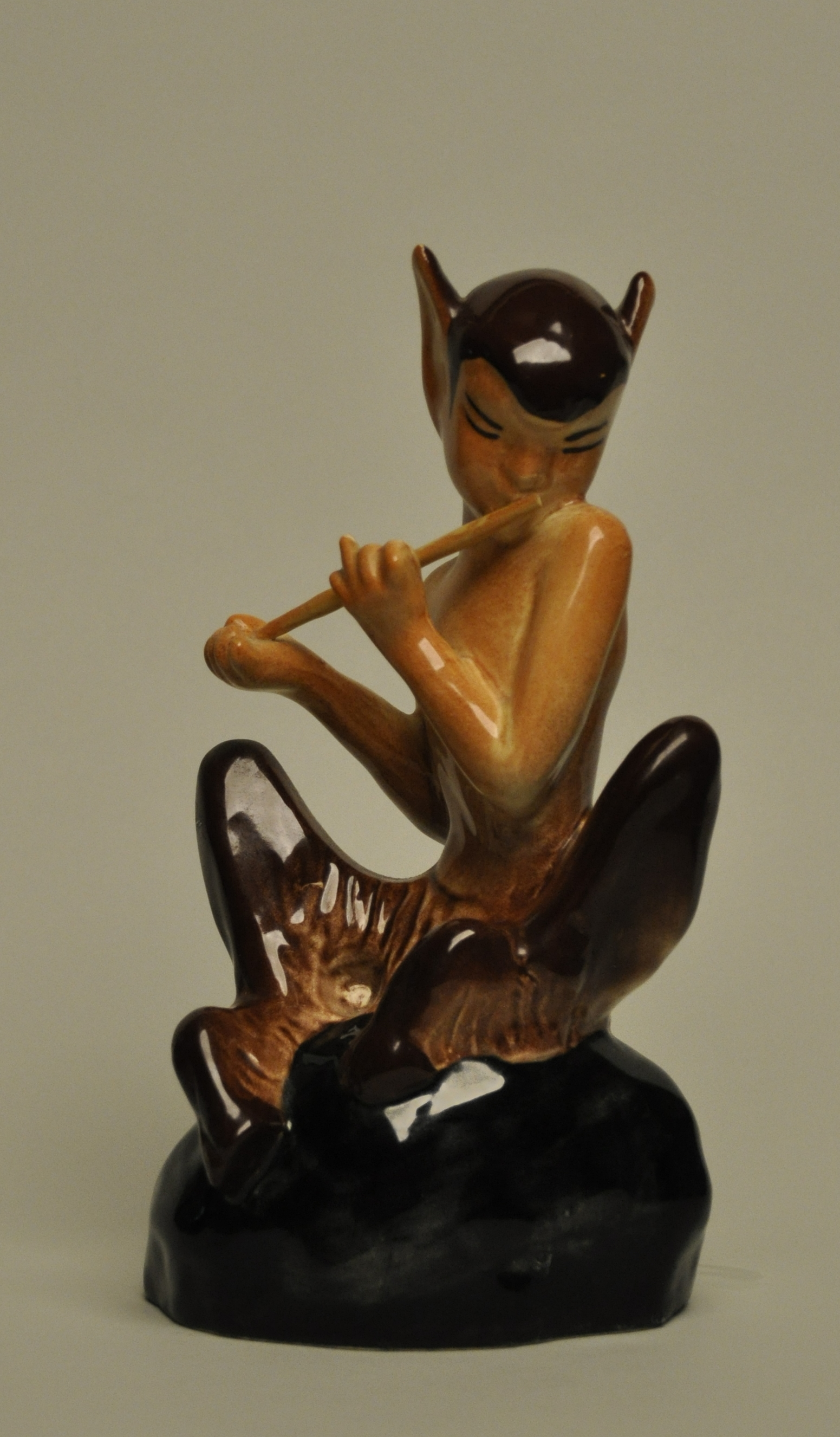
Pacific Pottery Pan figurine

== History ==
Founded in 1892 with the merger of several Southern California companies, Pacific Clay Products was one of the "Big Five" Southern California potteries in the production of ceramic tableware, kitchenware, and art wares from 1930 to 1942. The "Big Five" Southern California potteries were Metlox, Vernon Kilns, Gladding, McBean & Co., J.A. Bauer Pottery, and Pacific Clay Products.

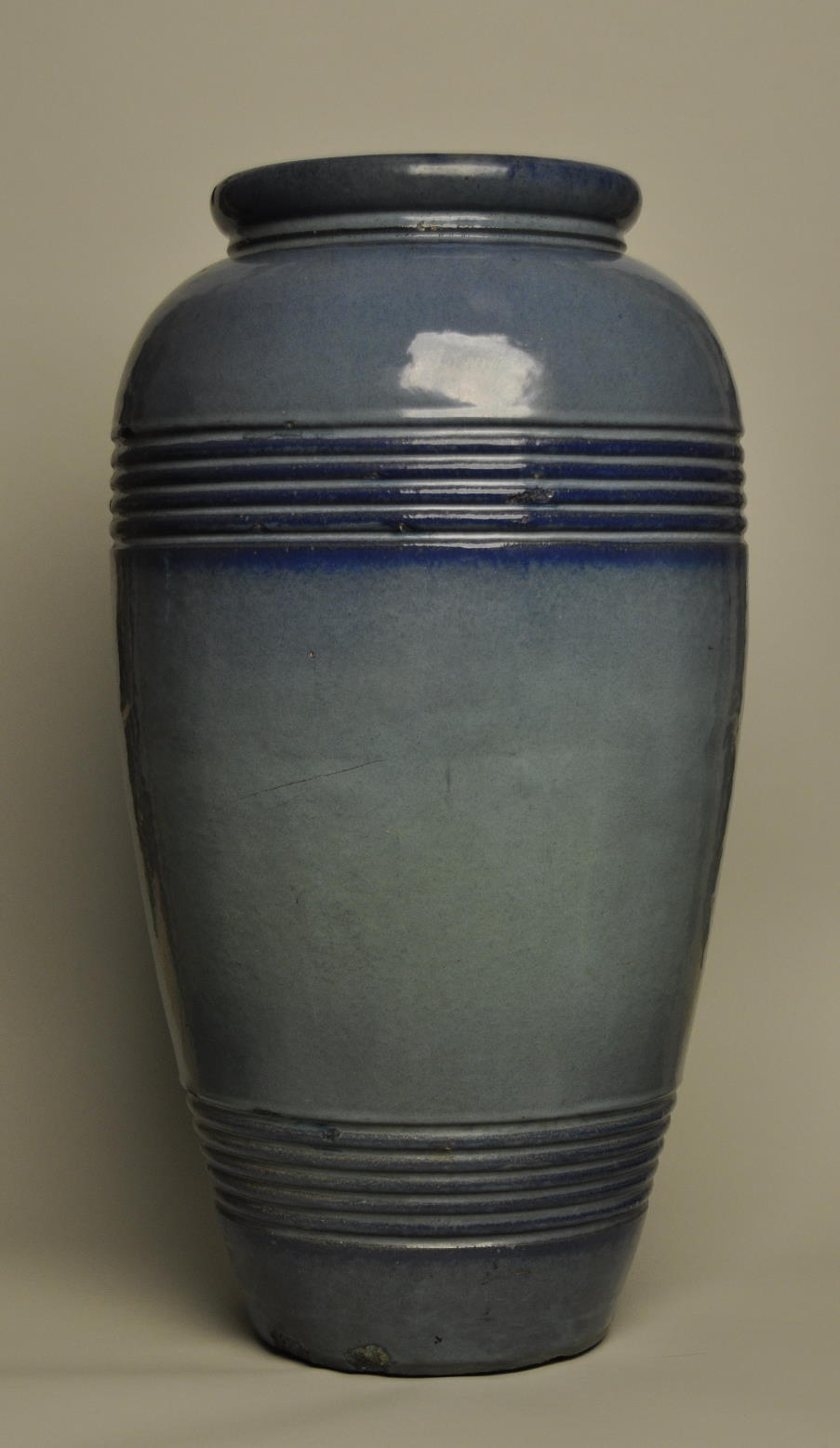
Pacific Pottery oil jar

Early pottery products manufactured in the 1920s were utilitarian ware including bowls, mugs, and poultry feeders. The company also produced hand-thrown vases and garden ware pots. In 1932, Pacific introduced mix and match brightly solid colored tableware and art ware. The solid-colored tableware was sold as "Hostessware." In 1935, Pacific introduced hand-painted patterns on the Hostessware shape in various plaid, floral, and fruit designs. By 1937, Pacific introduced the Coralitos and Arcadia lines, a more delicate earthenware body in solid colors. In 1941, hand-painted patterns on the Coralitos and Arcadia shapes were introduced: Grape, Strawberry, Hibiscus, French Ivy, and Shasta Daisy.

Pacific Clay Products' art ware lines were introduced around 1932. The art ware lines, marketed as Pacific Pottery, included a wide variety of shapes for vases, figurines, flower bowls, candleholders, planters and flower frogs for the retail and florist trade.

In October 1942, all dinnerware and art ware was discontinued due to World War II as the company retooled for the production of war materials for the United States government. Pacific Clay Products never produced tableware or art ware again. Pacific Clay produced sewer pipe until 1997 in Corona, California.

In 1963, Pacific Clay bought the Los Angeles Brick Company in Alberhill, California. In 1973, David H. Murdock bought Pacific Clay and took the company private. In 1996, the company built a new state-of-the-art brick factory and produces brick products.

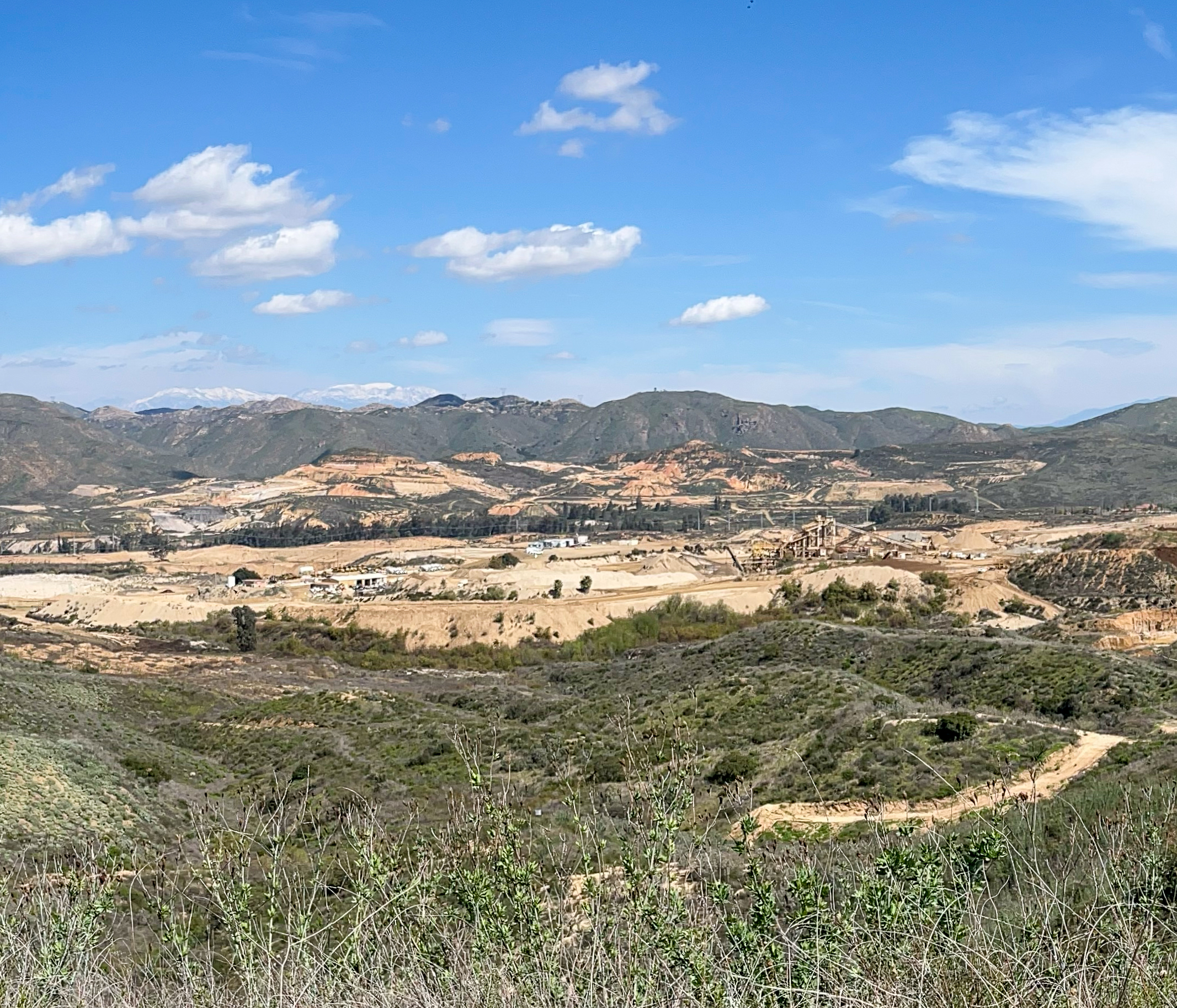
Pacific Clay, Lake Elisnore, California.
