= Gale Turnbull =

Early 20th-century American artist

Daniel Gale Turnbull
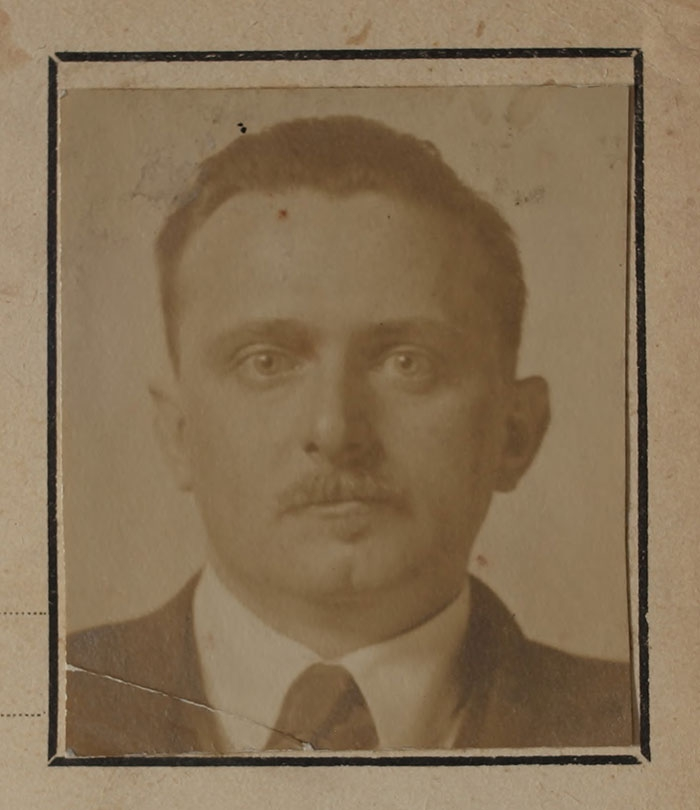
- Turnbull, 1917 (photo by AFS)
- Born: December 19, 1886; Long Island, New York, US
- Died: April 11, 1964 (aged 77); Los Angeles, California, US
- Resting place: Fort Rosecrans National Cemetery, San Diego, California
- Education: Pratt Institute, College of New York
- Known for: Ceramic design, painting, etching, art direction

Daniel Gale Turnbull Jr., was an American ceramicist, painter, etcher, and art director active from the 1920s until the 1950s. He is best known for his work as art director and designer at Vernon Kilns beginning in 1936.

== Personal life ==
Gale Turnbull was born on December 19, 1886. He attended Pratt Institute and the College of New York but left without graduating and moved to France in 1912.

On June 2, 1917, Turnbull joined the American Field Service, indicating on the enlistment form that he was working as an artist at the time. He served as an ambulance driver with the French army for 3 months before leaving to become a sergeant in the United States Army until the end of the war.

Daniel Gale Turnbull died on March 11, 1964, in Los Angeles, California after retiring 6 years prior in 1958. He is buried at the Fort Rosecrans National Cemetery in San Diego, California.

== Artistic career ==
In 1912 he moved to Point Croix to study under Jean-Urbain Guerin, Vojtech Preissig, and Charles A.C. Lasar. He proceeded to spend several years painting around France, chiefly in Paris, Provance, and Normandy, before joining the war effort. While living in France, Turnbull formed the American Painters of Paris alongside Jules Pacsin, O. Chaffee, W. J. Glackens, and F. J. Frieseke. The group regularly corresponded with artists living in America including Rockwell Kent, A. Maurer, and D. Karfunkle, among others.

In France, Turnbull had work exhibited at the Salon d'Automme and Durand Ruel Gallery. In 1926, his oil painting "Les Oliviers" was purchased by the French government for display in the Musee d'art Moderne de Paris.

Turnbull returned to the United States in 1927. He was a member of the American Ceramic Society and worked as the art director at Leigh Potters(Alliance, Ohio) from 1929 to 1931, then as the art director at Sebring Pottery (Sebring, Ohio) from 1931 to 1935, before serving as art director at Vernon Kilns from 1936 until approximately 1942.

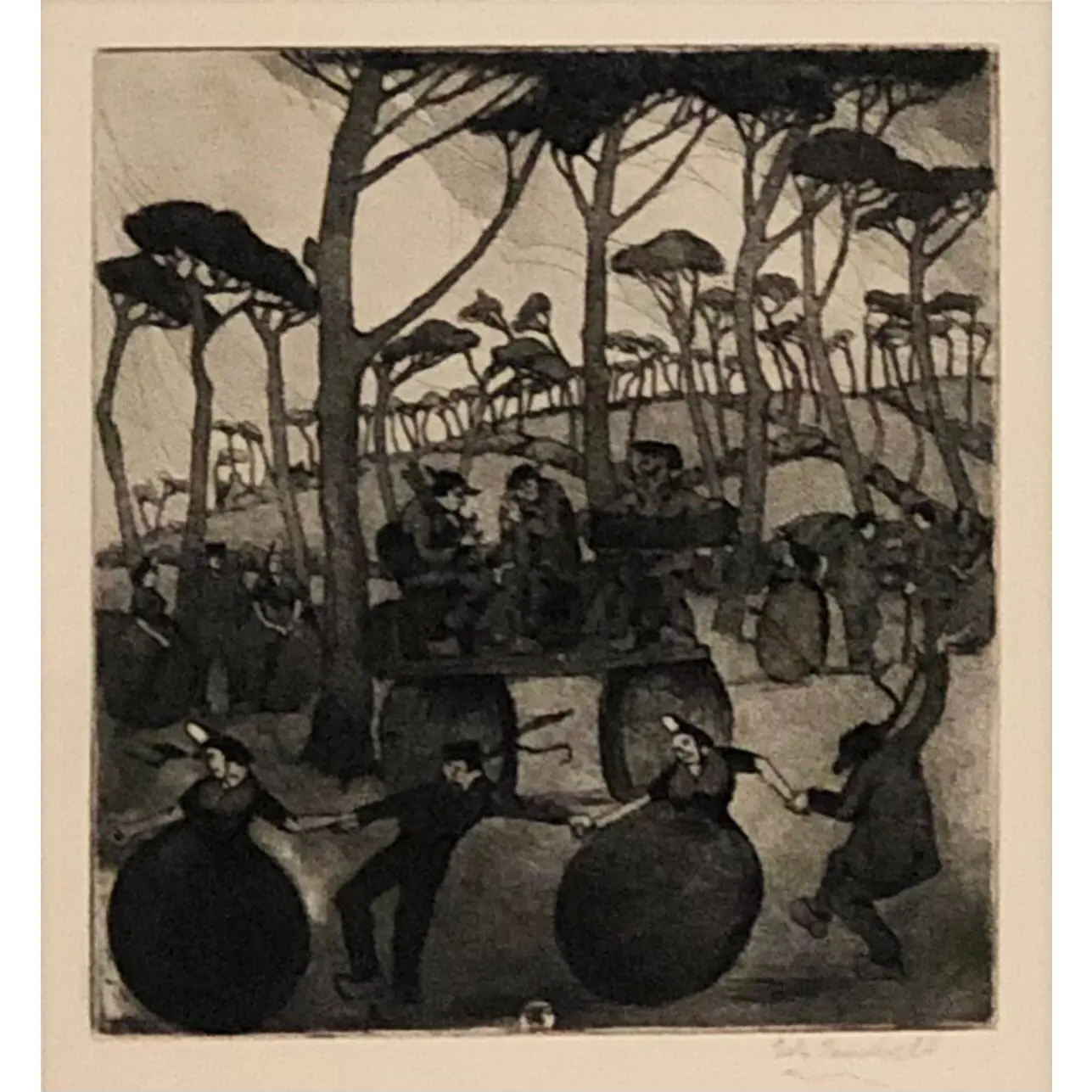
Untitled, Etching, Turnbull, ca. 1920

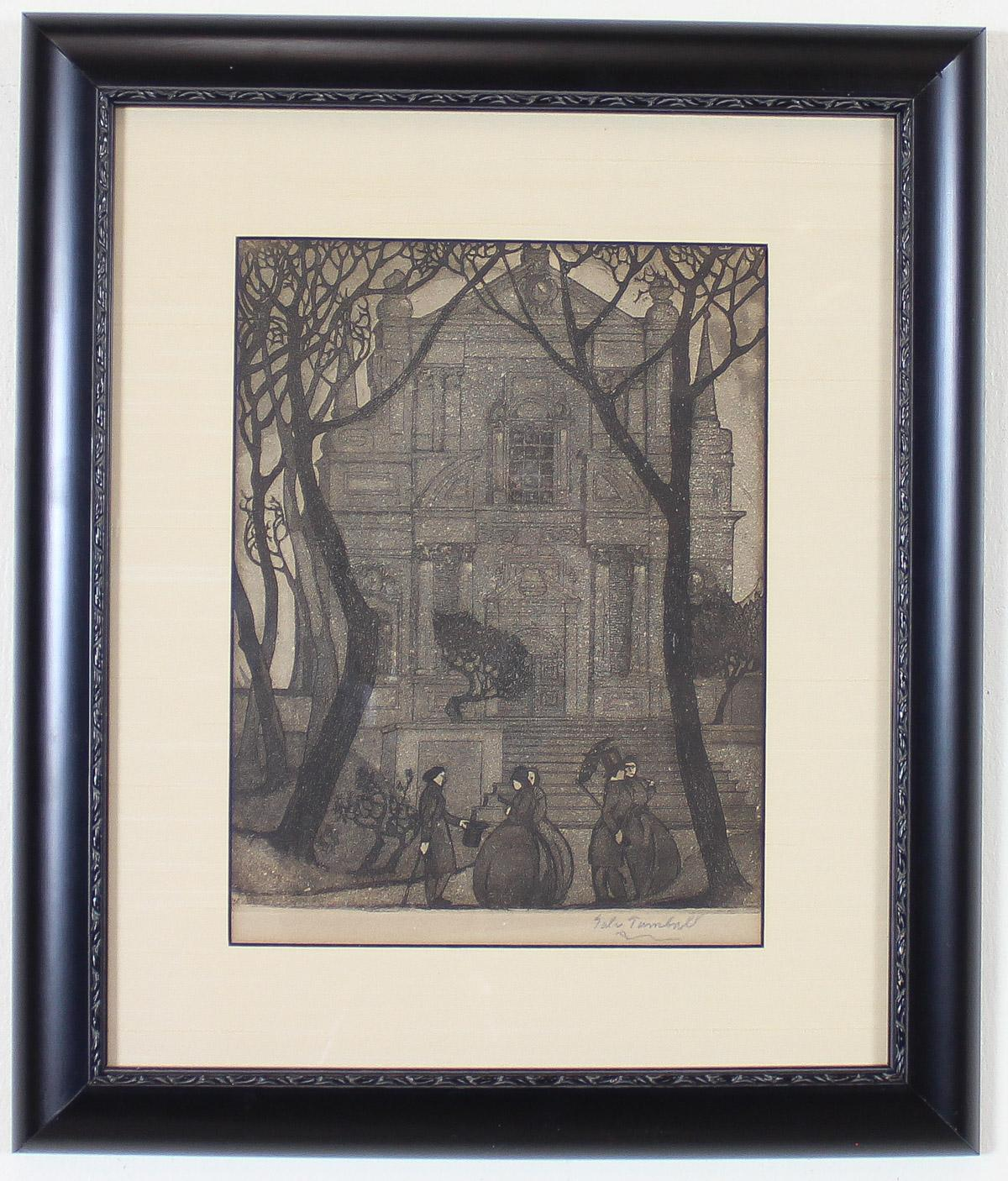
Figures on a Walk, Etching, Turnbull, ca. 1920

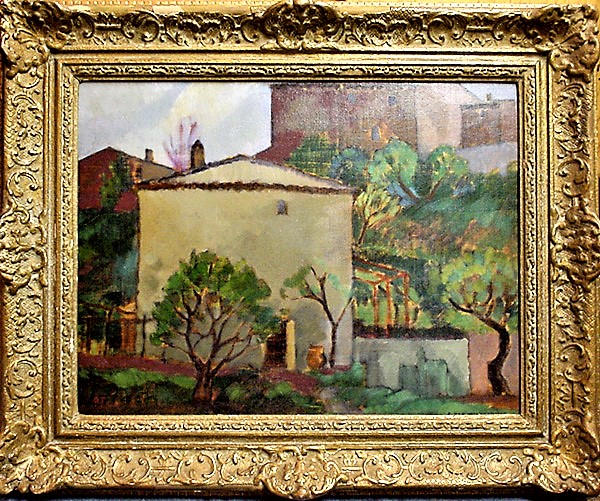
Afternoon in Cagnes, oil painting, Turbull, 1922

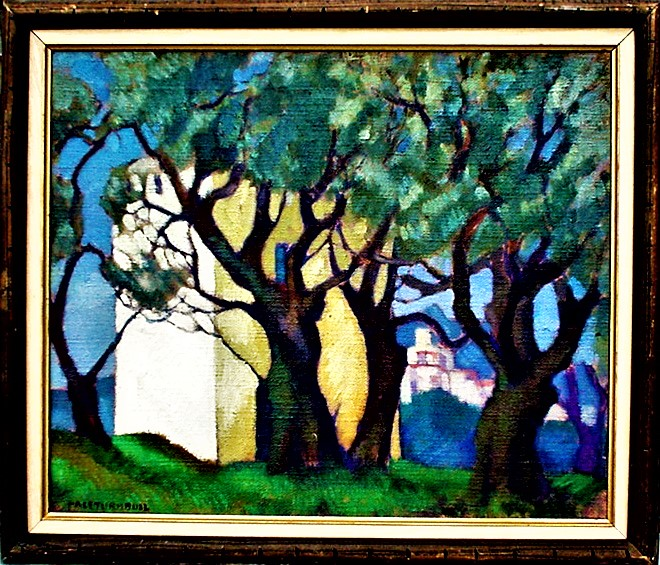
House and Trees, Point Croix, oil painting, Turnbull, ca. 1920

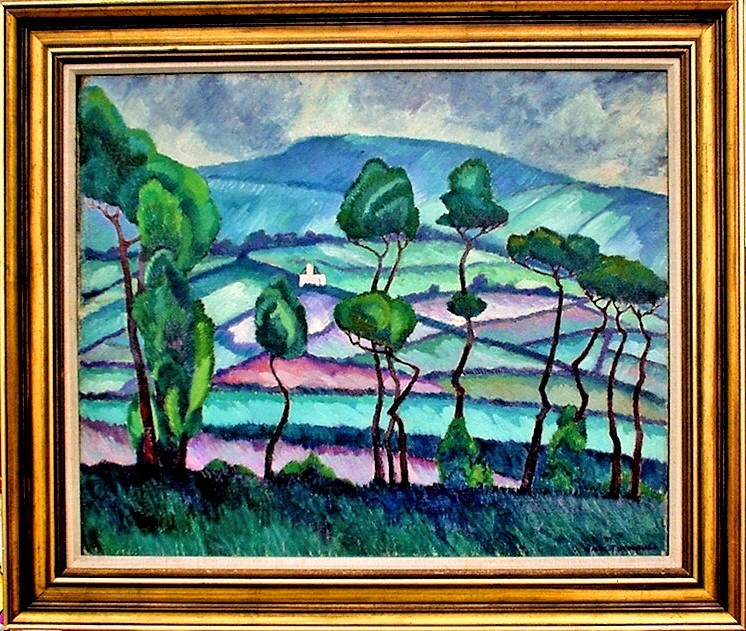
Provance Landscape, oil painting, Turnbull, ca. 1920

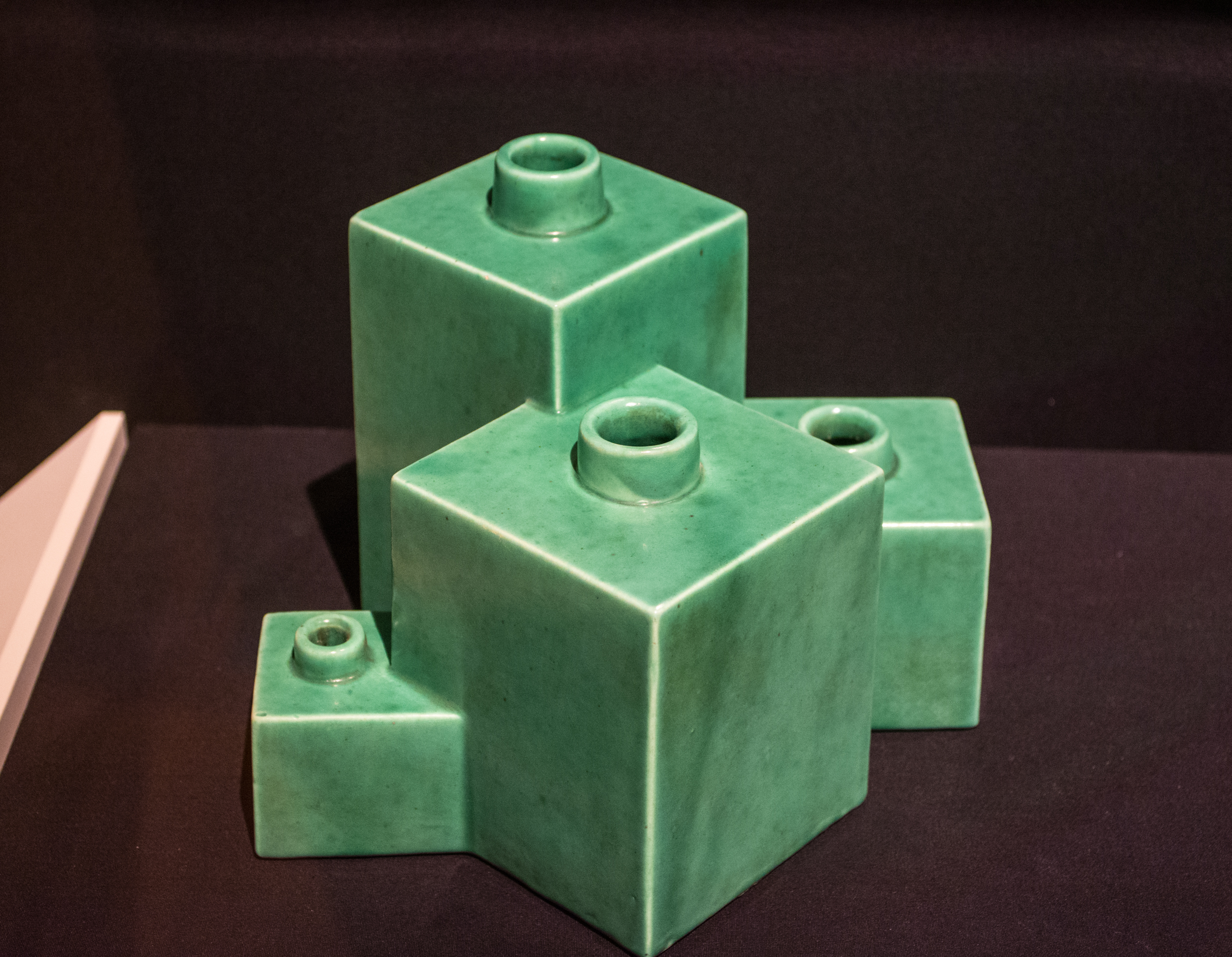
Vase, Turnbull, Sebring Pottery, 1929, Cleveland Museum of Art

=== Collections ===
Gale Turnbull's etchings and watercolor/oil paintings are currently held by Brooklyn Museum, Luxembourg Museum, and private collectors, with his work occasionally appearing at public auctions in the United States. Vernon Kilns pieces attributed to Turnbull by name are held by the International Museum of Dinnerware Design, Dallas Museum of Art, Metropolitan Museum of Art, Birmingham Museum of Art, Cleveland Museum of Art, Portland Museum of Art, Los Angeles County Museum of Art, and Yale University Art Gallery.

== Work at Vernon Kilns ==
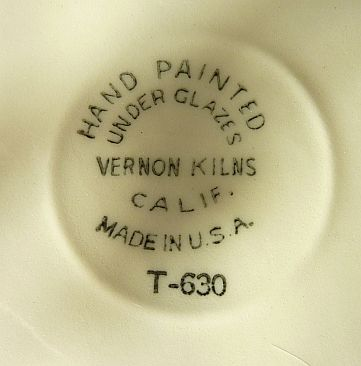
Example of a Vernon Kilns mark featuring a Turnbull pattern number

Vernon Kilns expanded their line of designs and patterns exponentially under the leadership of their first art director, Gale Turnbull. There were so many design variances introduced under Turnbull that all such designs carry a maker's mark featuring a T- followed by a pattern number to indicate their provenance.

=== Ultra ===
Turnbull is credited with designing both Vernon Kilns' Ultra California line as well as the base shape of the Ultra dishes themselves, with Jane Bennison Howell contributing the design of the upside-down handles. The original California line was produced from approximately 1938-1942 and came in six colors: Buttercup (yellow), Aster (blue), Carnation (pink), Gardenia (green), maroon and white, with the latter being the most difficult to source as it was rarely advertised and likely only produced in June for wedding season. Vernon Kilns used the Ultra as the base shape for many future lines, including those created with Rockwell Kent, Don Blanding, and Disney.

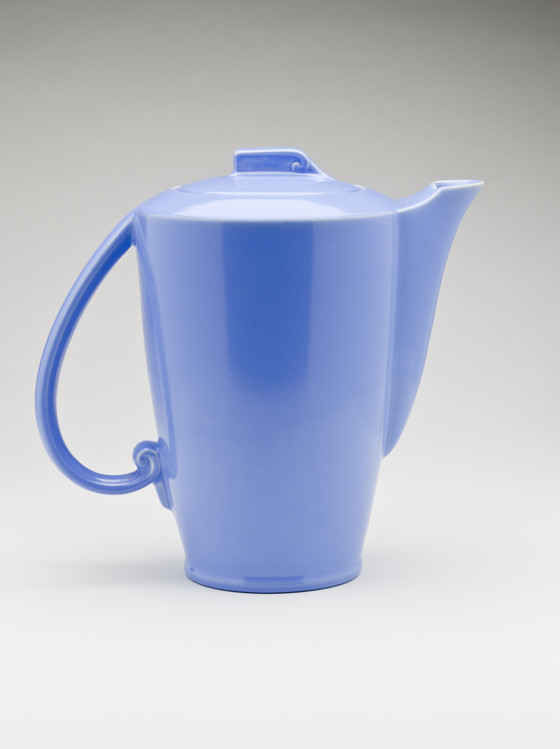
'Ultra California' pitcher, Turnbull, Vernon Kilns, 1938–42, LACMA

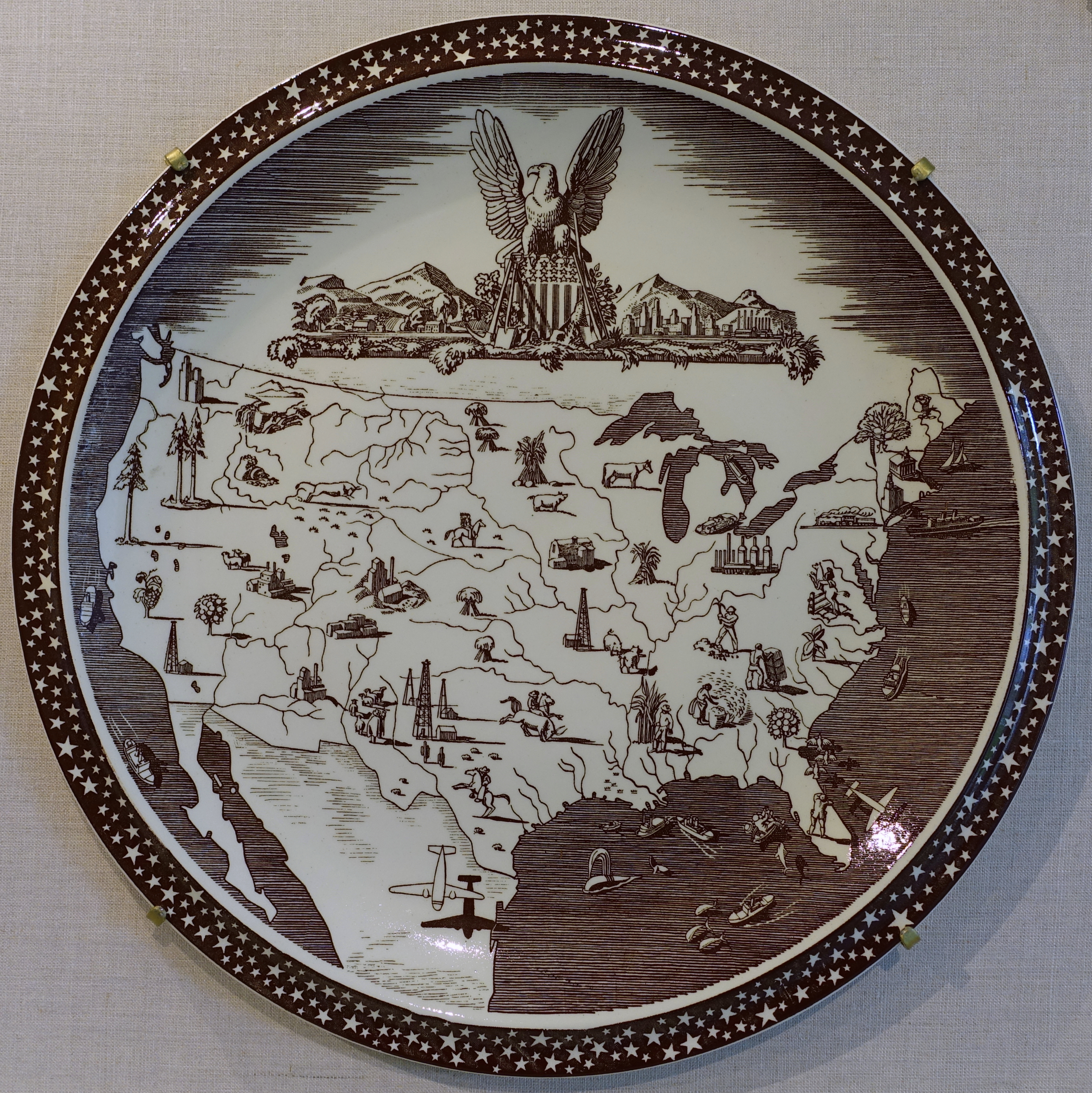
'Our America' plate (Ultra style), Kent, Vernon Kilns, 1938–39, Portland Museum of Art

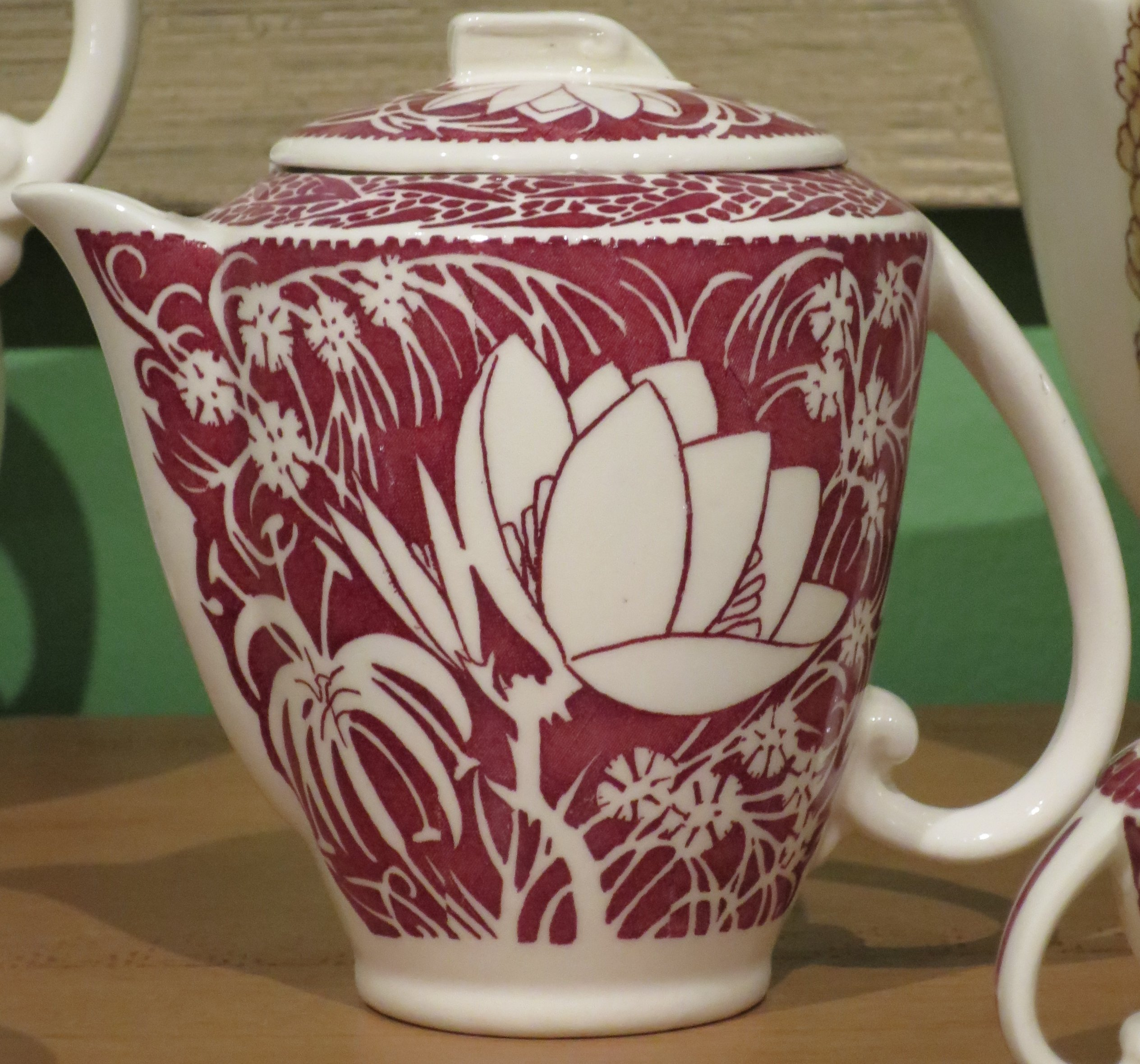
'Hawaiian Flowers' creamer (Ultra style), Blanding, Vernon Kilns, 1938–42

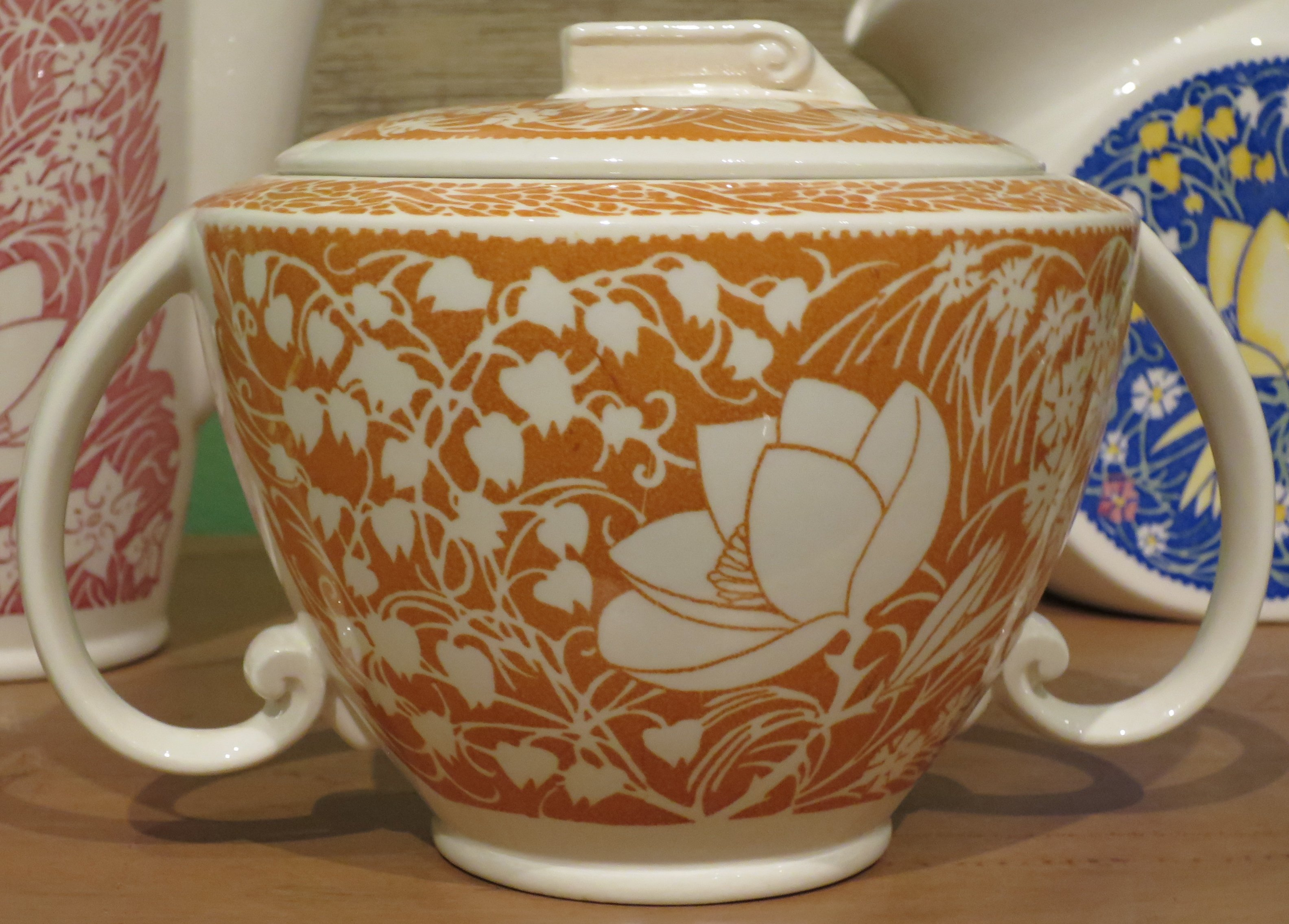
'Hawaiian Flowers' sugar bowl (Ultra style), Blanding, Vernon Kilns, 1938–42

=== Native American Series ===
In 1937, Gale Turnbull designed a set of hand-painted dish-ware titled the "Native American Series" that would become one of his most popular sets. The series featured designs inspired by California-area Native American culture and architecture, with many showcased on Vernon Kilns' Montecito-shape line. Native American Series came in seven smaller pattern sets: Going to Town, Pueblo, Arizona, Mountain Mission, Sentinels, Cabanas Chicos, and Little Mission.

=== Organdie ===
Organdie was the name given to a collection of Turnbull's plaid designs, the first in an eventual range of six plaids offered on dinnerware by Vernon Kilns from 1937 to 1958. The plaid, gingham, and tweed patterns were offered on Vernon Kilns' Montecito-shape line. A 1937 advertisement described it as the "bold, gay patterns of crisp organdie, subdued and mellowed by undertones of contrasting color and design."

Organdie-style Vernonware can occasionally be seen in the background of kitchen scenes of the 2000s American sitcom Rules of Engagement.
