= Vernon Kilns =

American ceramic company

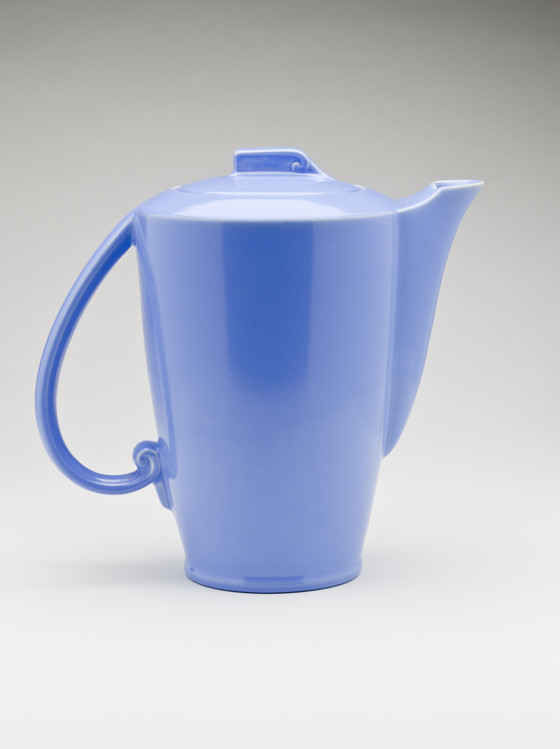
- Vernon Kilns Ultra California pitcher
- Industry: Ceramic manufacturing
- Predecessor: Poxon China
- Founded: 1931
- Founder: Faye G. Bennison
- Defunct: 1958
- Fate: Dissolved
- Headquarters: Vernon, California, United States
- Products: Ceramic art ware and dinnerware

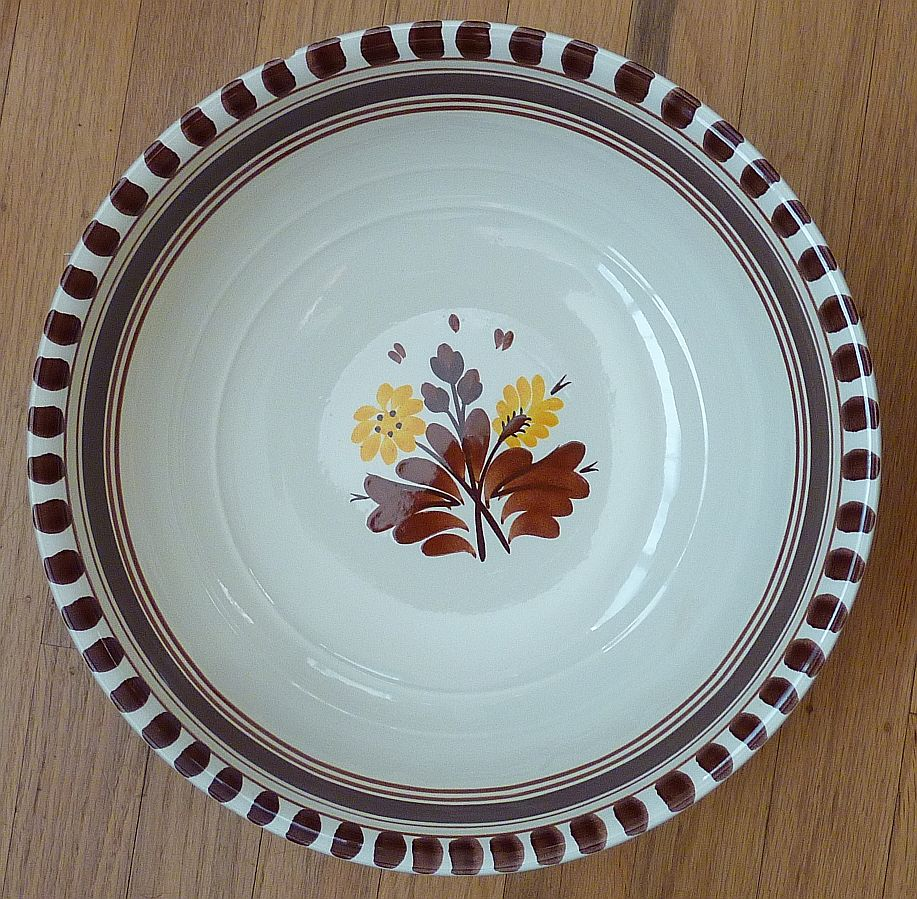
Large bowl manufactured before 1952.

Vernon Kilns was an American ceramic company in Vernon, California, US. In July 1931, Faye G. Bennison purchased the former Poxon China pottery renaming the company Vernon Kilns. Poxon China was located at 2300 East 52nd Street. Vernon produced ceramic tableware, art ware, giftware, and figurines. The company closed its doors in 1958.

Vernon Kilns was one of the "Big Five" California potteries. The other "Big Five" potteries were Metlox Manufacturing Company, Pacific Clay Products, Gladding, McBean & Co., and J.A. Bauer Pottery.

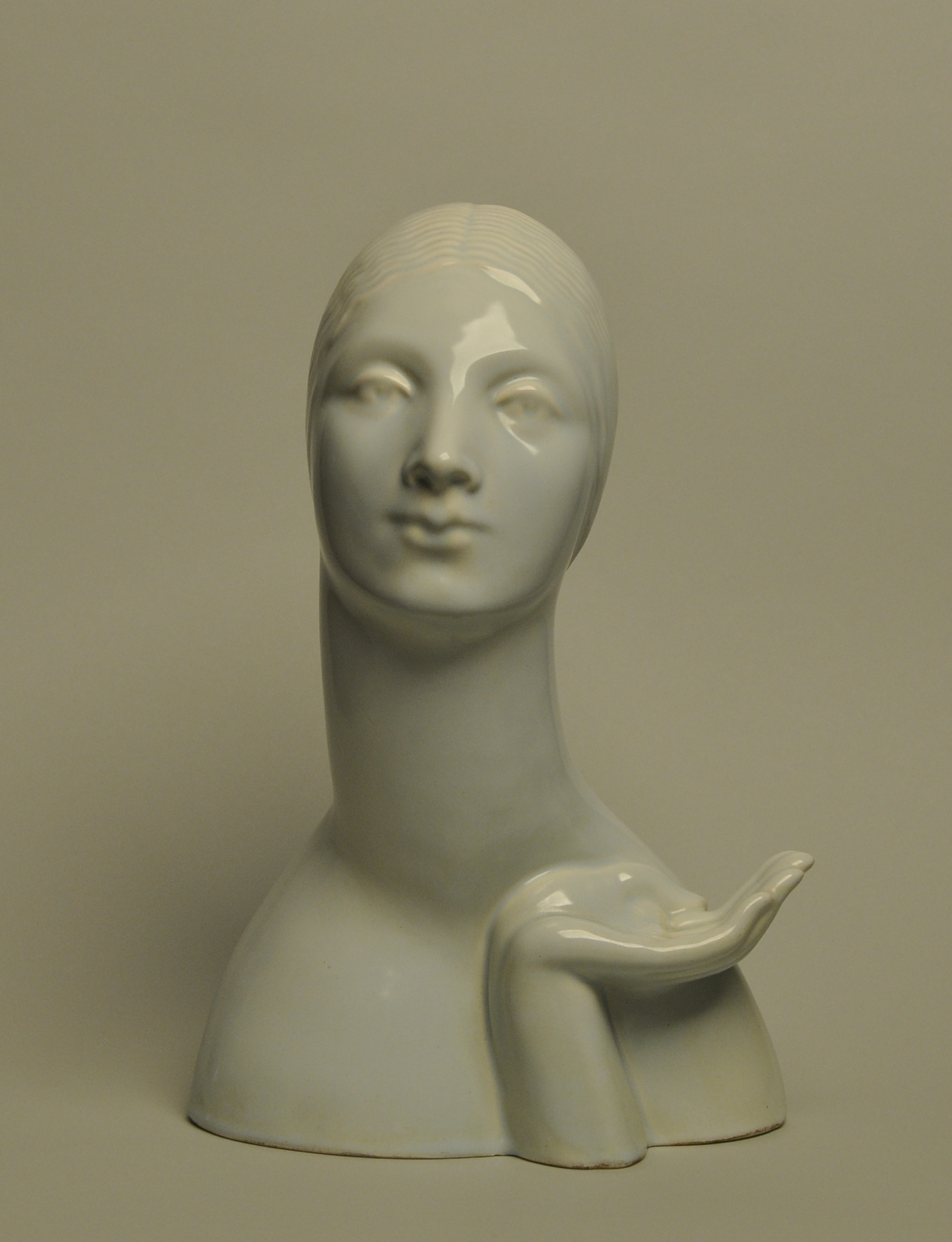
Vernon Kilns, May and Vieve Hamilton art ware

== History ==
After the purchase of Poxon China in 1931, Vernon Kilns, under Faye Bennison's direction, continued to sell and produce Poxon China's patterns, using decals for the surface patterns. Vernon/Poxon pottery is notable for its heavier weight, and features embossed and scalloped rims. Vernon continued to produce a number of original Poxon patterns until 1933 when an earthquake destroyed most of the remaining Vernon/Poxon China ware stock. As a result, Vernon Kilns took the opportunity to create a new set of dinnerware molds: The result was the pottery company's first original dinnerware shape, Montecito. In 1935, Vernon introduced their first solid color dinnerware line, Early California, to complete with the other solid color dinnerware offerings popularized by potteries such as J.A. Bauer Pottery and Pacific Clay Products. In the approximately 15 years that Early California was manufactured, it was produced in 11 high-gloss glazes, including yellow, turquoise, green, brown, dark blue, light blue, ivory, orange, pink, white and maroon.

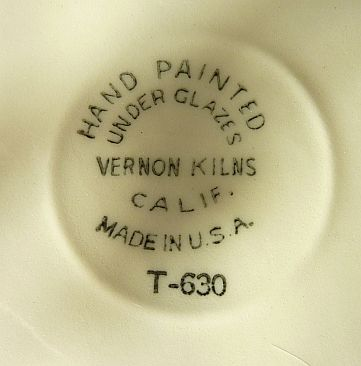
Large bowl with maker's mark.

In the mid-1930s, Vernon established an art ware department, but suspended production of their art ware lines in 1937 due to poor economic conditions. In 1935, Gale Turnbull was hired as the art director, and under the direction of Faye Bennison, hired a series of contract designers and artists to create tableware and art ware. The roster of artists included May & Vieve Hamilton, who joined Vernon from 1936 to 1937 to create a series of vases, figurines, plaques as well as two dinnerware lines: Rippled and Rythmic. Designer Harry Bird came on board during the same period and using his patented “inlaid glaze” process, produced a variety of decorated dinnerware patterns in animal, floral and bird motifs on the Montecito shape. Jane Bennison, daughter of Faye Bennison, worked summers at the pottery and contributed art ware designs, and is credited with the design of the distinctive upside-down handle on the Ultra dinnerware shape of the 1940s.

Vernon continued to hire well-known artists to create new dinnerware patterns. Rockwell Kent designed three dinnerware sets based on his famous woodcuts: Salamina, Moby Dick, & Our America. Don Blanding, a Hawaiian poet and illustrator designed four basic tropical design patterns for tableware. Vernon Kilns signed a contract in 1940 with Walt Disney Productions to make figurines based on Walt Disney's films: Fantasia, Dumbo, and The Reluctant Dragon. Vernon also manufactured art ware based on the film Fantasia.

Janice Pettee sculpted and designed a series of celebrity figurines including Sally Rand Paulette Goddard, Madeleine Carroll, Anne Shirley, Wallace Beery, Robert Preston, Lynne Overman, Victor McLaglen, Evelyn Venable, Gary Cooper, Preston Foster, Walter Hampden, Dorothy Lamour, and Bette Davis.

Prior to World War II, Vernon Kilns ceased production of art ware, however continued to manufacture dinnerware and specialty ware. During the war, Vernon created a new set of English-style dinnerware molds and patterns to meet the demands of consumers who could no longer purchase imported dinnerware. This shape, known as Melinda, featured an embossed rope motif and was decorated in approximately 24 different patterns between 1942 and 1955.

In April 1946, a fire in a drying room destroyed most of the pottery plant including much of their manufacturing equipment. Vernon quickly rebuilt, but the company suffered another devastating fire in 1947. They rebuilt their manufacturing facility again, taking the opportunity to modernize. The old beehive kilns were replaced with modern tunnel kilns that dramatically increased production capacity.

Vernon Kilns produced transfer-print specialty ware that could be special ordered. Custom decal plates, as special order items, were produced for department stores, for promotional advertisement, for commemorative events, and for the tourist trade.

In 1952, Elliot House was hired as art director and continued to work with outside contract artists and designers such as Jean Goodwin Ames and Sharon Merrill. In 1955, Faye Bennison retired. By 1958, Vernon Kilns and several other potteries, including Santa Anita Pottery and Brock Pottery, closed their businesses due to mounting labor costs and competition from foreign imports. Metlox Manufacturing Company, Manhattan Beach, California, bought the molds and continued to manufacture some of Vernon's patterns in their Vernonware division.
