= Grace Tower Warren =

American journalist

- Born: May 1, 1878; Sunderland, Massachusetts, U.S.
- Died: January 1, 1971 (aged 92); Honolulu, Hawai'i, U.S.
- Occupations: Journalist, columnist
- Known for: Lei Day

Grace Hortense Tower Warren (May 1, 1878 – January 1, 1971) was an American journalist, literary hostess, and newspaper columnist based in Hawai'i. She is credited as co-founder of Lei Day, and as originator of the annual event's slogan, "May Day is Lei Day".

== Early life and education ==
Tower was born in Sunderland, Massachusetts, and raised in Pasadena, California, the daughter of George Hammond Tower and Frances Elizabeth Farrar Tower. The family moved to Southern California for George Tower's health, but he died when Grace Tower was a young girl. She graduated from Pasadena High School in 1896, and took extension classes at the University of Hawai'i when her children were young.

== Career ==
Tower was a reporter and society editor at the Pasadena Evening News after high school. She was a reporter in Honolulu beginning in 1909; she reported on the funeral of Queen Lilil'uokalani in 1917. In 1926 Warren attended the Press Congress of the World in Geneva. In 1928, she and her Honolulu Star-Bulletin colleague, poet Don Blanding, created Lei Day, an annual Hawai'ian event. Warren invented the day's slogan, "May Day is Lei Day". In the 1930s she hosted events in her home to honor women writers visiting Hawai'i, including Dorothy Dix, Zona Gale, Fannie Hurst, and Sara Lockwood Williams. She wrote columns and articles for the Honolulu Star-Bulletin into the 1950s.

Warren was an organizer and president of the Honolulu Press Club, president of the Aloha Alumnae chapter of Theta Sigma Phi, and a member of the National League of American Pen Women.

== Publications ==
- "At the Crossroads of the Pacific"/"Honolulu Correspondent in Venice" (1924–1926; her column in Saturday Night magazine)
- "Kamaaina Kolumn" (her column for the Honolulu Star-Bulletin)
- "The Spicebox" (her recipe column for the Honolulu Star-Bulletin)

== Personal life ==
Tower married businessman John Trenholm Warren in 1909. They had two daughters, Katherine and Marion. Her husband died in 1967, and Warren died in 1971, at the age of 92, in Honolulu. Lei Day is still celebrated each year with festivals, concerts, and sales in Honolulu.
