= Solomon Marcus Schiller-Szinessy =

Hungarian rabbi (1820–1890)

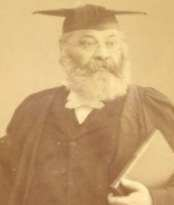
The Reverend Dr. Schiller-Szinessy, 1888 in Cambridge

Solomon Marcus Schiller-Szinessy, sometimes Solomon Mayer Schiller-Szinessy (23 December 1820, Budapest, Hungary - 11 March 1890, Cambridge) was a Hungarian rabbi and academic. He became the first Jewish Reader in Talmudic and Rabbinic Literature at the University of Cambridge.

== Life ==
He graduated as doctor of philosophy and mathematics from the University of Jena, being subsequently ordained as a rabbi. He was next appointed assistant professor at the Lutheran College of Eperies, Hungary.

During the great upheaval of 1848 he supported the revolutionists in the war between Hungary and Austria, and it was he who executed the order of General Torök to blow up the bridge at Szeged, by which act the advance of the Austrian army was checked. Wounded and taken prisoner, he was confined in a fortress, from which he managed to escape the night before his intended execution. Fleeing to Trieste, he took passage for Ireland and landed at Cork, proceeding thence to Dublin, where he preached by invitation of the congregation. He then went to London, and subsequently was elected minister of the United Congregation at Manchester. This was before the secession which led to the establishment of a Reform congregation in that city.

Chiefly owing to Tobias Theodores (professor of Hebrew at Owens College), Schiller-Szinessy was offered and he accepted the office of minister to the newly formed congregation.

He married Georgiana Eleanor Herbert (1831-1901), who converted to Judaism and took the name Sarah. Their first-born child was Alfred Solomon (born 1863), who, like his father, started as an academic but disappeared and probably died during World War I as war-correspondent, leaving a widow and daughter, Ella Regina (1893-1984), in Hamburg. Subsequent children included Theresa Antonia (1864-1865), Eleanor Amalia (1867-1922), Henrietta Georgiana (1869-1939), and Sydney Herbert (1876-1964).

From his position in Manchester he resigned in 1863 and went to Cambridge, where he engaged in teaching, and likewise undertook to examine the Hebrew manuscripts in the Cambridge University Library. The fruit of his labors in the latter direction was his "Catalogue of the Hebrew Manuscripts Preserved in the University Library, Cambridge," Cambridge, 1876. In 1866 he was appointed teacher of Talmud and rabbinical literature, and subsequently reader in rabbinics. In recognition of his services the university conferred upon him the degree of M.A. in 1877. He was the first Jew in either Oxford or Cambridge to be placed on the Electoral Roll.

Among Schiller-Szinessy's contributions to literature may be mentioned an edition of David Ḳimḥi's commentary on the Psalms, book i., and "Massa ba'Arab," Romanelli's travels in Morocco toward the end of the eighteenth century.

His burial place is in Ipswich, Suffolk, in the "Old Jewish Cemetery".
