= Joseph Scott (attorney) =

American lawyer

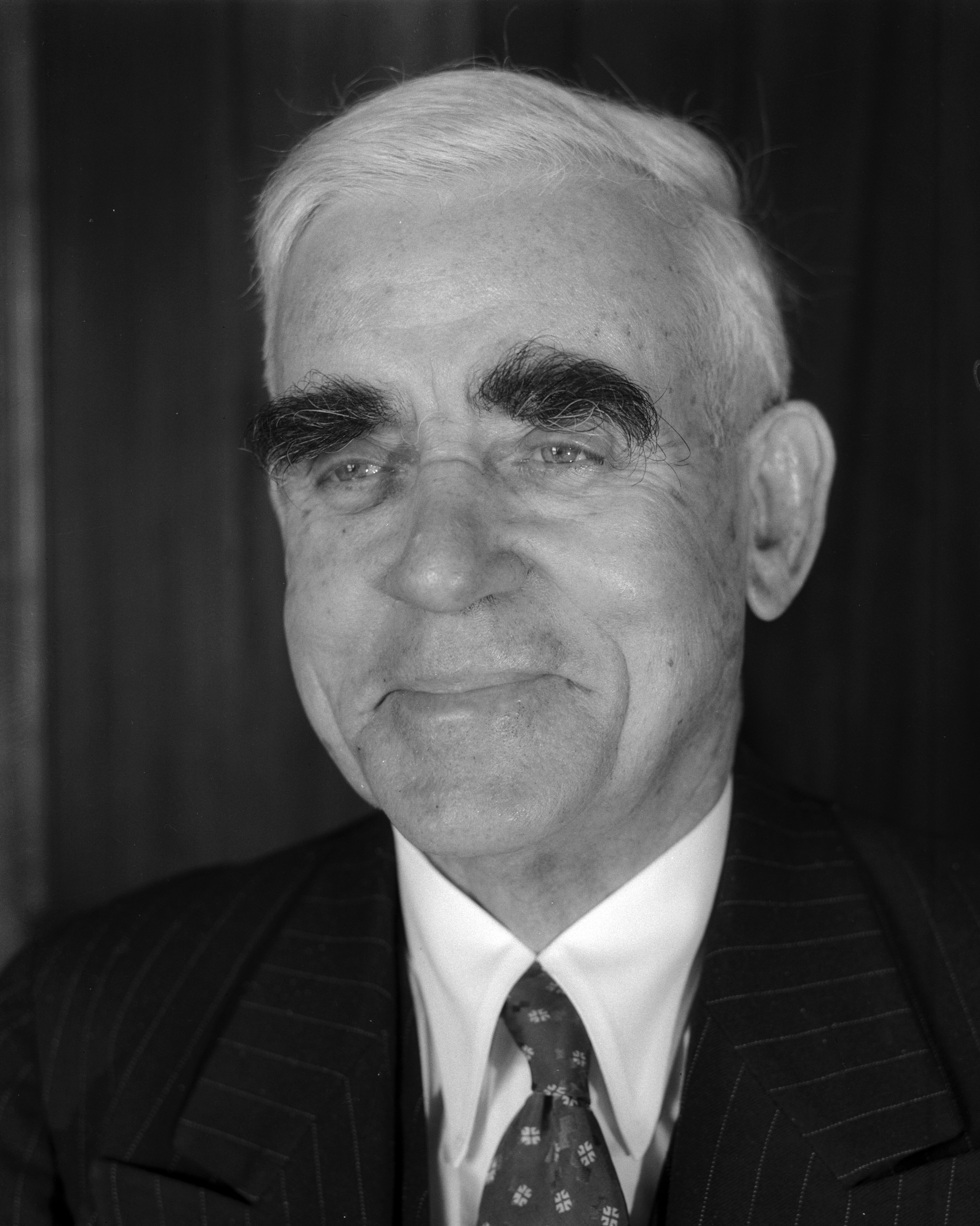
Joseph Scott, c. 1935

Joseph Scott (July 16, 1867 – March 24, 1958) was a prominent British-born attorney and community leader in Los Angeles, California. His service to the community was so varied and important that he earned the nickname "Mr. Los Angeles."

== Early life ==
Scott was born in Penrith, Cumberland, England, in 1867. His father, Joseph, was a Scottish Presbyterian and his mother Mary (née Donnelly) was an Irish Catholic, but young Joseph was raised Catholic. His father was tolerant and quiet, while his mother instilled a sense of respect and hard work in him.

He attended Ushaw College, a seminary in Durham, County Durham, England, that trained Catholic priests and educated lay boys. He attended and graduated from the University of London.

== Emigration to the U.S. ==
Feeling he would be discriminated against in England because of his Catholicism, Scott emigrated to the United States in 1889. He worked in a paper mill in Massachusetts before being appointed a professor of rhetoric and English literature at St. Bonaventure College in Olean, New York. While teaching at the university, he received his A.M. degree in 1893. He moved to Los Angeles that year, and was admitted to the bar. His studies at St. Bonaventure continued, and he was awarded an LL.D. in 1914.

He wed the former Bertha Roth in 1898. The couple had 11 children. His son A. A. Scott became a superior court judge in Los Angeles County, and his son George Scott was ordained a Catholic priest. His grandson, Father Al Scott, is a Catholic priest in Long Beach.

== Career in Los Angeles ==
While practicing law in Los Angeles, Scott became deeply involved in civic affairs. In 1888 he co-founded the Los Angeles Chamber of Commerce. He was the organization's director from 1907 to 1918, and served as its president from 1910 to 1921. In 1902, he was named a member of the Charter Revision Committee which conducted the first significant reform of Los Angeles city government. The same year, he co-founded the Southern California chapter of the Knights of Columbus. He was elected to the Los Angeles City School District in 1906 and served for 10 years—the first five as president.

In 1907, he funded the Southwest Museum. He remained on its board of trustees until 1957.

In 1911, he helped defend union members John J. and James B. McNamara after they were charged with bombing the Los Angeles Times building and causing the deaths of 21 people. The McNamaras eventually confessed: John went to prison for life, and James served a 10-year sentence. For daring to defend the brothers, Times publisher Harrison Gray Otis (a virulent opponent of labor unions) attacked Scott in the paper's pages for the next several years. In 1913, Scott sued Otis, the Times, and the Times-Mirror Company for libel. After three separate trials, Scott won judgments of nearly $70,000.

In 1915, Scott was appointed vice-president of the Panama–California Exposition.

Scott was a lifelong Republican. Nevertheless, in 1917 President Woodrow Wilson named him chairman of the Los Angeles draft exemption board, a post which he held for the duration of World War I. Scott nominated Herbert Hoover for reelection as president at the 1932 Republican National Convention.

At the age of 62, he was elected president of the Los Angeles Community Chest. In 1932, he helped raise a record $3.1 million (about $47.1 million in 2007 dollars) for the organization. He served for four years, and resigned in 1935. After his resignation, he was elected president of the California Conference of Social Work and served one two-year term.

Scott momentarily rose to national prominence in 1945 in the Charlie Chaplin-Joan Barry paternity suit. The 23-year-old actress and one-time Chaplin protégée, Barry, had had an affair with the actor in 1942. Barry became pregnant, and sued Chaplin for child support in 1943. Barry hired Scott to press her case in court. Scott convinced the court to rule a blood test inadmissible as evidence, even though the test seemed to indicate that Chaplin was not the father. At trial, Scott railed against the actor—who had a lengthy and public history of adulterous relationships and affairs with very young women. Among other things, Scott called Chaplin a "pestiferous, lecherous hound", "a little runt of a Svengali", a "cheap Cockney cad", "a hoary headed old buzzard" and "a master mechanic in the art of seduction". Chaplin lost the suit.

Veteran court attaches commented that Scott was the most aggressive lawyer they ever heard bellowing patriotism-above-the-facts in a court case. He claimed Chaplin was a Communist since he had urged the opening of a second front in Europe during World War II, since the fate of the world hinged on Germany being defeated by Russia (the United States was not at war at the time Chaplin said this). Scott persisted in this claim although the United States did enter the war on the side of Russia. At least one law review deplored the course the court took in this case, likely leading to a change in the law, specifically the California Code of Civil Procedure, in 1965.

After World War II, Scott became a charter member of the Los Angeles chapter of the National Conference of Christians and Jews.

== Death ==
Scott suffered a fall in the spring of 1957 which caused a cerebral hemorrhage. He was discharged ten days later. On July 16, he celebrated his 90th birthday with 1,000 well-wishers at the Biltmore Bowl at the Biltmore Hotel. However, he remained in frail condition and continued to seek medical treatment throughout the remainder of the year.

Scott collapsed and fell again in his law office on March 14, 1958, and was rushed to the hospital. He died on March 24, with his son George at his side. The cause of death was uremia. His wife and six of his children survived him.

His body lay in state in Los Angeles City Hall for three days. Vice President Richard Nixon issued official condolences. A requiem Mass was celebrated by his son, George, at the Cathedral of Saint Vibiana, which was attended by 1,250 people. Cardinal McIntyre presided at the funeral, and Bishop Joseph Thomas McGucken gave the eulogy. Among the church leaders attending the funeral were two Auxiliary Bishops of Los Angeles, the Auxiliary Bishop of Fresno, the Bishop of San Diego, and the retired Bishop of Colón, Panama. Among the political leaders in attendance were Governor Goodwin Knight, Associate Justice of the Supreme Court of California Marshall F. McComb, and Irish Ambassador to the United States John Joseph Hearne. He was interred in Calvary Mausoleum.

== Catholic work ==
Scott was a dedicated and lifelong Catholic. He was an international commissioner for overseas work for the Knights of Columbus in 1918, and made nationwide speaking tours on behalf of the organization from the 1920s to the 1950s.

His extensive knowledge of Catholic theology led to his appointment as a speaker at the International Eucharistic Congresses in 1926, 1936, 1937 and 1938.

Pope Benedict XV elevated him to a Knight Commander of St. Gregory, with diplomatic star. Pope Pius XI elevated him to a Knight of St. Gregory. He was appointed a Privy Chamberlain of the Sword and Cape by Pope Pius XII.

== Irish nationalism ==
Scott was a strong supporter of Irish nationalism and a united Ireland. He was a founding member of the American League for an Undivided Ireland in 1947, and served a term as its president. He also served as permanent chairman of the International Irish Congress.

He received the Gold Medal from the American Irish Historical Society in 1948, the organization's highest honor.

Scott was a past president of Los Angeles Division 1 of the Ancient Order of Hibernians. At the time of his death, he was the chapter's oldest living member.

== Honors and popular culture references ==
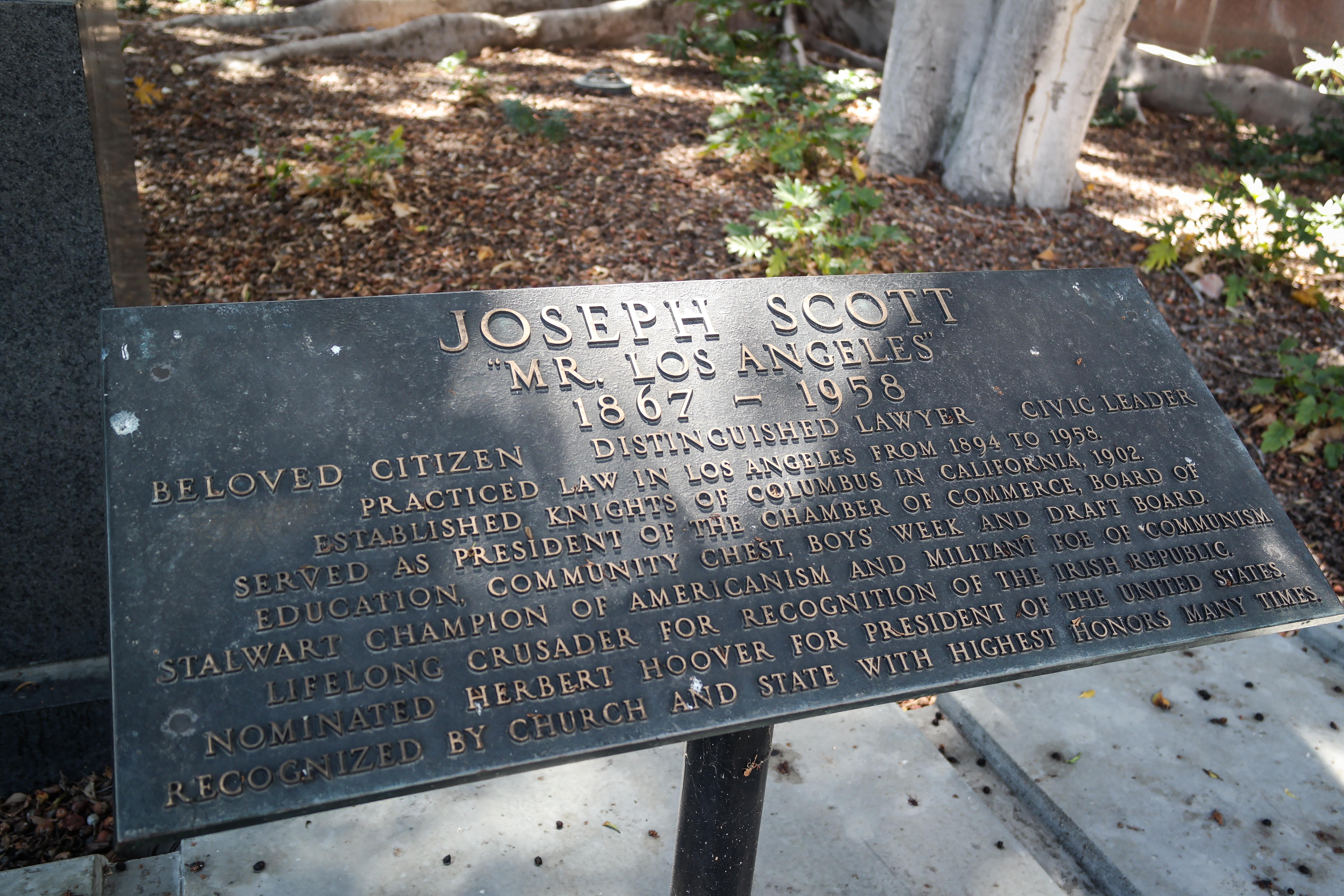
Joseph Scott plaque adjacent to the Stanley Mosk Courthouse

Scott was named an honorary dean of the Loyola Law School. The Joseph Scott Moot Court at Loyola Law School is named for him, as is the Joseph Scott Fellowship—which provides a research grant to a law school faculty member.

A bronze statue of Scott faces Grand Avenue in the front of the Stanley Mosk Courthouse building of the Los Angeles Superior Court. In 1962, noted Los Angeles sculptor Carl Romanelli was commissioned to design a statue of Scott. When fund-raising for the effort fell short, Romanelli withdrew from the project. El Monte sculptor Cataldo Papaleo stepped in, made some changes to Romanelli's design, and cast the piece. Romanelli refused to sign the work, although the statue's base still bears his name. The statue was unveiled in 1967.

Scott is a character in the 1992 film Chaplin, and was portrayed by actor James Woods.
