= Cemar Clay Products =

Pottery in California, United States

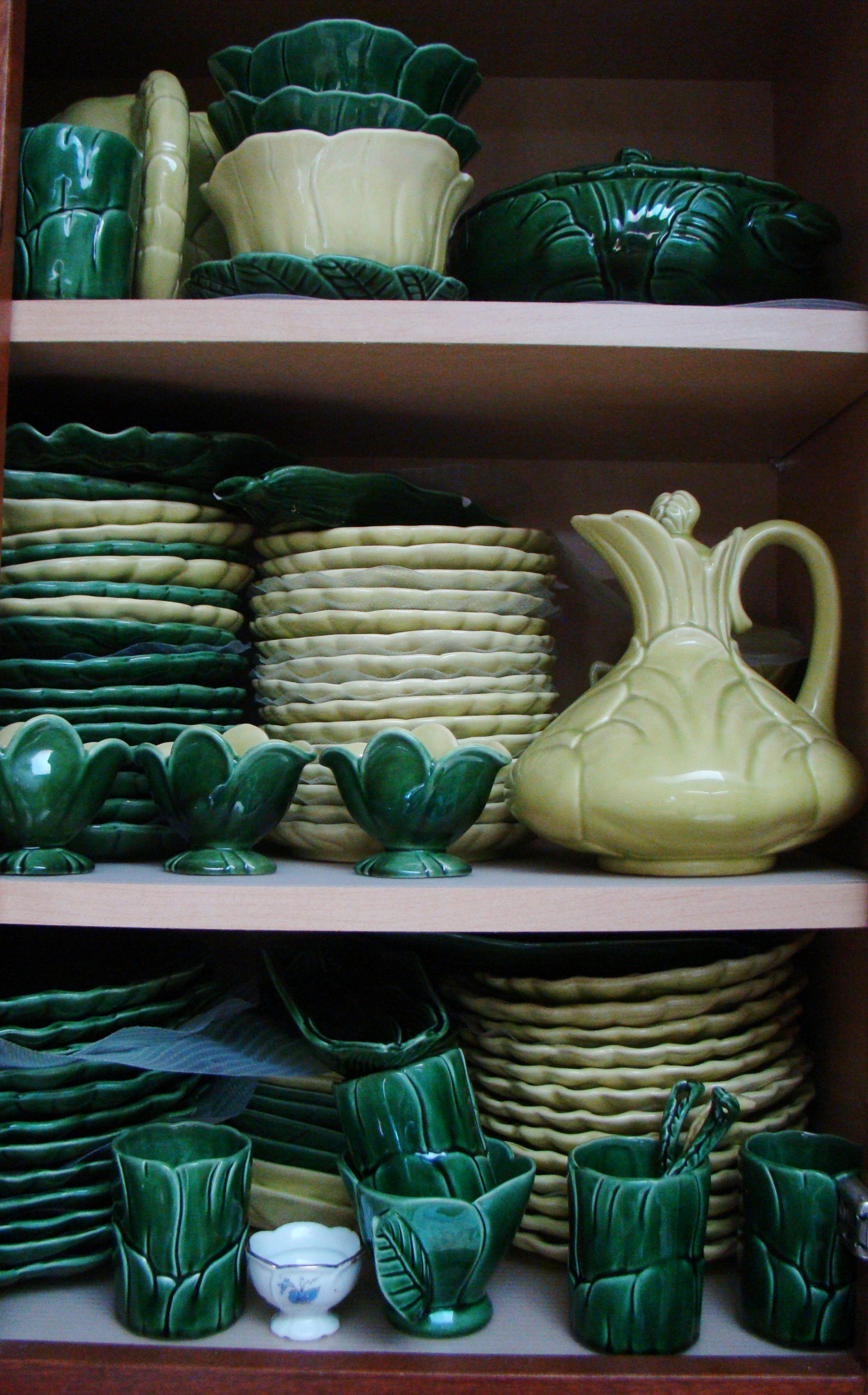
A collection of Cemar Clay Products ceramics.

Cemar Clay Products was a California pottery operating between 1935 and 1955. Cemar's art pottery products, including tableware, are sought-after collectables today.

== History ==
Cemar was founded by Cliff J. Malone and Paul Cauldwell, two former employees of the well-established (J.A.) Bauer Pottery. Cemar Pottery, like Bauer, was based in Los Angeles, California. Cemar was part of the larger boom in California pottery during the World War II era when pottery imports from Asia were restricted or banned; a variety of potteries operated in California to keep up with domestic demand. Cemar was one of 13 members of the California Pottery Guild in 1952.

Cemar's products include giftware, tableware, and garden pottery. Many of Cemar's designs were created by potter Fred Kaye. Many items feature vegetable or fruit designs, or animal designs. Cemar products were produced in many novelty forms, including pineapple-shaped dinnerware. Items were priced at a somewhat higher-end for casual china, selling at around $7.50 for a place setting in 1952.

Cemar's products were featured in numerous women's magazines targeting their marketing towards America's newly affluent middle class housewives: Better Homes and Gardens in 1949; House Beautiful magazine in 1951; and The American Home in 1953. One of Cemar's fish-shaped cookie jars is priced at more than $150 today.

Cemar was bought by Bauer Pottery in the mid-1950s. Bauer reused a number of the molds formerly used by Cemar.

Cemar's products are popular with collectors of California pottery as well as those who look for retro style designs.

== See also ==
- Bauer Pottery
- California pottery
- Earthenware
- Kitsch
- Retro style
