= Romanelli =

Romanelli is a family name of Italian origin. The 1990 Census found that Romanelli was the 21,280th most common surname in the United States.

Some people named Romanelli include:

- Carl Romanelli (politician), a Green Party activist in Pennsylvania
- Carl Romanelli (sculptor), a Los Angeles-born American sculptor
- Carlo Romanelli, an Italian-born American sculptor
- Chris Romanelli, a musician
- Eugenia Romanelli, (born 1972) Italian author and journalist
- Giovanni Francesco Romanelli, an Italian Baroque painter in Rome
- Pasquale Romanelli, an Italian sculptor from Florence
- Pietro Romanelli, an Italian archaeologist
- Raffaello Romanelli, an Italian sculptor from Florence
- Roland Romanelli, a French musician and arranger
- Romano Romanelli, an Italian sculptor from Florence
- Samuel Romanelli, an Italian Jewish traveler and man of letters
