= Lei Day =

May first Hawaiian holiday

Lei Day is a statewide celebration in Hawaii. The celebration begins in the morning of May first every year and continues into the next day. Lei day was established as a holiday in 1929. Each Hawaiian island has a different type of lei for its people to wear in the celebration. The festivities have consistently grown each year and the state of Hawaii has changed the location of the event. Lei day was first held in the Courts and Town Halls but has since been moved to Kapi'olani park.

== History ==
=== About the islands ===
Each island in Hawaii has a special flower that represents that island. The island of Hawaii, more commonly known as The Big Island, has the red blossom of the Ohia tree, called the lehua blossom, for its flower. The island of Maui's flower is called the Lokelani and is pink. The island of Oahu's flower is called the Ilima. The Ilima's color is golden and can be seen all across the island. Molokai uses the flower of the Kukui tree which is green. Lanai has a grassy flower called Kauna'oa, which is yellow. Hinahina, the flower of the island of Kahoolawe, has a silver-gray color across the top. Kauai has mokihana flowers with a green color. The island of Niihau's "flower" is actually shells called Pupu.

=== Becoming official ===
In 1929 Lei Day was officially recognized as a holiday. However, the first celebration of this event was in the year of 1927. The first celebration was held at the Bank of Hawaii, then moved to town hall, and finally moved to Kapi'olani park. In 1928 writer Don Blanding wrote an article in the local newspaper stating that there should be a holiday celebrated around the wearing and production of leis.

=== When it is celebrated ===
Traditionally held on May 1 beginning at 9:00 a.m. The event lasts all through the day and ends at 5:30 p.m. A Lei Contest is held on May 2. It was writer Grace Tower Warren who finally suggested that Lei Day be celebrated on May 1, in conjunction with May Day. She was credited with saying, "Mayday is Lei day".

=== Differences in lei ===
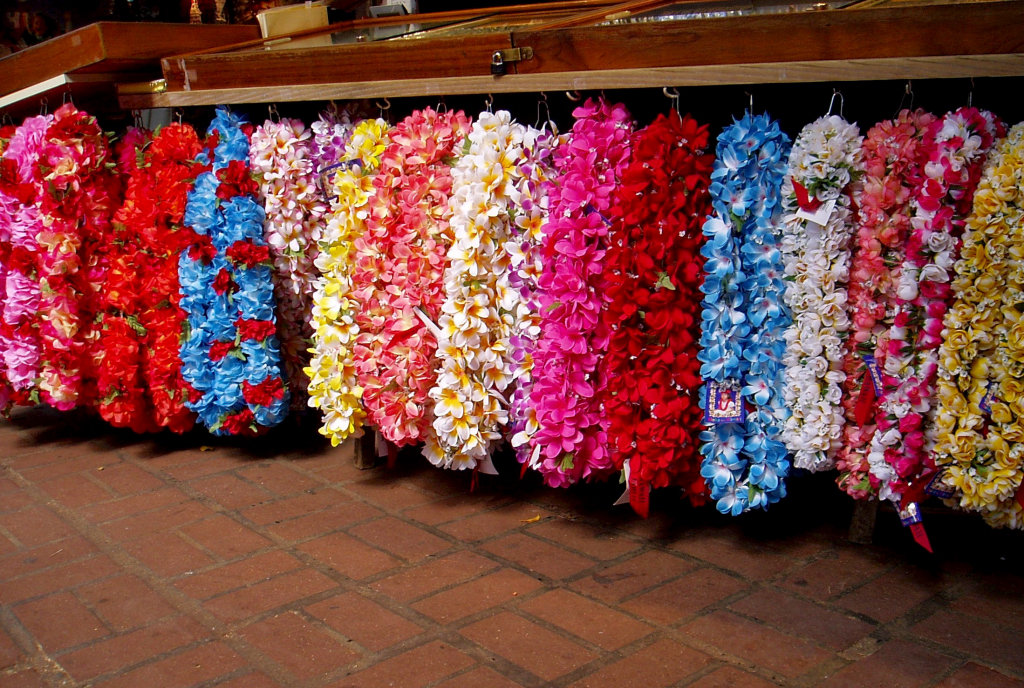
Examples of typical flower leis

Each island of Hawaii has a specific Lei which makes great variety in the leis being produced from each part of Hawaii. The island of Kauai's lei is actually a type of fruit. These purple berries are strung around and leave a blossoming smell that can only be found on this island. Kahoolawe's is called hinahina and this is found on the beaches of Kahoolawe, the stems and flowers of this plant are twisted together to be formed. The island of Lanai has a kaunaoa Lei. The light orange thin strands of vine are gathered in groups and twisted together. The island of Maui houses the lokelani Lei. Its color is pink and is sweet scented and very fragile. Molokai is home to the kukui. The leaves are mostly silver green and combined together to be made into a lei. Niihau is a smaller island, but is very plentiful of pupu. White pupu shells have to be pierced with small holes to be strung into a lei. Oahu has the `Ilima flower. This yellow lei is very thin and even more fragile. This specific lei is often called the "Royal lei" because in the past it was worn by high chieftains.

== Culture ==
Lei Day is a celebration of Hawaiian culture, or the aloha spirit. People commonly celebrate by giving gifts of leis to one another. Schools also put on plays and elect a Lei Day court of Kings and Queens to represent the different islands. Each island has its own symbol that is composed of a color and a flower. Hawaii (the big island) is red, Maui is pink, Oahu is yellow, Molokai is green, Lanai is orange, Kahoolawe is gray, Kauai is purple, and Niihau is white. In the same order the flowers are lehua, lokelani, 'ilima, kukui, kauna'oa, hinahina, mokihana, and a pupu shell. Niihau is the only island without a plant as its symbol.

== Integration of cultures ==
Lei Day in Hawaii incorporates various ethnic traditions, other than their own. Throughout the history of the holiday, natives have struggled between preserving Hawaiian culture and integrating foreign traditions on the special day. This has brought tension to the day of celebration, but over the years has meshed into part of the festivities.

Although many different ethnic groups such as the Scottish, Chinese, Japanese, Portuguese, Korean and Filipino, have settled on the Hawaiian Islands, the dominant integration is of American and European cultures. The music and dance performed during the May 1st celebration is described as hapa haole, or Hawaiian-white. Songs like "Little Grass Shack" and moves that fuse in Euro-American styles are a quite common. In elementary school performances, a typical program will have the kids sing the "Star Spangled Banner", Hawaii’s state song Hawaiʻi Ponoʻi, Hula, Ukulele and other performances unique to the islands. Similar to an American high school homecoming or prom court, Hawaiian high schools announce the king, queen and their royal entourage for the day. During the Second Hawaiian Renaissance in the 1970s, the assimilated American–Hawaiian style was frowned upon, but today it is often accepted as a part of the island’s history. On the other hand, some have seen the assimilation as a loss of cultural identity and life for the Hawaiians, believing that the younger generations will completely lose their ethnic values.

Lei Day, being traditionally diverse, attracts people from all around, to experience the day. Many natives claim that everyone wants to have and be a part of Hawaii. This day invokes the Hawaiian pride and lifestyle in those that have settled there, as well as those that come to visit. Lei Day has become a source of revenue, as it attracts many tourists who are interested in the traditional hula dances and lei ceremonies. Some have even described Lei Day as a tool to lure in people and get them hooked on the cultural life, leading them to permanently live in Hawaii and mesh themselves into the lifestyle.

== Symbolism of the lei ==
The importance of the lei to the Hawaiian culture is that it is meant to represent the unspoken expression of aloha. The meaning of aloha can be interpreted in various ways. Depending on the occasion it can stand for farewell, greeting, love, hope, or joy. These are only a few meanings, as there are no restrictions to the symbolic meaning they hold. The idea is that although the lei lasts only a while, the thought lasts forever. This tradition is spread throughout the major islands on Lei Day. Each island has their own way of celebrating the holiday, as well as a different native vegetation that makes up the lei. Along with different techniques of assembling them.

Other than the use of leis on Lei Day, they are incorporated in special occasions such as graduations, weddings and birthdays. The tradition was brought over by Polynesian voyagers sailing from Tahiti. In the past, maile leis, known as one of the most sacred leis, was used in peace agreements between opposing peoples. In addition to wearing the lei as a source of beautification, the lei was a way to distinguish groups of people from one another. The lei comes with a set of unspoken rules such as wearing it over your shoulders, not removing it while around the person that gave you the lei, and refusing a lei is seen as disrespectful. Over the years the lei has grown to become an accepted symbol of Hawaii that greets many visitors each year.

== Tradition ==
The traditions of the “Hawaiian Lei Day” are celebrated on many of the Hawaiian Islands. Parades and ceremonies, also festivals, are a major part of the Hawaiian Lei Day; also, numerous schools participate in the Hawaiian Lei Day festivities. “I can remember the joy of the annual Lei Day ceremony that permeated the campus of my elementary and middle schools while growing up on Oʻahu. The entire student body would get involved: each class performed the hula for the entire school (we practiced for weeks beforehand)…”. It is tradition that Hawaiian elementary and junior high schools encourage students to perform numerous Hawaiian dances for the entire school. For example, Barbers Point Elementary School incorporates the entire community with their annual performances; each grade level performs a different Hawaiian dance to a different song for various members of their community. Many of the Hawaiian Lei Day traditions are, also, practiced on set dates; should the set date of a tradition interfere with school and/or work, the set date of that tradition would be considered a holiday. Many Hawaiian educational facilities organize various festivities, such as hula dances, Hawaiian feasts, and a “Hawaiian Lei Day “Queen” ceremony.

In Hawaii, it is a remarkable honor to be crowned “Lei Day Queen”; there are pageants, having similarities of the Miss America Beauty Pageant, that determine which young woman would be crowned Lei Day Queen. However, the most important Hawaiian Lei Day ceremony takes place in Oahu at Kapiʻolani Park. Visitors are able to witness and partake in the numerous festivities that involve the beautiful Hawaiian leis. Many leis become a part of numerous contests: "As is tradition, the dozens of entries in the annual contest are placed at the Royal Mausoleum in Nuuanu the next morning…". The Hawaiian Lei Day Queen determines which lei would win the contest. Many of the traditional contests of the Hawaiian Lei Day are centered on the craftiness and intricacy of leis; some of the “winning leis” are put on display until the next annual contest.

In Honolulu, there are many different festivities that are centered on the Hawaiian lei. For example, one of the festivities includes the sharing of lei crafting techniques by Islanders. Also, there are many lectures given by Islanders about the symbolism and cultural meaning of the Hawaiian lei. For example, Islanders demonstrate that a lei that is received in a certain manner translates into a particular meaning: a greeting, a farewell, a marriage, a celebration, etc. The color of the lei, also, represents certain translations; different leis should be worn for different occasions. There are also lectures about the history of Hawaiian Lei Day and of the lei. Honolulu, also, holds a Hawaiian Lei Day Queen pageant and many lei crafting contests; many entertainers also make appearances for the Lei Day celebration in Honolulu.

On Hawaii Island, the"Big Island" of Hawaii, the annual Hilo Lei Day Festival features live music, Hula dancing, and crafty demonstrations. Also, “special guests” make appearances at numerous festivities; many of the "special guests" are "guest speakers" that speak to audiences about the customs and traditions that are centered on the Hawaiian lei. There are, also, many festivities that are centered on Hawaiian culture, such as many various cultural dances, food, and shopping. Many festivals, also, feature numerous types of entertainers: local Hawaiian musical groups and local DJs, Hula dancers, etc. Much larger Hawaiian Lei Day festivals, of course, have a much wider venue of entertainers and activities that locals could choose from.
