= Bauer Pottery =

American pottery

J.A. Bauer Pottery is an American pottery that was founded in Paducah, Kentucky in 1885 and operated for most of its life in Lincoln Heights, Los Angeles. It closed in 1962. In 2000, a new company re-established the Bauer brand. It produces reproductions of Bauer dishes from the 1930s and 1940s in original and new colors.

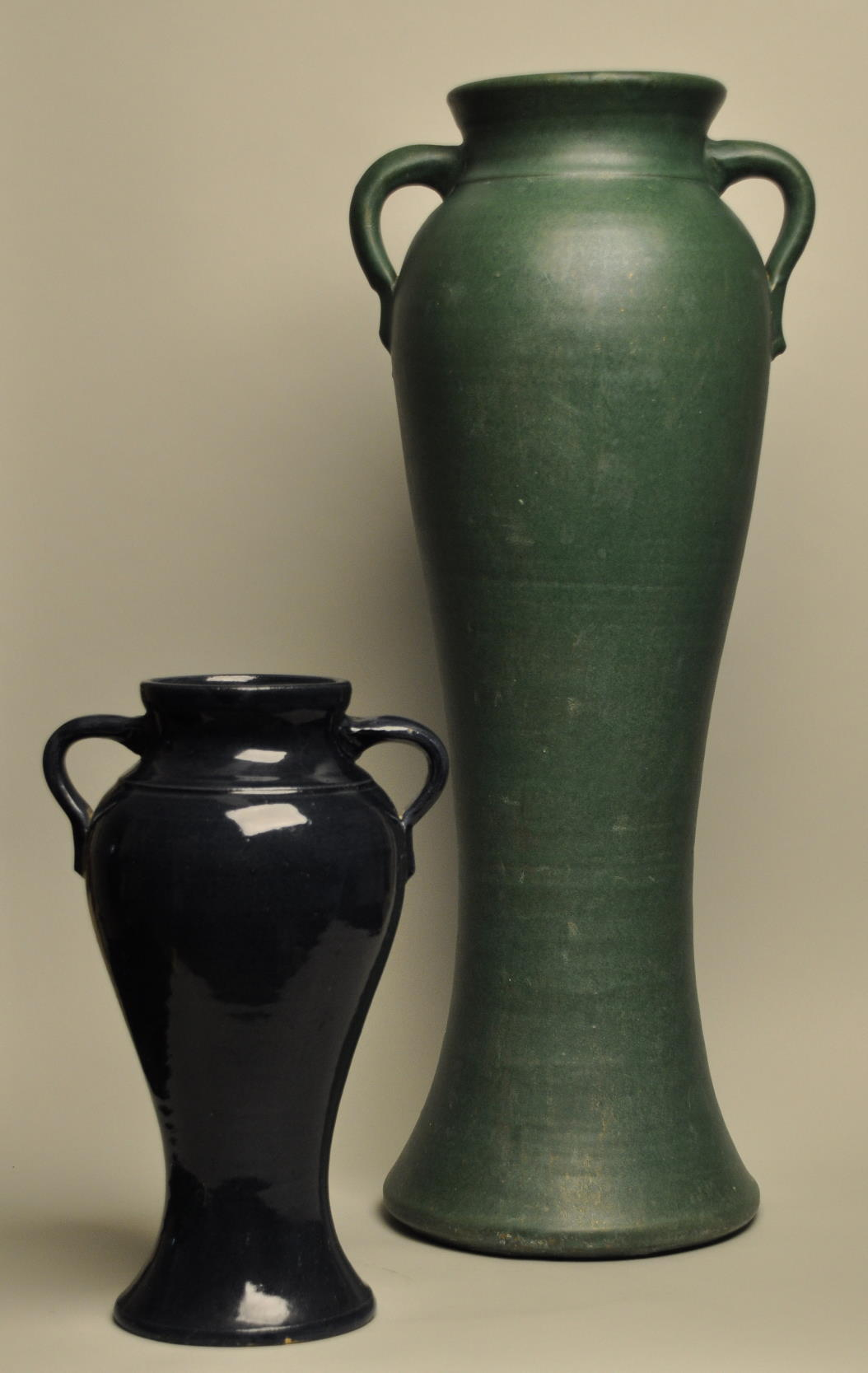
J.A. Bauer Pottery Rebekah vases

== History ==
In 1885, John Andrew "Andy" Bauer bought out Frank Parham's Paducah Pottery in Paducah, Kentucky, a pottery whose main products were brown-glazed, hand-thrown wares including crocks and jugs. J.A. Bauer moved his family to Los Angeles in early 1909, and selected a new site for a pottery. J.A. Bauer Pottery Company was built at 415-421 West Avenue 33 in Lincoln Heights, an area between Los Angeles and Pasadena, California. The first products were the same products J.A. Bauer produced in Paducah. Demand from the nursery trade added new products to the pottery's wares including flower pots, garden ware, and planters.

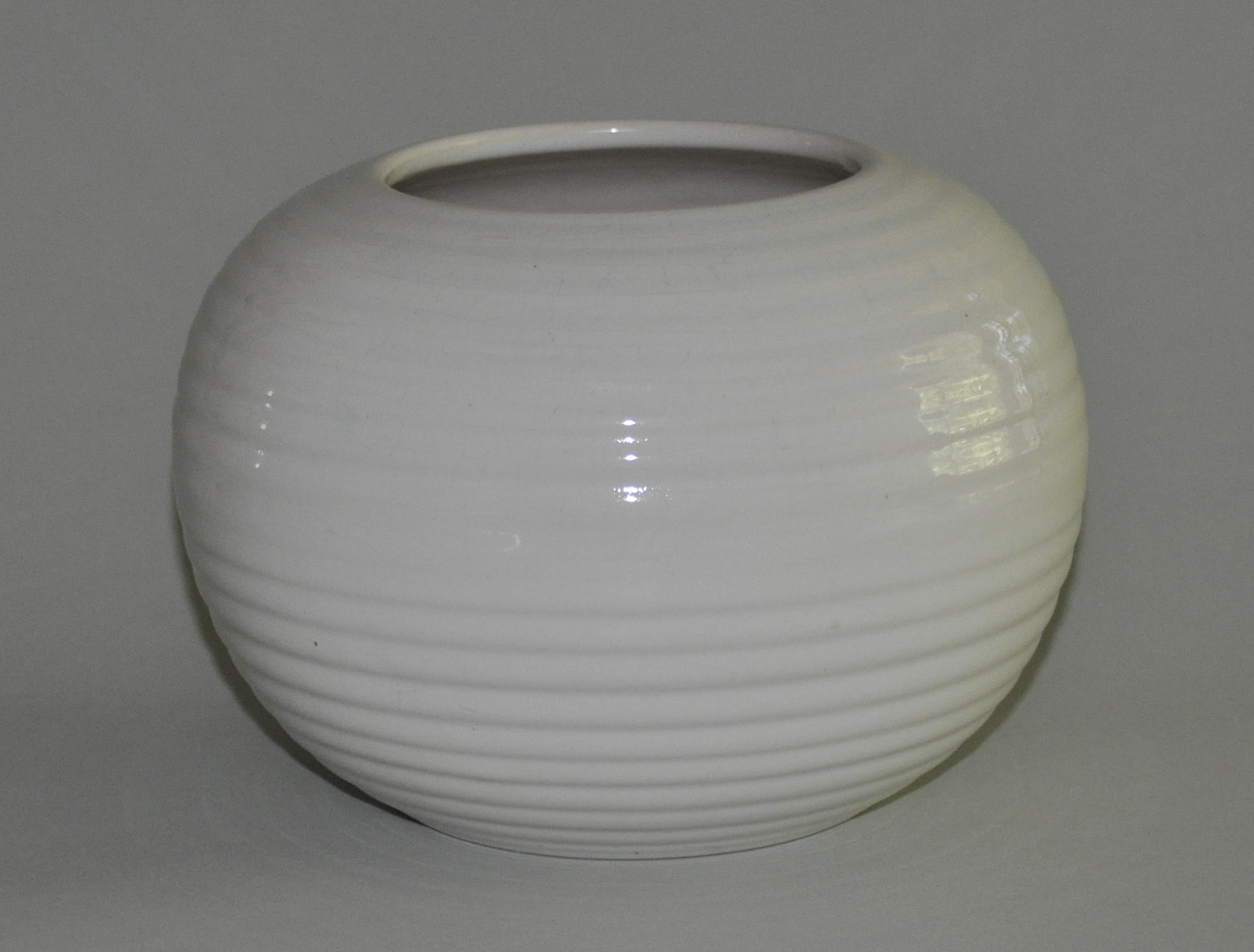
J.A. Bauer ring ware vase

Louis Ipsen was hired around 1912 as a designer, adding fancy redware items to the pottery lines. Matterson (Matt) Carlton, an accomplished turner, joined the company producing hand-thrown vases, rose jars, and carnation vases for the nursery trade. In 1922, J. A. Bauer retired and in 1923 died. One third of the company was sold to his daughter Eve, and her husband Watson E. Bockman. The other two thirds was sold to Bernard Bernheim. Bockman became president of the company. By 1928, Bockman resigned and the heirs of Bernard Bernheim, sons Sam and Lynn Bernheim, ran the company. In 1929 W. E. Bockman bought out the Bernheims and once again became president of the company. Bockman hired ceramic engineer Victor F. Houser to develop new glazes. "The introduction of Houser's brilliant new colors on Ipsen's dishes proved a momentous event.",

Around 1930, Bauer Pottery introduced California Colored Pottery. Other Southern California potteries producing solid colored earthenware tableware and kitchenware products around the same time period as the introduction of Bauer's California Colored Pottery were Gladding, McBean & Co.'s Franciscan Ware, Metlox Manufacturing Company, Pacific Clay Potteries' Hostess Ware, Vernon Kilns' Early California, and Catalina Clay Products' Catalina Pottery. By 1933, the company added ridged or "ring" dishes, including its distinctive Ringware line, named for the concentric circles that mark the pieces. In 1934, Fred Johnson, Matt Carlton's nephew and an accomplished hand-thrower formerly with the Niloak Pottery in Benton, Arkansas, joined the company. Fred Johnson added new shapes to Bauer Pottery's table and art ware lines.

In 1938, Bauer Pottery sought to expand their market to the East coast by purchasing, and converting to a pottery, an old winery in Atlanta, Georgia. W. E. Bockman died before Bauer Atlanta was opened. John Herbert (Herb) Brutsche took over management of the Atlanta plant, and James (Jim) Bockman became the Los Angeles plant's general manager. A line of art pottery produced in the Atlanta plant was designed by industrial designer Russel Wright in 1945. The Russel Wright Bauer line was not successful and was discontinued shortly after its introduction. The Bauer Atlanta plant was converted into a sanitary ware production plant, Georgia Sanitary Pottery.

In 1962, Bauer Pottery ceased operations; Eva Bockman shut down Bauer Pottery rather than settle a general labor strike which began in the fall of 1961.

=== Revival ===
Bauer Pottery was revived in 2000 by collector Janek Boniecki in a small ceramic studio outside Los Angeles. The new company introduced a new line, Bauer 2000, featuring pieces based on original shapes and colors from the 1930s and 1940s. Unable to locate any original Bauer dies or molds, Boniecki reverse-engineered the new line from pieces from his own collection and other vintage purchases.

== See also ==
- Cemar Clay Products
