= Carl Romanelli =

American sculptor

Carl Romanelli is an American sculptor noted for his many outdoor sculptures of famous people. Romanelli was born and raised in Los Angeles, California. He is a seventh-generation sculptor, and his family is so well known in Italy that a museum there is dedicated to his family's sculptural works.

Romanelli's sculpture of Elvis Presley, on display at the Las Vegas Hilton in 2009

Romanelli designed artware in the 1930s, 1940s, and 1950s. For a time, he created artwork for the Works Project Administration. Lamps, plates and pottery designed by him were issued by Maddux of California, Incolay Studios Metroluxas well as Metlox Pottery of California in Manhattan Beach. At Metlox, he designed (holds Patent) various glassware and pottery. In the 1960s and 1970s, he turned toward life-size statues of people, many of them designed to be displayed outdoors. Among his more notable public works are a statue of St. Michael outside St. Michael's Church in Los Angeles; a statue of St. Vincent de Paul in Los Angeles; and a modern art piece outside Temple Shaarei Tikvah in Arcadia, California. He also designed (but did not execute) the Joseph Scott statue outside the Stanley Mosk Courthouse building of the Los Angeles Superior Court.

His most famous work is a likeness of Elvis Presley outside the Las Vegas Hilton hotel. The statue was dedicated on September 8, 1978, and stood outside the property in a glass case for 28 years. In 2005, the statue was placed in storage while the facility underwent renovation. It was placed back on public display in 2006 in a courtyard inside the hotel. At one point, the statue was insured for a sizeable $1.5 million. Romanelli also was the sculptor for the Al Jolson Memorial Shrine at Hillside Memorial Park in Los Angeles.
