= Don Blanding =

American poet and artist (1894–1957)

- Born: Donald Benson Blanding; November 7, 1894; Kingfisher, Oklahoma Territory, U.S.
- Died: June 9, 1957 (aged 62)
- Spouse: Dorothy Binney (m. 1940; div. 1947)

Donald Benson Blanding (November 7, 1894–June 9, 1957) was an American poet, sometimes described as the "poet laureate of Hawaii." He was also a journalist, cartoonist, author and speaker.

== Early life ==
Blanding was born in Kingfisher, Oklahoma. His father Hugh Ross Blanding was a judge and first commissioner for Indian Affairs, and his mother, Ida Kimble, helped found the Enid Public Library. Participating in the Cherokee Strip Land Run, his family moved to Enid, and then Lawton where he grew up alongside Lucille "Billie" Cassin (later known as Joan Crawford), later assisting her after she cut her foot on a broken milk bottle. Blanding would later make this incident the focus of a poem he wrote when the two met years later. He graduated from Lawton High School in 1912. He trained between 1913 and 1915 at the Art Institute of Chicago. Blanding pursued further art studies in 1920, in Paris and London, traveled in Central America and the Yucatan, and returned to Honolulu in 1921.

== Military service ==
He enlisted (for a year, or the duration of World War I plus up to six months) in the Canadian Army's 97th ("American Legion") Battalion. He then trained with them for trench warfare for eight months in 1916, but left under unknown circumstances a few days before the unit shipped out for Europe. Blanding would omit reference to that service and training a year later when joining the U.S. military.

Blanding became fascinated by Hawaii and moved there in 1915, staying until his enlistment in the U.S. Army in December, 1917. Entering as an infantry private, he underwent officer training and was commissioned a 2nd lieutenant before being discharged in December, 1918, soon after the Armistice.

Blanding was strongly affected by U.S. entry into World War II, including the knowledge of his island paradise as a military target, the reactions of those he met on his lecture tours, and the fall of Bataan. Bataan surrendered April 9, 1942, while he was on tour, and he wrote "Bataan Falls", 16 emotional lines in response. On April 25, he enlisted in the U.S. Army as a private at the age of 47. He served eleven months in the 1208th Service Corps Unit, Infantry, and was discharged as a corporal. He wrote "Pilot Bails Out" about his experiences as a soldier.

== Poetry career ==
Finding work as an artist in an advertising agency, he published poetry daily in the Honolulu Star Bulletin for an advertiser between 1921 and 1923. These featured local people and events, and became well-known and popular – whether because of or in spite of always mentioning the Aji-No-Moto brand of MSG.

The popularity of these ad-poems led Blanding to follow the advice of newspaper colleagues by publishing a collection of his poetry in 1923. When his privately published 2,000 copies quickly sold out, he followed it with a commercially published edition the same year, and with additional verse and prose books. For his fifth book in 1928, he no longer used a local or West Coast publisher, but the New York publisher Dodd, Mead & Company. The result, Vagabond's House, was reviewed promptly by The New York Times, and was a great commercial success. By 1948 it went through nearly fifty printings in several editions that together sold over 150,000 copies.

Blanding was nicknamed in the press as the "Vagabond Poet" and the "Poet Laureate of Aji-No-Moto".

In 1929, Hawaiian House Representative John C. Anderson proposed an honorary poet laureate position for the state of Hawaii, but the bill was tabled after discussion.

In 1937, in the Enid Morning News, he was referred to as the poet laureate of Enid, Oklahoma. It is unclear who conferred upon Blanding the title of poet laureate of the Hawaiian Islands. In 1932 the Honolulu Star Bulletin refers to him as "Hawaii's Poet Laureate." In 1937, a letter to the Honolulu Star-Bulletin suggested that Blanding be officially named Poet Laureate of Hawaii.

However, in 1939, he was referred to in the Hawaii Tribune-Herald as the "unofficial poet laureate," and articles in the Honolulu Advertiser also named his contemporary Charles Eugene Banks as unofficial poet laureate of Hawaii.

His obituary in the Los Angeles Times refers to him as the "Poet Laureate of Honolulu."

On Tuesday, June 11, 1957, Hawaiian Congressman John A. Burns posthumously honored Blanding during congressional proceedings and referred to Blanding as the Poet Laureate of Hawaii.

== "Vagabond's House" ==
He published his long poem "Vagabond's House" several times. (It was in the first, private, printing of Leaves from a Grass-House in 1923; the commercially published edition of the same book, later that year, included it with the title changed to "Aloha House". In 1928 he restored the original "Vagabond's House" title, making it the title poem of another collection.) Its detailed fantasy begins

When I have a house – as I sometime may –
I'll suit my fancy in every way.

then describes a home filled with the mostly exotic mementos its poet collected in years of wandering the world's seaports – or at least might have collected if his travels had not interfered – and closes by admitting

It's just a dream house anyway.

Aloha, Vagabond's House. You know I take you with me in my memory and my heart. Aloha.

— Don Blanding

In 1939, Blanding wrote Drifter's Gold from his Carmel-by-the-Sea, California house, which he called "Vagabond's House." He penned many of his California books while living at Vagabond's House, located at Monte Verde Street and 6th Avenue. From 1938 to 1940, he also wrote a weekly column in the Carmel Pine Cone, called "From A Window In Vagabond's House." In February 1940, he wrote in his column that he had sold his Vagabond's House to Bob and Helen Spencer.

== Blanding as an artist ==
Underwater Scene by Don Blanding, c. 1927–30, oil on canvas

Blanding's paintings often portray undersea views, flowers and branches. Underwater Scene, from c. 1927–30, demonstrates his use of sharp outlines and lack of shading. His ink drawings are a powerful part of his many literary publications. From 1938 to 1942, Don Blanding designed Hawaiian themed tableware for Vernon Kilns, near Los Angeles, California. The patterns he designed are Aquarium, Coral Reef, Delight, Ecstasy, Glamour, Hawaii, Hawaiian Flowers, Hilo, Honolulu, and Lei Lani.

== Personal life ==
Blanding married socialite, Dorothy Binney Putnam, on June 13, 1940, and they lived together in Fort Pierce, Florida. They divorced in June 1947, leaving no descendants. Blanding died of a heart attack at his home in Los Angeles on June 9, 1957, at the age of 62.

== Legacy ==
On May 1 each year, Hawaiians celebrate "Lei Day", first conceived in 1927 by Blanding. At the time, Blanding was employed by the Honolulu Star Bulletin, and he shared his idea with columnist Grace Tower Warren, who came up with the phrase, "May Day is Lei Day". The Hawaiian song, "May Day is Lei Day in Hawaii" was composed in 1927 by Ruth and Leonard "Red" Hawk.

The Don Blanding Poetry Society in Enid, Oklahoma is named after him. Blanding lived in Enid as a child from age 3 to 7.

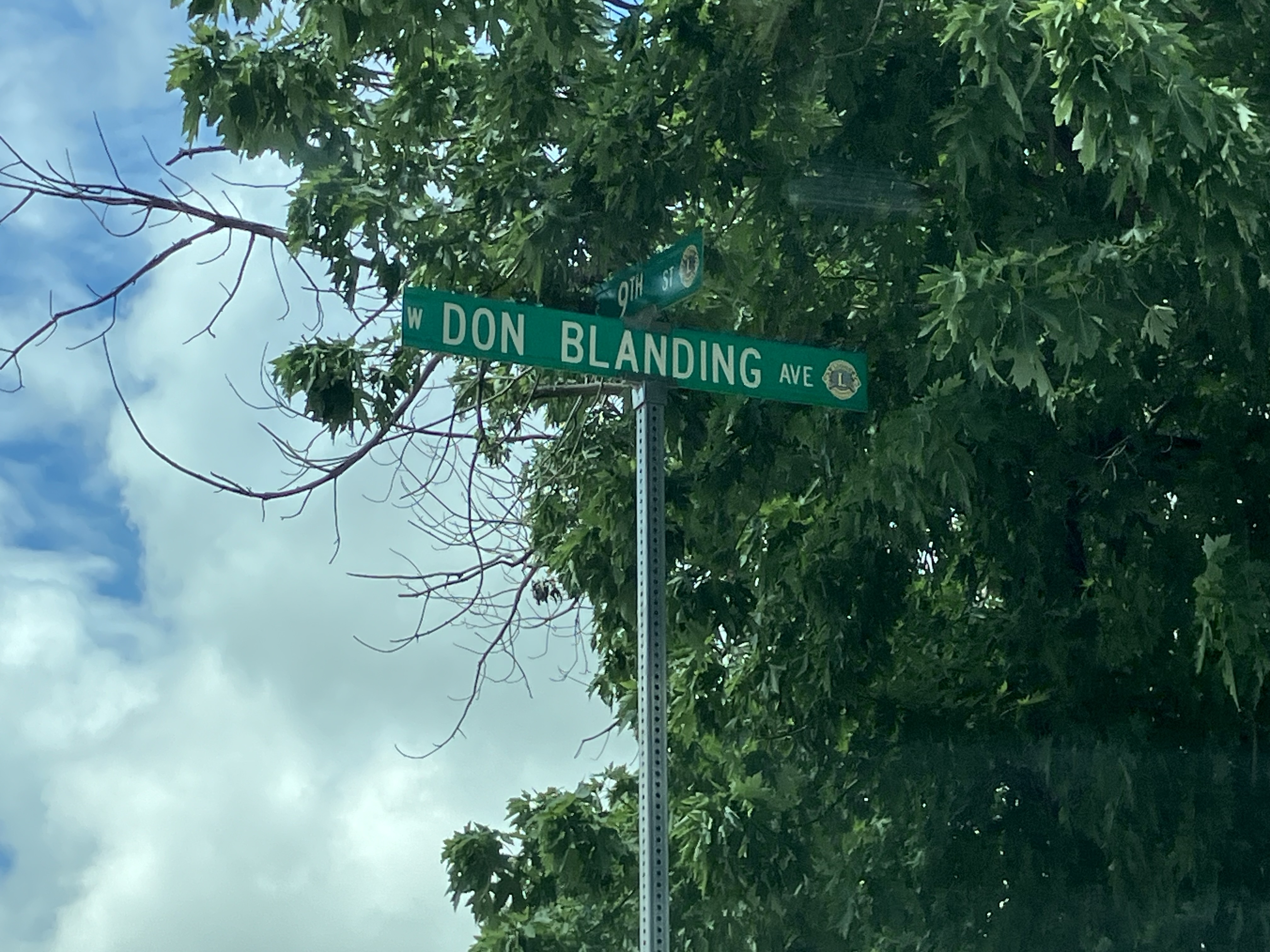
Don Blanding Avenue in Kingfisher, Oklahoma

Kingfisher, Oklahoma's Don Blanding Avenue is named after the poet. In 1957, Kingfisher posthumously renamed Euclid Avenue after Blanding because he was born in a house at Euclid and Eighth.

== Bibliography ==
- Leaves from a Grass-House
  - 2000-copy private printing – 1923
  - commercial publication – 1923
- Paradise Loot – 1925
- Flowers of the Rainbow – 1926
- The Virgin of Waikiki – 1926
- Vagabond's House – 1928
  - Also published under the title Aloha House
- Hula Moons – 1930
- Songs of the Seven Senses – 1931
- Stowaways in Paradise – 1931
- Let Us Dream – 1933
- Memory Room – 1935
- Pictures of Paradise – 1936
- The Rest of the Road – 1937
- Drifter's Gold – 1939
- Floridays – 1941 noted as a nice book to read while at home in 2020
- Pilot Bails Out – 1943, reviewed by the New York Times
- Today is Here – 1946
- Mostly California – 1948
- A Grand Time Living – 1950
- Joy is an Inside Job – 1953
- Hawaii Says Aloha – 1955
- No Strings on Tomorrow – Unpublished

== Sources ==
- Papanikolas, Theresa and DeSoto Brown, Art Deco Hawai'i, Honolulu, Honolulu Museum of Art, 2014, ISBN 978-0-937426-89-0, pp. 43, 58–59
- Severson, Don R., Finding Paradise, Island Art in Private Collections, University of Hawaii Press, 2002, pp. 142–43, 278–81.
