= Metlox Pottery =

American ceramic manufacturer

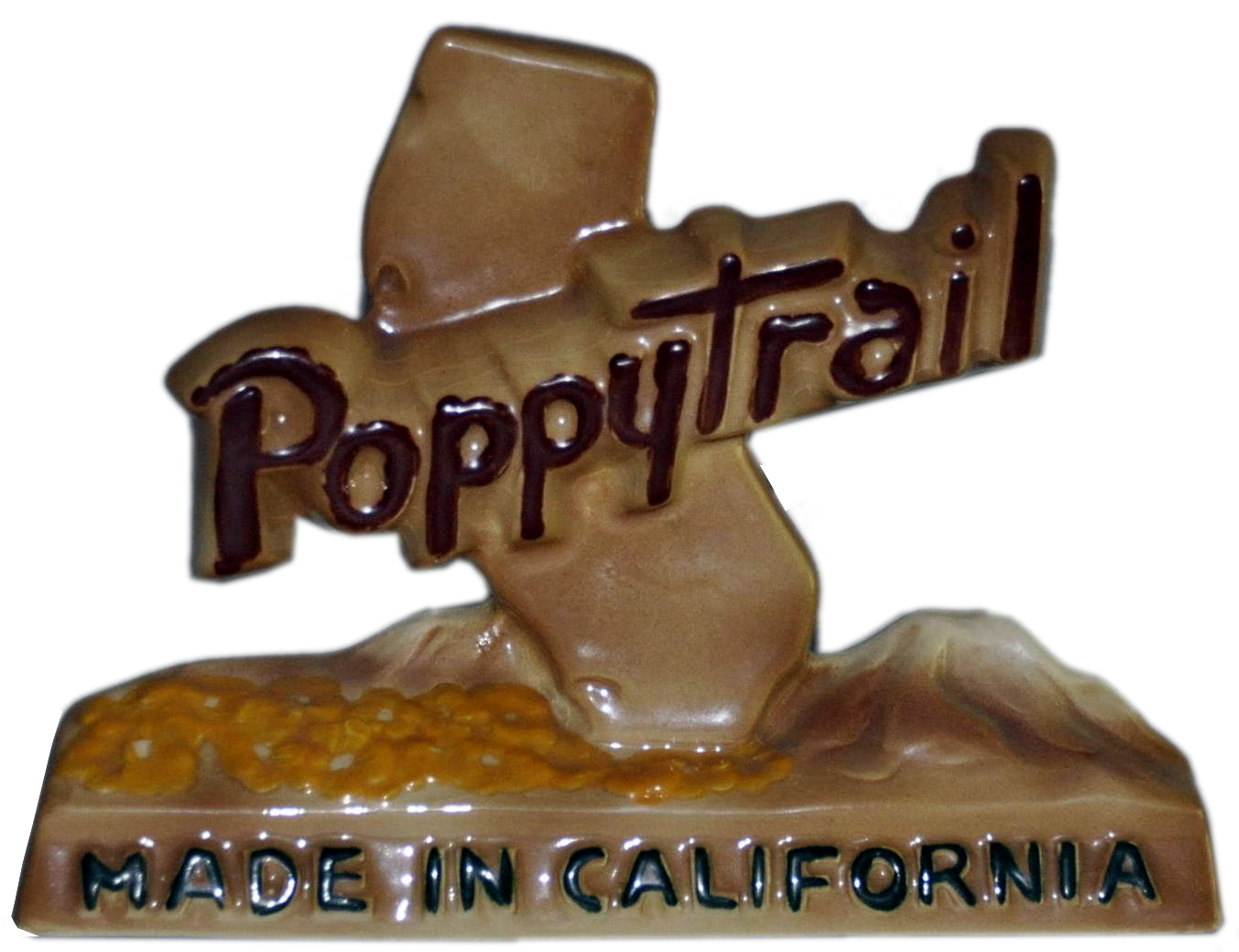
- Type: Incorporated
- Industry: Pottery
- Founded: 1927; 99 years ago
- Founder: Theodor C. Prouty and Willis Prouty
- Defunct: 1989
- Fate: Closed
- Headquarters: Manhattan Beach, California, United States

Metlox Manufacturing Company, also commonly known as Metlox Pottery, was an American ceramics company and manufacturer of housewares, located at 1200 Morningside Drive, Manhattan Beach, California, US. The pottery factory closed in 1989.

== History ==
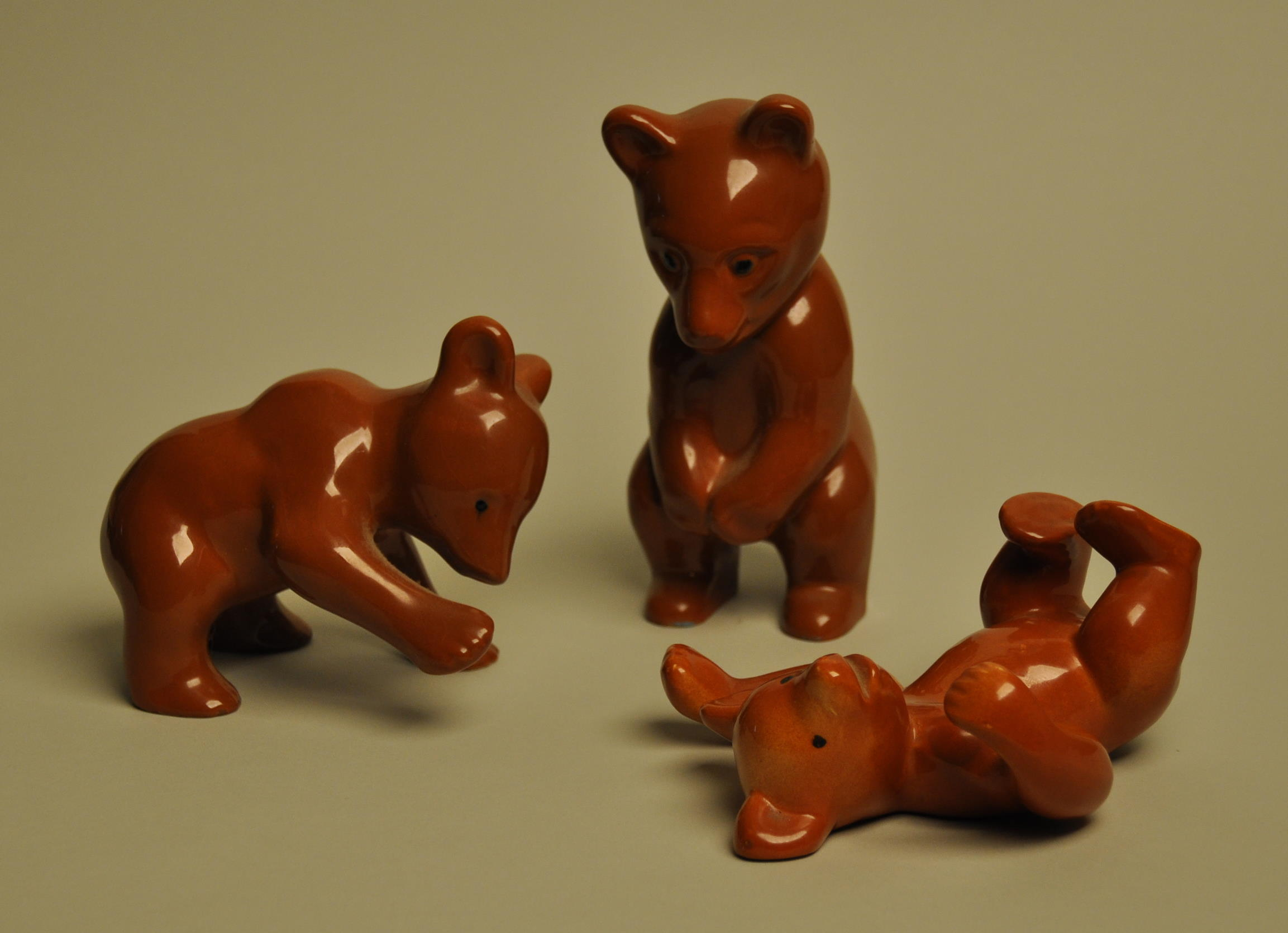
Metlox Pottery miniatures "playful bears"

In 1921 Theodor C. Prouty and his son Willis Prouty founded Proutyline Products in Hermosa Beach, California, selling their patented architectural tiles, which were made from a unique mixture of clay with a high concentration of talc. In 1927, Metlox Manufacturing Co. was established as a division of Proutyline. The name is a contraction of "metal" and "oxide", a reference to the glaze pigments. Metlox originally specialized in the production of large scale outdoor ceramic signs – the glazed ceramic was largely impervious to the elements and also served as the insulated base for decorative neon tubing. One of the most well known surviving examples of these is the Metlox sign above the entrance to the Pantages Theater in Hollywood. The growing popularity of the movie theater business helped the business remain prosperous during the first few years of the Great Depression.

Theodore died in 1931, and Willis took over. As the sign business started to dwindle, partially taking inspiration from the popularity of Bauer Pottery's then newly-released brightly colored kitchen and tableware, Willis had the factory's facilities adapted for the production of dinnerware, launching their first pattern, "California Pottery", in 1932. The Metlox Manufacturing Company was incorporated 5 October 1933. Metlox's second line, 1934's "Poppytrail," named in honor of the state flower of California, became one of their most famous. Evan K. Shaw, of American Pottery in Los Angeles, purchased Metlox from Willis Prouty in 1946.

In the 1950s Metlox introduced a line of modernist dinnerware featuring free form designs and squared plates using "blanks" that were then decorated with designs and colors. These were then marketed under the pattern names of "California Contempra", "California Modern" and "California Freeform" names.

Besides kitchenware, Metlox also produced a very popular line of large ceramic horses and carriages in the 1950s. Carl Romanelli designed vases, figurines and miniatures for Metlox. A line of collectible ceramic people planters called "Poppets," designed by studio potter Helen Slater, were produced starting in 1970.

In March 1971, the FDA announced a recall of over 400,000 pieces of Metlox pottery due to high lead content in the pottery glaze. One individual was suspected to have been poisoned. The company voluntarily recalled their California Poppytrail Tempo and Mission Verde Series; with a portion of their Petalburst Metlox Vernonware Series. The remainder of Metlox's pottery did not present lead leaching.

Metlox's incorporation was terminated on 4 January 1988. The pottery factory closed in 1989 after 62 years of operation. Metlox's 97,000-square-foot (9,000 m^{2}) former site is now occupied by Shade Hotel and other businesses.

After the pottery plant closed, lead dust and other hazardous byproducts of the pottery-making process remained on the property at Manhattan Beach Boulevard and Valley Drive. The city estimated remediation would take about 2 years with the cost to be collected from the property owners or having the site put on a State or Federal cleanup list.

== See also ==
- California pottery
