= Model horse showing =

Model horse showing is a hobby built around the collection of scale model horses, with equal focus on honouring the (real) horse show industry as well as the artistic merit of the miniatures.

== Classes & Divisions ==
Model horse shows consist primarily of two divisions: Halter and Performance. There are both Halter-only and Performance-only shows, though many larger shows will include both. Often there are up to three shows run side-by-side: Youth, Novice and/or Open. Individual shows will make their own guidelines for what qualifies entry to each of these categories.

Several abbreviations commonly occur: OF (Original Finish), CM (Custom) and AR (Artist Resin).

=== Halter Division ===
These classes evaluate how a model represents the actual breed of horse. The divisions and judging criteria are derived from their real-life counterparts. Although known as "Halter", no tack or costume is required on the model, and it is generally omitted.

Halter can be further broken down into subdivisions based on manufacturing medium to equalize the different fields of craftsmanship. Common subdivisions include:

- OF Plastic or Original Finish Plastic, refers to the original plastic horses produced by companies such as the Breyer Horse Company or the Peter Stone Company. Many shows now further break this down to give separate classes to Breyer and Peter Stone Company horses.
- OF China/Resin or Original Finish Chinas and Resins, refers to professionally produced porcelain horses produced by companies such as Animal Artistry, Pour Horse Pottery, or Alchemy Fine China.
- Artist Resin refers to professionally produced resin models which have been individually painted by professional or amateur artists.
- CM Plastic typically refers to OF Plastic horses that have been repainted, haired, or resculpted, regardless of original material or manufacturer. The custom may be a drastic custom, where the original model is no longer recognisable, or a minimal custom.
- CM China or Custom Glazed Chinas, refers to professionally produced porcelain horses that have been individually re-glazed, whether by a professional or amateur.

=== Collectibility Division ===
These classes evaluate the rarity and condition of models. Documentation as to why a given model is collectible (i.e. very low number produced, very hard to find due to age, unrealistic colours etc.) is often presented with the entry. Some shows require documentation. Many collectibility divisions also include classes for non-equine models. Models in this division are always Original Finish models.

=== Workmanship Division ===
These classes evaluate the finishwork of the model. Preparation work on the model before final painting, any re-sculpting work, and final painting are all considered. These models are never Original Finish models, although they may have begun as OF models.

=== Performance Division ===
The Performance classes focuses more on the model, its pose, and its suitability to real-life tasks. Performance divisions requires suitable tack for the model, and sometimes a rider and/or backdrop. Props such as jumps, fences and other animals may also be allowed. Common classes include:

- English Performance, where models are placed in simple dioramas reflecting the events of traditional English Hunter/Jumper and racing competitions.
- Western Performance, with divisions for stock work (cutting, roping), rodeo, reining and trail work as well as traditional western classes such as pleasure, horsemanship and trail.
- Other Performance, often includes the Costume class, where a model is judged by both its own conformation as well as the accuracy and craftsmanship of the costume it wears.

== Live Shows ==
"Live Shows" are events where model horses may be shown and judged. These take place throughout the year in many countries, and are often regulated by a larger live showing organisation such as NAMHSA (North American Model Horse Showers Association) in the United States and BECF (British Equine Collectors' Forum) in Great Britain. At these shows, first and second place in many classes can qualify a model for a yearly championship - this is commonly referred to as "NANing", as NAMHSA-qualified horses receive "NAN" (North American Nationals) cards. Listings of approved upcoming shows are maintained by these organisations.

For most live shows there is an entry fee, which varies depending on the table space taken up by the entrant (full table or half table). Proxy showing, whereby a collector's model is shown by another, may also be allowed for a fee.

Live shows can vary in scale, from large weekend-long shows coinciding with other events, to smaller shows held in the organiser's house. Shows may offer ribbons, rosettes or prizes (often model horses) for any number of places; however shows advertised as "no-frills" tend to award paper ribbons for lower placings to reduce costs and entry fees. Live shows often have vendors present selling model horse and equestrian-related goods. Many showers also sell or trade models at shows.

Horses are sometimes required to have information about the entry (including name, breed and gender) on either a tag attached to the off-side hind leg of model, or on a regulation-size card. Breed/colour/performance references may be placed on the table beside the horse, depending on the table size and number of horses in the class as stated in the show guidelines. Often large books are not allowed.

== Photo Shows ==
"Photo showing" is a way of showing one's model horse collection without the risk and expense of transporting it to a live show. Photo shows can contain any of the classes found in live shows, including Halter, Performance and Collectibility classes.

Photo showing originated as an alternative to "live" showing. Photo showing originally involved taking photographs of the models and posting them to the show holder, to be judged alongside other entrants; this is now referred to as 'postal showing' and has become less popular with the invention of the internet. The majority of photo showing now takes place online. Photos may be emailed directly to the show holder or upload to various web services, such as YouTube, Instagram or Facebook. Photo shows are typically not registered with a higher body such as NAMHSA, and are run on a more adhoc basis, therefore can only be found through searching social networks.

Photo shows are judged taking into account the same criteria as in live shows, but it may also take into account the quality of the photo (background, framing, lighting etc.) and how representative the photos are of the horse. Shows may place requirements on how many views of the model are photographed (i.e. on-side, off-side, head-shot, markings). Information about the entrant (such as class, model name, breed and gender) is usually included before the photo in the case of a video entry, or in a caption or description in the case of a photo entry. Reference photos of real-life animals or breed information may be included to support breed or colour choices for a particular model. As with live-showing, models are not always shown as the breed the manufacturer intended to represent, and less common but well-chosen breeds are often believed to be favoured by judges.

Due to the nature of photo showing, the requirement for an entrance fee can vary. Postal showing typically required a fee which may include the cost of returning the photos. Online showing is generally free, but some club-run shows require an entrance fee or paid membership. Shows run through social networks are almost always free, but rarely have material prizes.

Photo showing may also be preferred for models which may not be in a suitable condition for live showing; this is often referred as Photo Show Quality (PSQ) as opposed to Live Show Quality (LSQ). These terms are often used when selling models in order to indicate their suitability for showing. They may also be referred to as Live-Show Proven (LSP) to indicate they have been placed in a class in a live show; such models may come with any rosettes/ribbons that they have won.
