= Model horse =

Inanimate replicas of real horses

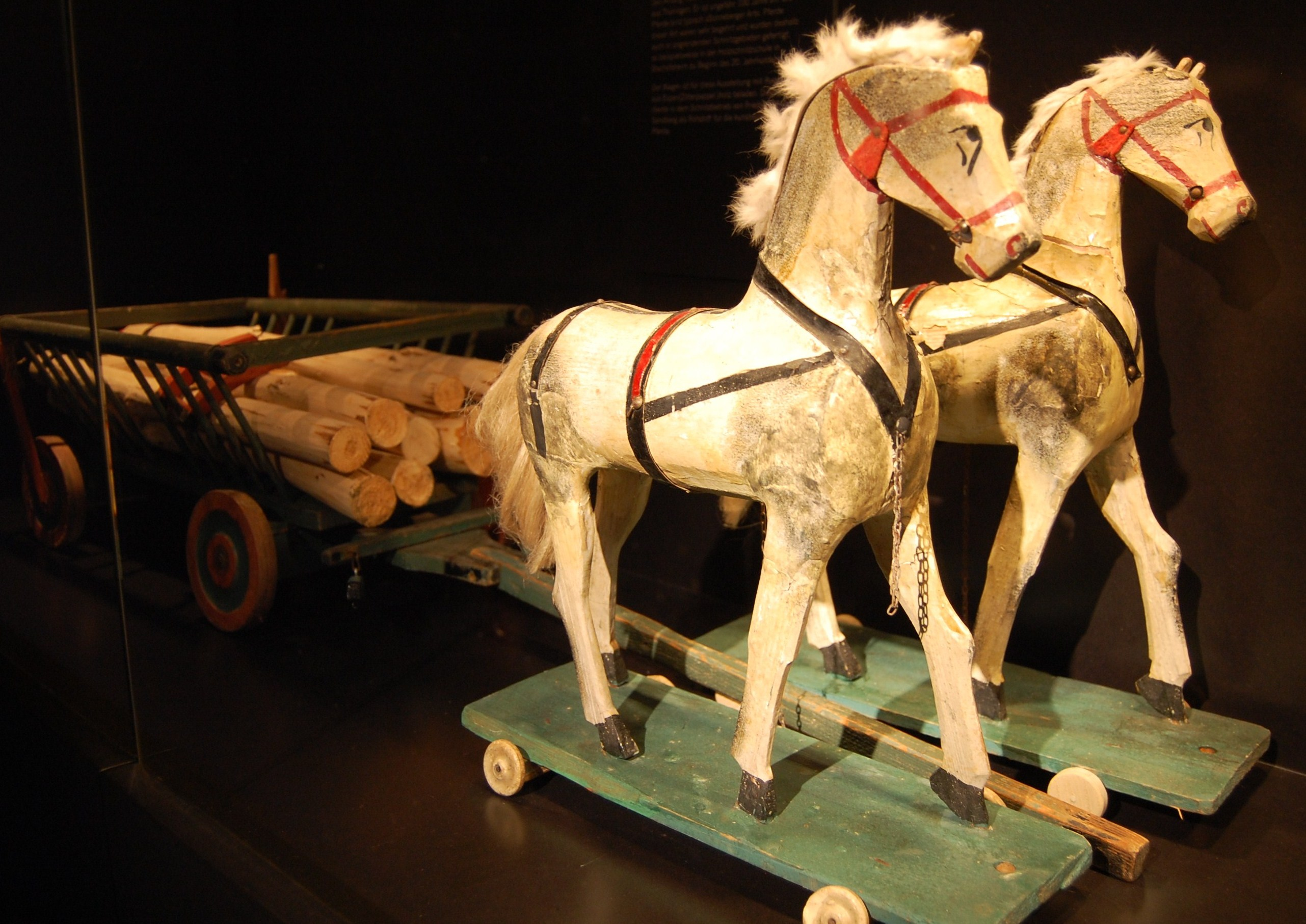
Wooden horse figurines

Model horses are scale replicas of real horses. They originated simultaneously – but independently – in the United States, Canada, and the United Kingdom, followed later by Sweden (UK-influenced), Germany (US-influenced), and Australia. They encompass a wide variety of fanbase activities, from those who simply like to collect, to those who show their models at model horse shows. Unlike model cars or trains, model horse collectibles do not need to be assembled from kits, although they can be altered to the collector's liking.

== Brief history ==
In the late 1960s, UK collectors came together through PONY magazine, and several clubs and newsletters were born, the most important being The Postal Pony Club. From this was created the Lindfield Model Showing Association and later Model Horse News (MHN), a bi-monthly magazine which ran until 1989. In 1979, The International Arabist magazine appeared, which though restricted to Arab horses and their descendants, was the first magazine to actively seek to unite hobbyists from around the world. While MHN remained largely in the original tradition of Julips, etc., TIA promoted realism through custom Breyers. TIA changed its name to Model Horse International (MHI) to reflect its move away from purely Arabian interest, but the magazine folded around 1989. MHN also folded around this time, but was replaced by Model Horses Unlimited (MHU) catering for both realistic and more traditional models, and which is still in existence today.

During the 1960s, hobbyists such as Ellen Hitchins, Simone Smiljanic, and Marney Walerius began to organize photo shows. One of the earliest known clubs was the IMHA, or International Model Horse Association, which was run by Hitchins and Smiljanic. Many young hobbyists got their start after reading a short article about model horse collecting, which was published in the March 1969 issue of Western Horseman magazine. In the 1970s, US model horse collectors decided that their horses should be doing something else than just sitting on a shelf. They began to seek each other out, and early model horse magazines such as Breyer's Just About Horses and Model Horse Showers Journal were the means for collectors to socialize. Realism became the goal and the hobby grew a larger fanbase. With more techniques being shared, the shift in realism became more apparent. For example, an early bridle might have been made out of string. Today it would be made from leather, and include actual miniature bits.

Clubs also formed as an outlet for collectors. Most clubs are devoted to particular breeds, performance activities (such as racing, eventing etc.) or regions, and just like real horse clubs, there are year-end awards, club events, point programs and newsletters for members.

== Brand history ==
The earliest popular brands of mass-produced model horses in the UK and the US strongly influenced the collecting and showing trends in these two countries - the latex-bodied and haired Julips in the UK, and the injection moulded, hard plastic Breyers in the United States.

=== UK brands ===
Model horses have long been popular toys, mainly as mounts for soldiers or figures for model farms - essentially accessories for action figures. In 1920, Britains Ltd became one of the first companies to mass-produce these types of figures. Over the years their range of equine figures expanded though they remained generic action figures; Roy Selwyn-Smith created some very detailed 54 mm ('mini') horses for Britains Ltd.

Julip Horses Ltd, in 1947, created the first mass-produced, stand-alone equine figures. Originally, Julips were stuffed soft toys in the tradition of companies such as Edith Reynolds, but later switched to hand-casting in latex (Julip Originals). Other companies such as Isis, Pegasus, and Otway, soon released their own lines of latex composition (the forerunner of resin) equines. Pamela du Boulay took the latex models to the next level with the creation of Rydal models in 1969 - highly accurate, airbrushed sculptures, each an artist original.

In 2008, Helen and Alice Moore launched a line of detailed latex models, the Equorum Model Horse Stud. Hobby artist Donna Chaney, known for her porcelain figures, introduced a small number of latex equine molds known as RubberNedz in 2015.

Many toy companies produce plastic equine figures as companions or accessories and a few of these have dedicated equine lines. One of these earlier companies was Dream Ponies, a product of Swallow Horsetoys. In 1971, they released a small range of injection moulded plastic equine models and accessories; Dream Ponies was later sold and re-launched as Magpie Models. Other brands with a significant following include My Beautiful Horses by Vivid Imaginations; Plastech, manufactures of Thelwell Pony figures; and Sindy, a British version of Barbie which included a variety of horses in their product line.

In 2015, Utterly Horses, the largest model horse distributor in the UK, announced the creation of a new model horse company, CopperFox Model Horses. The mission of this new enterprise is to produce accurate and high quality examples of British breeds which are underrepresented in the plastic arena dominated by USA-based companies.

Ceramic horses are also popular, though more fragile collectibles. Companies such as Beswick, Border Fine Arts (ceramic and resin), Alchemy Ceramics – later purchased by Animal Artistry, Melba Ware and many others offer a variety of equine figures.

=== US brands ===
In the late 1940s - early 1950s, Hartland Collectibles and Breyer Animal Creations (now a division of Reeves International) began producing realistic injection moulded plastic model horses. Both companies' first models were standing western horses next to or over a clock.

Most of Breyer's original horses, dogs and cattle were sculpted by Chris Hess, though many artists have contributed to create a wide variety of breeds and poses. Breyer Animal Creations hosts BreyerFest, a weekend-long celebration of the product every year at the Kentucky Horse Park in Lexington, Kentucky. Breyer Horses traditionally come in five scales, from largest to smallest: Traditional (1:9), Classic (1:12), Little Bit/Paddock Pal (1:24), Stablemate (1:32), and Mini Whinny (1:64). A 1:6 scale model was added in 2014, though it is unknown whether this scale group will be expanded and given a name. In addition to their fully hard plastic line, Breyer also produces haired 'toy' models, soft toys, ceramic and resin models, books, ornaments, and craft kits.

Hartland Collectibles changed ownership many times throughout their history and suffered devastating flooding in 1986 and 1994 which damaged product and machinery. The latest purchase took place in 2001 and production ceased again around 2008.

In the mid-1990s, Peter Stone, son of Sam Stone who originally helped create Breyer Animal Creations, worked for Breyer most of his life but eventually parted ways and started his own company. Stone Horses are known for a handful of molds released in a wide range of special, limited edition runs and collectible decorator colors, as well as turning a popular Quarter Horse resin by Carol Williams into plastic. Today Stone and Breyer horses are the top two popular plastic model horse brands.

Companies such Grand Champion, Blue Ribbon, Creata, and many others produce some form of model horse, but these are generally considered too toy-like to be of major interest to collectors.

Hagen-Renaker is a California-based company which produces model horse figures. These figures are highly collectible and a number of the molds were leased by Breyer for production in plastic.

=== Artist resins ===
Limited edition artist resins (usually original sculptures rather than customs), first began to appear in the 1980s. The very first were castings taken from customized Breyers, issued by Black Horse Ranch owned by the late Karen Grimm. Carol William's famous "Quarter Horse 1" or "RRQH1" ("RR" for "Rio Rondo", the name of Williams' modeling enterprise) was one of the first to be cast from an original sculpture.

Resin models - high-quality castings of an original artist's sculpture - are typically sold unpainted, ready to finish by the customer. They took the hobby by storm in the 1990s, and are very popular and much-sought after today. A resin can be an affordable way to own a favorite artist's work, with the price dependent on the rarity of the piece. Some resins are released in highly limited editions of 50 pieces or less. Such models sell out rapidly, and might be resold with higher secondary-market prices.

== Model horse activities ==
=== Collecting ===
Due to the vast amount of model horses available, some hobbyists collect only one kind of breed, scale or particular mold. Most model horses are in the 1:9 scale, while others are no bigger than mice. Usually a model is released in a particular color for a number of years or a limited run. The model horse company may decide to make portrait models of famous horses as well, such as Secretariat and Man o' War. Having a collection of several color versions of one mold is referred to as a "conga line". Hobbyists simply collect what they like, and others may collect in hopes of selling at a profit later on. There is no guarantee that models will increase in value over time. Since the advent of eBay, comparing prices has become much easier, so prices have fallen. Buyers can now purchase a horse for much less than what it was originally bought.

While the original scope of collecting may have focused on plastic horses, they may now be made of resin or ceramic. Common brands are: Breyer Horses, Paradise Horses, Stone Horses, Hagen-Renaker, Royal Doulton, North Light, Grand Champion and Schleich. While most model horses are sold as toys, some, like resins, are delicate, much more expensive and are not made for children. Common plastic model horses may be bought from toy stores, tack shops, authorized dealers or other collectors. Prices range from a few dollars to many thousands for an artist resin.

Some hobbyists also collect Model Horse catalogs, magazines and promotional items.

=== Customizing ===
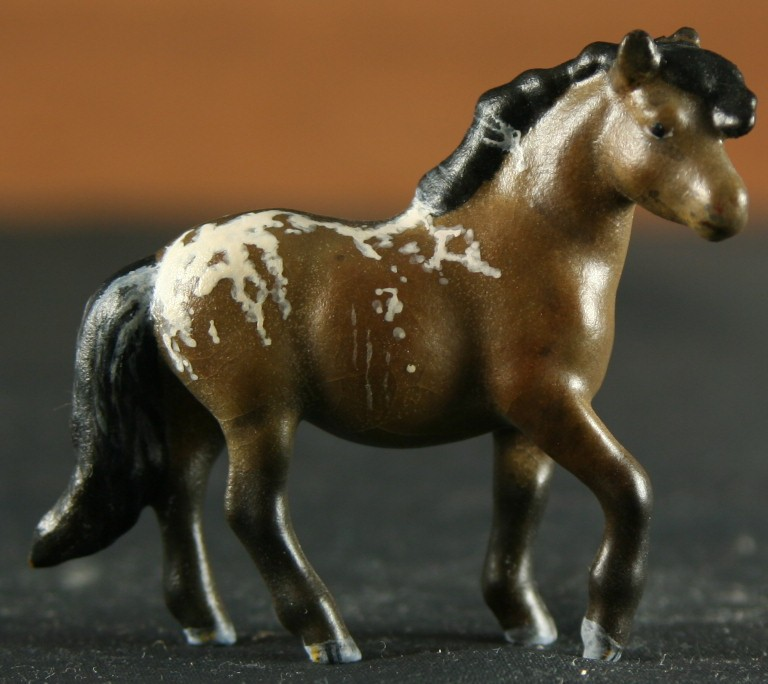
Custom repaint of a Hagen-Renaker Mini Shetland Pony Mare (circa 2005). Acrylics and pastels on ceramic.

Not content with factory produced models, hobbyists took to remaking factory-made models by adding hair, removing tails or altering the position or color. Many of these early customs are considered crude by today's standards. These early models often had fake fur manes and tails, or were painted with spray paint and even permanent markers. Legs were moved by heating plastic with hair dryers or candles.

However, in the late 1970s, British artists finally gained access to Breyers (which were not then commercially available in the UK), and began to rework them using more sophisticated techniques in a deliberate attempt to replicate the realism of the du Boulay Rydals. This comprised the use of airbrushes, fine mohair tops and epoxy putty for re-sculpting. Today these techniques and the term "customizing" have been adopted worldwide to become effectively hobby standard.

Acrylics (brushed or air-brushed), oil paints, brushed-on pastel dust, and etching away the original finish paint with an x-acto knife are all common materials and methods for altering the appearance of a model. Coloured pencils, watercolour (pencil and paint), and even ink are sometimes used as well. The preference for sculpted or hair manes and tails goes in and out of vogue and can vary by region as well. Mohair is generally used, though some artists use glue-coated embroidery thread to great effect creating something between a sculpted and haired appearance.

Many sculpting pastes have been used over the years with varying levels of success and durability. Wood putty and plumber's epoxy was most commonly used in the beginning, but now new epoxy-type products are available which have been designed for artistic use. Products such as Apoxie Sculpt and Gapoxio have longer drying times, a finer texture, and more flexibility than the earlier sculpting materials.

Customized models can range from simple repaints of an otherwise unaltered model to those which have been so thoroughly manipulated and re-sculpted as to make the original form totally unrecognizable. Many artists make their living from customizing models, with certain artists widely sought after.

=== Showing the model horse ===
Model horse showing has two ways in which to participate - photo showing (online or postal) and live showing. Photo showing is convenient for people who aren't able to travel or don't live near other collectors. Showholders publish a classlist and invite people to enter for a nominal fee. The shower then takes photos of their horse, usually against a background. On the back of the photo, the horse's vitals are recorded along with the shower's address. A piece of tape is also placed on the back, on which the shower writes down the numbers of the classes in which the horse will be entered. Once the showholder receives all the entries, They are sorted by class numbers and begin judging. A showholder may place a horse based on quality of photo, accuracy of breed depiction, and condition. Usually championships and reserves are offered as well. Sometimes ribbons or small prizes are sent to the show entrants along with the returned photographs and show results. More recently, photo shows posted on the Internet have eliminated the cost of postage and long wait for returns.

Live showing is much different. Here again the showholder publishes a classlist and invites other showers to attend. The show is usually held in a large space such as a hotel or arena, and entrants travel in person to attend. Each shower usually gets a table to use as a "home base" in the show hall. The "rings" are tables with ring numbers, where showers place their horses as classes are called. Live shows classlists are usually divided between original finish and customized models, and some also have separate divisions for china figurines, artist resins, and very-rare original finish. Live shows frequently have multiple judges and judge several classes at once to accommodate the long classlists. As in photo showing, judges consider condition and breed correctness. Live shows may also include collectibility classes, or may judge breed classes simultaneously for collectibility as well, in which models are thereby evaluated on the basis of rarity and condition, verses breed correctness. Any profits from the shows are often donated to animal-related charities.

If a shower belongs to a club, they may record points earned from their horses' placings for year-end awards. There are many clubs that hold periodic—often monthly—photo or online shows that allow members the opportunity to earn points for their horses that may be applied to end-of-the-year and cumulative awards.

NAN cards are also sought after. These pink and green cards allow a particular horse to enter the North American Nationals (NAN), a yearly show organized by the North American Model Horse Show Association (NAMHSA). The show and the qualification cards carry a lot of prestige in the hobby world - a model which is "NAN qualified" goes up in value. In the UK the Model Equine Championships (MECs) have a similar concept to NAN and have been running since 1998.

Postal showing was the original method of showing, where a horse's details were sent to a judge and places were awarded by rolling dice. Now postal showing is more usually the preserve of performance disciplines such as racing or dressage, and the model events often mirror real events. Places may be awarded by pairing a model with a real participant whose luck it shares, or in the case of racing, with reference to a sophisticated handicapping system.

=== Props and tack ===
Hobbyists also use props, tack and riders. It is important that props and tack are in scale to the model for added realism.

Props are anything which might enhance a scene, such as dogs, jumps, trees, trail elements, backgrounds and fences. Some classes such as jumping, roping, and trail require the use of props.

Dolls range from pre-packaged jointed dolls, to one-of-a-kind creations by skilled dollmakers. They currently are optional for performance showing in the United States, elsewhere, however, they are required.

Hobby tack covers the entire range of real horse tack, from numnahs to full saddle sets; from simple barn halters to extravagant multiple horse harness hitches; and from stable blankets to hand-stitched Arabian horse costumes. They are made out of a variety of materials such as leather hide, leather lace, satin and grosgrain ribbon, jewelry chain, and various fabrics. Hardware can be made by hand out of wire, or cast metal such as pewter and white bronze. Much research goes into making high-quality tack, with some tack makers accumulating reference libraries of online image folders and books. Tack can be made from scratch, or using kits. Knowledge of leather stamping, carving, dying, and sewing are all skills the model horse tackmaker uses in his or her craft.

=== Pedigreeing ===
In the pursuit of realism, many hobbyists also research and give their models pedigrees and names. Pedigree assignment—commonly abbreviated "PA"—is a way to learn about different breeds and creating progeny. Some pedigrees are researched from real horses or other models. Model horse breeders may offer their horse's parentage for a nominal fee and usually issue a certificate to the foal's owner. Some clubs keep records of real mares and their open years for members who want to make sure that the model they PA from living parents does not have the same dam and foaling year as a model belonging to another member. In keeping with the hobby's attempt to maintain realism, collectors assigning pedigrees to models usually try to use only years that a real mare did not have a foal, or, in the case of scarce breeds, a year that she had a foal that was gelded (and thus could not reproduce).

== See also ==
- Animal figurine
- Fashion Star Fillies
- My Little Pony
