= Julip Horses Ltd =

UK model horse company

Julip Horses Ltd. was a United Kingdom-based company that produced a range of 1/12-scale model horses. Julip Horses Ltd. was established in 1945 by Lavender Dower (b. 1907 d. 2003) as a family-run business. They manufactured model horses and accessories, originally made of leather, then latex, then plastic. In 2013, the company was split. Julip Originals continues operating as of 2024; Julip Horses Ltd. stopped trading in 2016.

== Overview ==
The first models were made out of chamois leather by Dower, who trained as a sculptor at the Royal Academy. Lead from London buildings bombed during World War II was used to make the model's legs. Five years later, the company switched to making the horses out of latex, the same material used to make the current line of Julip Originals.

Models were sold from a shop in a building owned by Dower in Beauchamp Place, London. Beauchamp Place is part of the smart Knightsbridge shopping area and not far from Harrods. The building and business was purchased and funded with an inheritance Dower received from her brother-in-law, the author and sportsman, Kenneth Gandar-Dower, who died at the end of World War Two. The premises were also used as a manufacturing facility with women, including Dower's war time Sergeant Major, employed to produce the products.

Dower sold the company in the 1950s.

Lead continued to be used to provide the support and flexibility in the legs of the latex horses until at least the early 1960s, when lead as a component of children's toys was banned in the UK for safety reasons.

Julip was just one of several companies producing cast-latex model horses in the 1950s and 1960s, but the only one to continue in business past 1968. The company's main rival was known as Isis, whose products were preferred by serious collectors of the period for their greater detail. Other companies included Pegasus and Otway, and in the late 1960s the internationally renowned animalier artist Pamela du Boulay began her sculpting career with a range of exquisite latex models sold under the 'Rydal' name.

The production process for latex models is simple, and similar to the early stages of pottery production. Plaster moulds are made from a 'master' model. When the plaster is completely dry, a mix of liquid latex and an inert 'filler' is poured into the mould and left to stand until a coating of latex has developed around the inside of the mould. The remaining liquid latex is poured away for reuse, and the casting allowed to dry out until it is firm enough to be removed from the mould. This part of the process is identical to the way ceramics are cast. With the casting removed, the plaster mould is left to dry out, and cannot be reused until 100% dry once more. Each casting progressively destroys the interior of the mould, so after a relatively limited number of casts, the mould has to be discarded and new ones made from the master. This explains why each individual Julip is different even from other examples of the same breed and from the same mould.

Once the casting is air-dry, it is then heat-cured or 'vulcanised'. This stabilises the latex, but if the vulcanising process is too short or carried out at too low a temperature, the latex can become unstable again - this is one of the reasons why Julips can become "gooey".

Julips were made at the Beauchamp Street premises until c.1968, when production moved to Romsey in Hampshire. Sales continued through Beauchamp Place, though now the ground floor of the shop became Julie Loughnan Children's Clothing and Julip moved into the now-legendary basement store premises, with its wallpaper depicting fashionable Victorian carriages. For many years, however, models appeared in an advertising case on the pavement in Beauchamp Place, at right-angles to the shop frontage and so easily visible to eager shoppers.

At this time the company was owned by a couple named Heath, who featured in an article on Julip which appeared in the 1973 PONY Magazine Annual.

Although Julip issued a detailed catalogue depicting all the models in their range in the mid 1960s, from 1967 onwards this was replaced by a typewritten sheet that simply listed the models and accessories, and which was accompanied by a printed sheet of photos which did not identify which model was which. This made shopping by mail order a complete lottery - customers were never exactly sure what they would receive until the sturdy brown cardboard box actually arrived.

During the 1980s the company was purchased by Annabel Levaux, and - after the introduction of mass-produced vinyl horses (Julip Horse of the Year - see below) - the latex range was relaunched as 'Julip Originals'. The Originals are now manufactured in the Berkshire.

Julip still makes their models by hand in their workshop in Berkshire. Being made of latex, old Originals often show signs of age related damage. Common problems include worn paint and gummy or brittle latex. This particularly affects the feet, ears, and nose, so vintage models need more care and gentle handling. Today, Julips can be ordered through the main office to your specifications in a mould and colour of your choice. They can even be copied from pictures of real horses or drawings. As they are handmade none are alike.

Latex Julips should be stored away from sources of heat (e.g. radiators) and sunlight - both heat and ultra-violet light "rot" rubber. Julips exposed to these conditions either dry out and become powdery ("perish"), or become gooey. Gooey models can be re-stabilised by storage in a dark, cold place for some time, but the process make take up several years to complete. A 'quick fix' for minor gooey spots is to apply superglue (cyanoacrylate adhesive) to the affected area, but this is not always a long-term cure and glue application may have to be repeated after some years.

Fabric should NEVER be applied to gooey areas of latex, as it is almost impossible to remove without further damage and makes proper restoration at a later date much more complicated.

In 1989 a new range of Julip horses was launched: the Horse of the Year range. These models were much more solid, being made first of rubber and then of solid plastic, making them much more durable for play than the Originals. Some of this range are sold with accessories, and other miniature stable-yard accessories are available separately. Models have been made in this range as portraits of real horses, such as Horse and Pony's Freddie, Mousie, one of the Julip Director Annabel's own horses or Ted the Clydesdale foal. Some of these portrait models, such as ILPH Bob the Cob, have been sold with some of the profits going to the charity. Currently on sale is the set Rosie and Rocket, some of the profits of which are going to the Mark Davies Injured Riders Fund. In the Originals range, there was a Welsh Cob model of "Oliver" who was being sold to raise funds for the RDA.

Julip collectors can customize the cheaper, less valuable HOTYs and sometimes Originals. They can be rehaired, resculpted and repainted with same qualities of other models.

In September 2013, Julip was split into two different companies - Julip Originals and Julip Horses Ltd. Julip Horses Ltd focuses on the HOTY (plastic) models, whereas Julip Originals focuses on the latex models. Despite sharing a name and history, neither companies have anything to do with each other, so great care must be taken in making sure that one is addressing the right owner.
