= Grain filler =

A grain filler (also called pore filler or paste wood filler) is a woodworking product used to achieve a smooth-textured wood finish by filling pores in the wood grain. It is used particularly on open-grained woods such as oak, mahogany and walnut, where building up multiple layers of standard finish is ineffective or impractical.

== Composition ==
Grain fillers generally consist of three basic components: a binder, a bulking agent, and a solvent. The binder is a wood finish, and in the case of oil-based fillers is typically a blend of oil and varnish. Water-based fillers use acrylic or urethane. The type of binder determines the solvent: oil-based fillers usually use mineral spirits, while water-based fillers use water. Both types commonly employ silica as a bulking agent, as it resists shrinking and swelling caused by changes in temperature and humidity. Other bulking agents may include quartz powder, wood flour, and talc.

== Use ==
Woodworkers apply grain filler before other finishes on open-grained woods to achieve a "full finish" with a smooth, reflective surface. Species such as ash, oak, mahogany, and walnut fall into this category, while tight-grained woods such as maple and cherry can achieve similar results with just a few coats of finish.

Before application, the surface is sanded and puttied to conceal imperfections, which would otherwise be accentuated by the grain filler. The filler is brushed both with and against the grain and excess is scraped off. After partial drying, the woodworker typically uses a piece of burlap to remove remaining excess.

== See also ==
- Wood finishing
- Wood stain
- Varnish
- Shellac
- Lacquer
- Wood putty
- Filler (materials)
