= Carnegie collection =

Line of scale model dinosaur figures

The Carnegie Collection was a series of authentic replicas based on dinosaurs and other extinct prehistoric creatures, using fossils featured at the Carnegie Museum of Natural History as references. They were produced by Florida-based company Safari Ltd., known for their hand-painted replicas, from 1988 to 2015, and became known as "the world’s premier line of scale model dinosaur figures."

== Description ==
65 models representing 53 species of dinosaurs and other prehistoric animals were produced for the line. Each of the models was hand-painted, ensuring that no two copies of the same model are identical. Each model was sculpted by artist Forest Rogers and authenticated by paleontologists associated with the Carnegie Museum, such as Matt Lamanna, as well as various species-specific experts. Most of the animals were sculpted at a 1:40 scale (where one inch on the model represents 40 inches on the real creature), although some models representing smaller creatures were produced at a larger scale. Models in the collection range greatly in size from 24 inches long (original Diplodocus) to only three inches long (original Dimetrodon) with all shapes and sizes represented in-between. On the underside of each model is information detailing its name, year of initial production, and copyright information.

The models feature an informational hang tag providing scientific details about the animal represented by the replica. In some cases, the dinosaurs were packaged in cardboard display boxes, in which case a small booklet featuring information on each dinosaur featured in the collection was included in lieu of the hang tags. In some instances, two or three models would be packaged together in a box. Examples include Dimetrodon and Deinonychus, Protoceratops and Euoplocephalus, Apatosaurus and Apatosaurus Baby, Elasmosaurus and Mosasaurus, and Australopithecus Male/Female pair and Smilodon. The boxes are not often seen today, and most of the time the dinosaurs are found free of packaging. Also produced for the collection was a specially designed display "mountain". The display featured multiple tiers upon which the pieces in the collection could be placed in a variety of creative ways. This display was touted primarily to retailers in order to encourage sales of the replicas, but the display has also become popular with collectors.

The partnership between the Carnegie Museum and Safari Ltd. began in 1987. Production of the Carnegie Collection began in 1988, when Forest Rogers was first contracted to sculpt the models. Some were released in 1988, and all 17 of these initial models were released by 1989, and several models were added to the line each year after that. The line ended in March 2015, after a 28-year partnership.

== Models ==
All models released in the first ten years of the Carnegie Collection's history. All of the models that received updated sculpts in 1996 here are seen in their updated molds, except for Stegosaurus.

Prior to 1996, each model was cast from a grey material and covered in a coat of paint corresponding to the base color of the finished model. The details of the model were then painted onto this layer of paint, resulting in a loss of the finer sculpting detail due to the thickness of the paint on each finished model. Beginning in 1996, each new model was cast from a pigmented material corresponding to the base color of the finished model. The details of the model were then painted directly onto this material, resulting in greater detail and a less shiny appearance. In 1997, most older models received updated molds that utilized color vinyl, and some were repainted with new color schemes, while a few others were retired. Despite the modifications, the eighteen remaining models retained the same model numbers as their predecessors. This became the cause of some confusion as a single model number was used to refer to two versions of the same model, which was particularly noticeable with the new color schemes for Stegosaurus, Triceratops, and Pachycephalosaurus. Color name tags were also designed and attached to each model in place of the original folded paper name tags.

In 2007, twelve of the models again received new color schemes. These models, however, did not retain the same model numbers as their predecessors. New model numbers were assigned to distinguish them as new versions.

1988

- #400-01 Stegosaurus (1:40 scale, renumbered to #4000-01 in 1994, retired in 2007)
- #401-01 Tyrannosaurus rex (1:40 scale, renumbered to #4001-01 in 1994, retired in 2015)
- #402-01 Brachiosaurus (1:40 scale, renumbered to #4002-01 in 1994, retired in 2007)
- #403-01 Apatosaurus (1:40 scale, renumbered to #4003-01 in 1994, retired in 2014)
- #404-01 Apatosaurus baby (1:40 scale, renumbered to #4004-01 in 1994, retired in 2014)
- #405-01 Parasaurolophus (1:40 scale, renumbered to #4005-01 in 1994, retired in 2007)
- #406-01 Triceratops (1:40 scale, renumbered to #4006-01 in 1994, retired in 2007)
- #407-01 Allosaurus (1:40 scale, renumbered to #4007-01 in 1994, retired in 2007)
- #408-01 Australopithecus male (1:10 scale, retired in 1996)
- #409-01 Australopithecus female (1:10 scale, retired in 1996)
- #410-01 Diplodocus (1:40 scale, renumbered to #4010-01 in 1994, retired in 2007)
- #411-01 Maiasaura on eggs (1:40 scale, retired in 1996)
- #412-01 Euoplocephalus (1:40 scale, renumbered to #4012-01 in 1994, retired in 1997)
- #413-01 Dimetrodon (1:40 scale, renumbered to #4013-01 in 1994, retired in 1997)
- #414-01 Pteranodon (1:40 scale, renumbered to #4014-01 in 1994, retired in 2011)
- #415-01 Protoceratops (1:40 scale, renumbered to #4015-01 in 1994, retired in 1996)
- #416-01 Smilodon (1:10 scale, renumbered to #4016-01 in 1994, retired in 1997)

1990

- #417-01 Deinonychus (1:40 scale, renumbered to #4017-01 in 1994, retired in 1997)
- #418-01 Pachycephalosaurus (1:40 scale, renumbered to #4018-01 in 1994, retired in 2002)

1991

- #419-01 Elasmosaurus (1:40 scale, renumbered to #4019-01 in 1994, retired in 2007)
- #420-01 Mosasaurus (1:40 scale, renumbered to #4020-01 in 1994, retired in 1999)

1992

- #421-01 Iguanodon (1:40 scale, renumbered to #4021-01 in 1994, retired in 2007)
- #422-01 Spinosaurus (1:40 scale, renumbered to #4022-01 in 1994, retired in 2007)

1993

- #423-01 Corythosaurus (1:40 scale, renumbered to #4023-01 in 1994, retired in 2009)

1994

- #4024-01 Dilophosaurus pair (1:40 scale, retired in 2009)

1995

- #4025-01 Plateosaurus (1:40 scale, retired in 2010)

1996

- #4026-01: Deinosuchus (1:40 scale, retired in 2015)
- #4027-01: Maiasaura and nest (1:40 scale, retired in 2015)

1997

- #4028-01: Carnotaurus (1:40 scale, retired in 2007)
- #4029-01: Kronosaurus (1:40 scale, retired in 2015)
- #4030-01: Saltasaurus (1:40 scale, retired in 2015)

1998

- #4031-01: Quetzalcoatlus (1:40 scale, retired in 2007)
- #4032-01: Deltadromeus agilis (1:40 scale, retired in 2009)
- #4033-01: Baryonyx (1:40 scale, retired in 2014)

1999

- #4034-01: Psittacosaurus (1:10 scale, retired in 2004)
- #4035-01: 10th Anniversary Commemorative Tyrannosaurus (1:40 scale, retired in 2015) – Updated sculpt of #4001-01

2000

- #4036-01: Triceratops (1:40 scale, retired in 2015) – Updated sculpt of #4006-01
- #4037-01: Tanystropheus (1:10 scale, retired in 2007)

2001

- #4038-01: Dimetrodon (1:15 scale, retired in 2015) – Updated sculpt of #413-01
- #4039-01: Acrocanthosaurus (1:40 scale, retired in 2015)

2002

- #4040-01: Styracosaurus (1:40 scale, retired in 2005)
- #4041-01: Camarasaurus (1:40 scale, retired in 2015)

2003

- #4042-01: Woolly Mammoth (1:24 scale, retired in 2015)
- #4043-01: Velociraptor (1:10 scale, retired in 2007)

2004

- #4044-01: Albertosaurus (1:40 scale, retired in 2015)
- #4045-01: Sinraptor (1:40 scale, retired in 2009)

2005

- #4046-01: Oviraptor (1:10 scale, retired in 2009)
- #4047-01: Ankylosaurus (1:40 scale, retired in 2015)

2006

- #4049-01: Beipiaosaurus (1:10 scale, retired in 2015)
- #4050-01: Microraptor (1:4 scale, retired in 2015)
- #4212-01: Caudipteryx (1:4 scale, retired in 2015)
- #4213-01: Dilong (1:10 scale, retired in 2015)

2007

- #4052-01: Amargasaurus (1:40 scale, retired in 2015)
- #4053-01: Oviraptor (1:10 scale, retired in 2015) – Updated sculpt of #4046-01
- #4101-01: Tanystropheus (1:10 scale, retired in 2015) – Repaint of #4037-01
- #4106-01: Velociraptor (1:10 scale, retired in 2015) – Repaint of #4043-01
- #4108-01: Iguanodon (1:40 scale, retired in 2015) – Repaint of #4021-01
- #4109-01: Allosaurus (1:40 scale, retired in 2015) – Repaint of #4007-01
- #4110-01: Spinosaurus (1:40 scale, retired in 2015) – Repaint of #4022-01
- #4111-01: Parasaurolophus (1:40 scale, retired in 2015) – Repaint of #4005-01
- #4115-01: Triceratops (1:40 scale, retired in 2015) – Repaint of #4006-01
- #4116-01: Quetzalcoatlus (1:40 scale, retired in 2015) – Repaint of #4031-01
- #4117-01: Elasmosaurus (1:40 scale, retired in 2015) – Repaint of #4019-01
- #4118-01: Carnotaurus (1:40 scale, retired in 2013) – Repaint of #4028-01
- #4119-01: Stegosaurus (1:40 scale, retired in 2015) – Repaint of #4000-01
- #4120-01: Brachiosaurus (1:40 scale, retired in 2012) – Repaint of #4002-01

2008

- #4054-01: Diplodocus (1:40 scale, retired in 2015) – Updated sculpt of #4010-01
- #4122-01: Giganotosaurus (1:40 scale, retired in 2015)

2009

- #4215-01: Tylosaurus (1:40 scale, retired in 2015)
- #4216-01: Spinosaurus (1:40 scale, retired in 2015) – Updated sculpt of #4110-01

2010

- #4217-01: Ichthyosaurus (1:10 scale, retired in 2015)
- #4218-01: Cryolophosaurus (1:25 scale, retired in 2015)

2011

- #4126-01: Miragaia (1:30 scale, retired in 2015)
- #4123-01: Carnotaurus (1:30 scale, retired in 2015) – Updated sculpt of #4118-01

2012

- #4107-01: Brachiosaurus (1:50 scale, retired in 2015) – Updated sculpt of #4120-01

2013

- #4112-01: Concavenator (1:25 scale, retired in 2015)

2014

- #4113-01: Tyrannosaurus 25th Anniversary (1:40 scale, retired in 2015) – Updated sculpt of #4035-01

2015

- #4102-01: Velociraptor (1:10 scale, retired in 2015) – Updated sculpt of #4043-01

== See also ==
- Dinosaur
- Collectible and Collecting
- Figurine
- Scale model
- Educational toy
