= Safari Ltd =

American animal figurines and toy manufacturer

- Industry: Entertainment
- Founded: 1982; 44 years ago
- Founder: Bernard Rubel; Rosemarie Rubel
- Headquarters: Jacksonville, Florida, United States
- Area served: Worldwide
- Products: Animal figurines
- Owner: Alexandre Pariente
- Website: safariltd.com

Safari Ltd is an American family-owned manufacturer and global distributor of animal figurine toys. The company was founded in 1982 and is headquartered in Jacksonville, Florida.

The company's offerings include more than 1,000 products, including dinosaurs, dragons, and fairies.

== History ==
Safari Ltd was founded in 1982 by a German-born husband and wife team, Bernard and Rosemarie Rubel. Their goal was to aid in wildlife conservation by raising awareness of endangered species. Inspired by a deck of educational playing cards featuring photographs of endangered animals, they initially began by photographing native species in Florida and selling postcards of the photos at zoos and other attractions.

The Rubels would later return to Germany and lay eyes on the educational figurines that led them to develop the museum-quality figurines Safari manufactures today.

The company soon expanded to offer toys based on dinosaurs and prehistoric life, utilizing the paleontology community to aid in making the most scientifically accurate figure based on current research. This led to the company's partnership with the Carnegie Museum of Natural History.

Presently, Safari Ltd is run by the Rubels’ grandson Alexandre Pariente, who heads the company with his wife, Christina Pariente. Under Alexandre's tenure the company has invested more in developing online resources, including an in-house wikisource coined SafariPedia that encourages children and educators to use it in tandem with Safari Ltd products.

== Brand ==
Bernie the Gator is Safari Ltd's mascot and pays homage to founder Bernard Amadeus Rubel. The alligator is a popular animal commonly associated with the state of Florida, where Safari Ltd is headquartered.

== Design ==
All figurines are phthalate and lead-free, and adhere to worldwide testing standards.

A group of professional sculptors research each animal's anatomy prior to creating a lifelike model. This model is then sent to the manufacturer for large-scale production, and each figurine is hand painted in order to capture the animal's unique and distinctive features. Each figurine is inscribed with its name on the belly on the animal (in English) to aid in easy identification of the animal.

== Licensing Agreements ==
Safari Ltd signed a contract with the Carnegie Museum of Natural History in Pittsburgh, PA that lasted from October 1986- February 2015. The Carnegie Collection from Safari Ltd and the Carnegie Museum lasted nearly three decades.

In December 1984, the company signed a contract with the Monterey Bay Aquarium based in Monterey, CA. With this agreement, Safari Ltd created a scaled Sea Life collection designed using the expertise of Monterey Bay Aquarium's marine biologists and Safari Ltd's expert sculptors. Together, they have created a collection of figurines which is updated based on current scientific research.

== Awards and recognition ==
Best Toy – Toddler in Reader's Favorites, Baby & Children's Product News (Won: 2017)

Top Ten Prehistoric Animals of 2016, DinoToyBlog (Won, First Place: 2016)

Healthiest Employer in South Florida, South Florida Business Journal (Nominated: 2017)
