= Wood putty =

Wood-based sealant

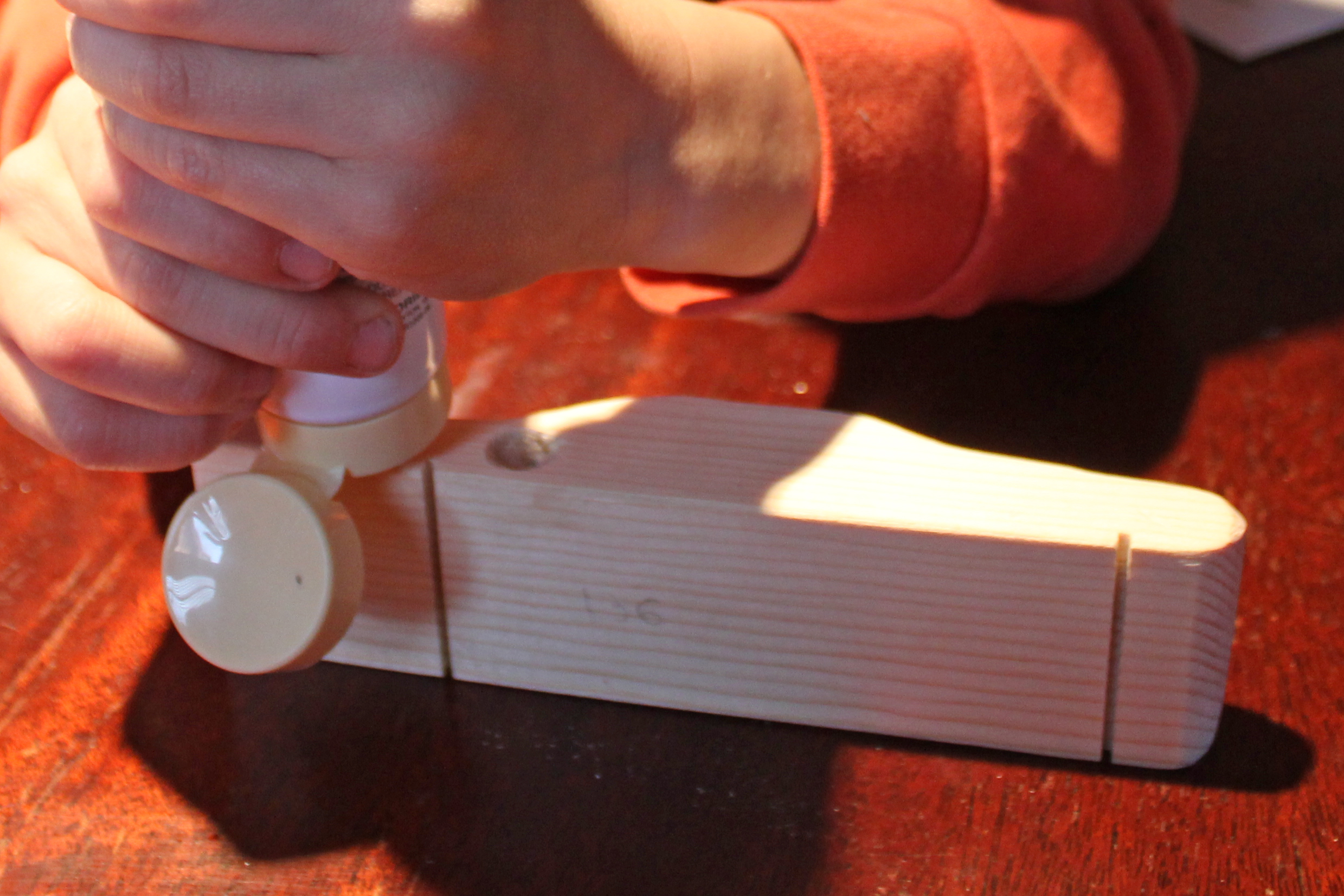
Person using wood putty to construct a pinewood derby car, 2011

Wood putty, also called plastic wood, is a substance used to fill imperfections, such as nail holes, in wood prior to finishing. It is often composed of wood dust combined with a binder that dries and a diluent (thinner), and, sometimes, pigment. Pore fillers used for large flat surfaces such as floors or table tops generally contain silica instead of or in addition to wood dust. Pores can also be filled using multiple coats of the final finish rather than a pore filler.

The main problem in using putty is matching the colour of the putty to that of the wood. Putties are usually sanded after they dry before applying the finish.

Many different brands, types, and colours are commercially available. Binders include lacquer, water-base, and linseed oil. Some woodworkers make their own putty using fine sanding dust (not sawdust, which is too coarse) with wood glue or a wood finish such as shellac.

DAP Products owns the registered trademark for Plastic Wood.

== See also ==
- Grain filler
- Putty
- Spackling paste
- Polyfilla
