= Animal figurine =

Figurines that represent animals

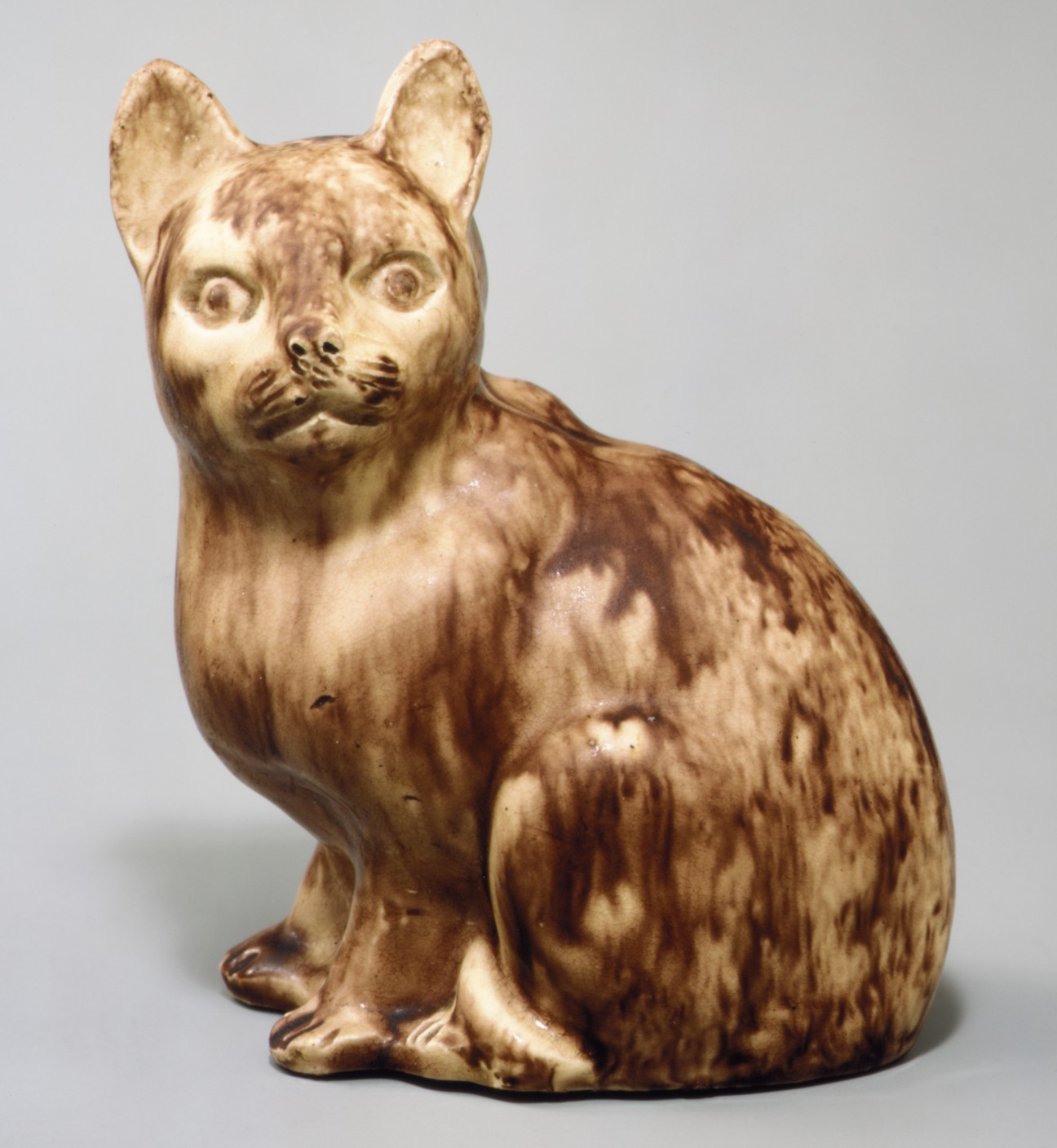
Staffordshire figure of a cat, c. 1750

Animal figurines are figurines that represent animals, either as decorative pieces, toys or collectibles. They are often made of plastic, ceramics, or metal.

== Types ==
Animal figurines are most commonly made from plastic, ceramics, or various types of metal. Historically, some toy animal figurines were made of lead, and were made by several manufacturers, including Britains Limited. Companies that manufacture realistic models include Safari Ltd, Schleich and Bullyland. Animal figurines are also created from crystal glass.

The earthenware Staffordshire figures of the 18th and 19th centuries were enormously popular, with Staffordshire dog figurines the most popular; these were typically made in pairs. Wade Ceramics created a line of porcelain animal (and occasionally other) figurines that were distributed as premiums in Red Rose Tea in Canada and the USA between 1973 and 2018. They have become popular collectables.

== Collecting ==
K. Narayanan is the Limca Book of Records (an Indian record book) holder for the largest collection of miniature animal replicas, numbering 1,773 as of June 12, 2011.

== See also ==
- Model horse
- Model figure
- California pottery (section Figurines)
