= Breyer Animal Creations =

Toy company

- Type: Division
- Industry: Toy manufacturing
- Founded: 1950
- Headquarters: Chicago, Illinois, United States
- Products: Model horses; Animal models; Porcelain horse figures; Model tack accessories; Horse-related structures (e.g., stables and barns)
- Parent: Reeves International, Inc.
- Website: www.breyerhorses.com

Vintage Breyer horses, c. 1972

Breyer Animal Creations (commonly referred to as simply Breyer) is primarily a manufacturer of model horses. Founded in 1950, the company, now a division of Reeves International, Inc, specializes in model horses made from cellulose acetate, a form of plastic, and produces other animal models from the same material as well. Less well known are its porcelain horse figures, which are aimed at the adult collector market. The company also produces model tack accessories and horse-related structures, such as stables, barns, and grooming implements in scale to its model horses.

== History ==
Breyer Animal Creations was founded in 1950 in Chicago, Illinois, as Breyer Molding Company. It gained recognition when commissioned by F.W. Woolworth to create a horse statue (now known as the # 57 Western Horse) to adorn a mantel clock. It was approximately 1:9 scale and the model was retained as payment for molding the parts. Orders began to roll in for the horse only and the Breyer Animal Creations company was founded. Since then, Breyer has become a leader in producing model horses.

In 1984, Reeves International acquired Breyer Animal Creations and spent the next 20 years completing its transformation from toy distribution to manufacturing. Model horses are sold through independent distributors and the Breyer website.

While Breyer products were originally manufactured in the United States, production now takes place in China.

== Production processes ==
Each horse is cast in a two to three piece mold. Both halves are then put together and the seams are sanded and polished. Markings and color patterns are usually obtained by using a stencil known as a mask, although most older models were airbrushed by hand, with markings such as undefined socks or a piebald face merely left unpainted. Most detailing, such as eye-whites (common on 1950s and 1960s models and now enjoying a resurgence in modern models), brands, or other individual markings are hand-painted. Sometimes, a variation in the paint job occurs, the reasons for which is rarely known. For example, there is a common mold, typically called the Proud Arabian Stallion (abbreviated PAS by collectors), that for many years was produced by Breyer with a dappled gray coat and a gray mane, tail and hooves. However, for some unknown reason, a few of these models came from the factory with black manes, tails, and hooves, and black socks or stockings. These rare models are considered variations of the Dapple Grey PAS, and are very valuable compared to the regular model, which is quite common. They were later determined to be their own unique color model, and not a variation of the original PAS.

== Collector value of products ==
One of the rare models are the few Breyer releases that are one-of-a-kind (OOAK), which are always given out as prizes or sold off at auction for charity at the yearly Breyerfest gatherings.

== Collector Clubs ==
In 2012, Breyer introduced its Collector Club. The Collector Club offers access to different specialty clubs, including the Vintage Collector Club, Stablemates Collector Club, and The Premiere Collection. It also offers members access to limited run models, exclusive sales, giveaways, special events, and an annual Just About Horses magazine.

The Premier Collection debuts 3 brand new sculptures annually. These models are painted to a higher standard than regular run models. This club also includes a bonus Stablemates model which are either brand new pieces or the first miniaturized version of a Traditional scale favorite. Every member also receives a sketch of the first Premier model.

The Vintage Club is a limited-membership club that focuses on a blend of models, decorations, and finishes from the past and today. The Vintage Club releases four models throughout the year. Each model comes with its own Certificate of Authenticity.

The Stablemates Club debuts a new sculpture, a gambler's choice (a random ship of one of three or four colors on the same horse), and a fresh take on a G1 original model from circa 1975, along with other beautiful models. Six total releases are spread throughout the year.

== BreyerFest ==
BreyerFest was first held in 1990 and since then has been held annually in July at the Kentucky Horse Park in Lexington, Kentucky. This popular event is a three-day festival for model horse collectors of all ages. During this event, attendees can purchase special run Breyer models sold only at Breyerfest, purchase RR (Regular Run) and retired models from Breyer and dealers in attendance, and participate in large model horse shows. In addition, there are classes on how to paint, customize, and repair models as well as lectures on collecting and judging them. Special guests of honor, usually renowned trainers and famous horses, are also present and perform for the attendees. Typically, the equine guest of honor has been previously represented by a Breyer model horse. A live auction is held each year featuring one-of-a-kind model horses created by Breyer and sold to the highest bidder, often for thousands of dollars. A silent auction for rare or customized models and model horse-related accessories is also held. Included in the purchase price of a 3-day ticket is a Traditional-scale "Celebration" model, and 1-day ticket holders receive a Stablemate-scale model. Each BreyerFest has a unique theme, upon which many or all of the special-run models are designed.

== World Equestrian Games ==
In 2010, Breyer produced special models for the FEI World Equestrian Games. This was the first time WEG was held outside of Europe in Lexington, KY. Breyer created the 2010 Games Stablemates Assortment that came with eight miniature horses representing the eight disciplines seen at the games: jumping, eventing, dressage, reining, endurance, driving, vaulting, and para-dressage. In addition, a large Traditional size model, Esprit was sculpted by Kathleen Moody and released specifically for WEG.

== See also ==
- List of fictional horses
