= Sawdust =

Byproduct or waste product of woodworking operations (sawing, sanding, milling, etc.)

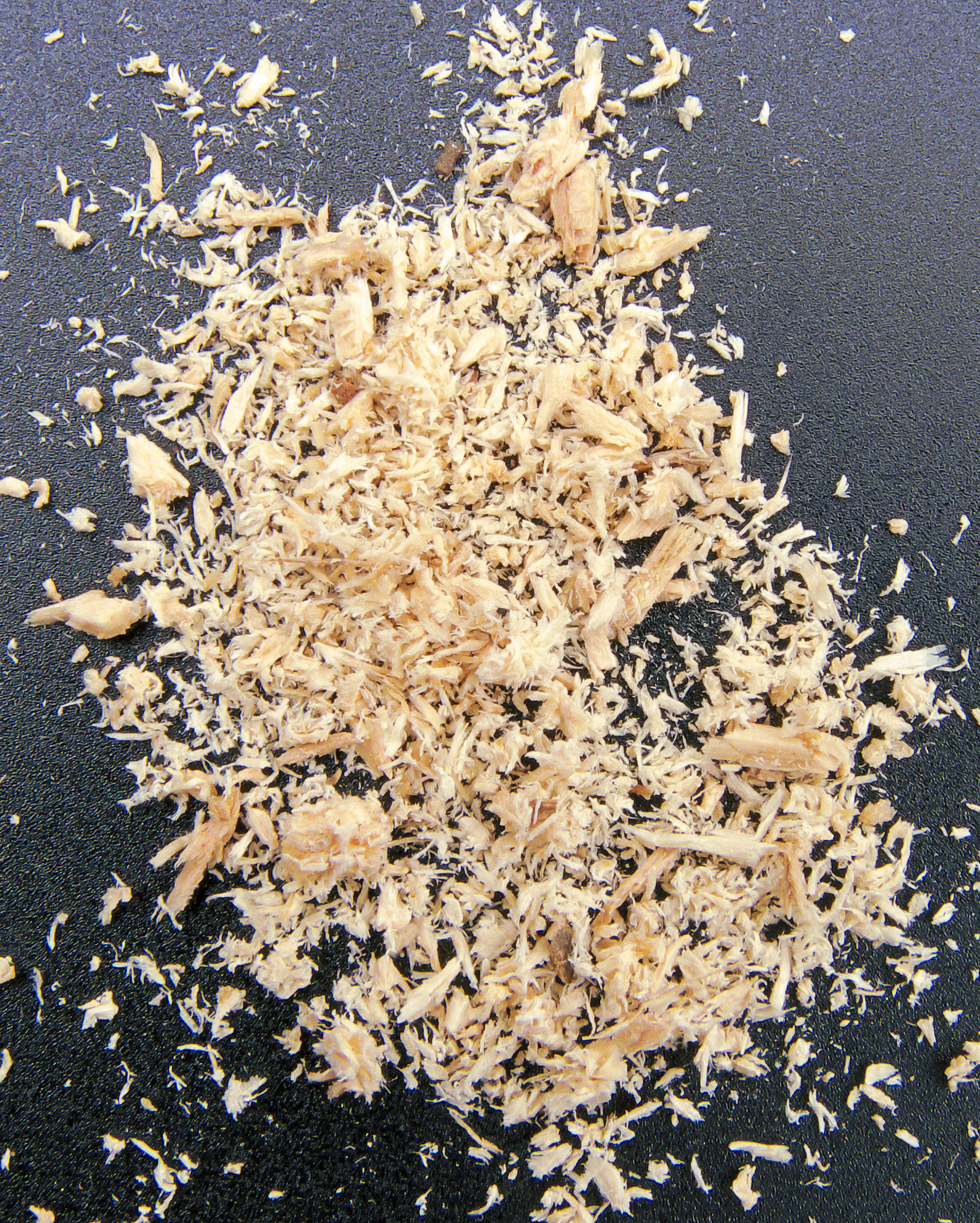
Sawdust made with hand saw

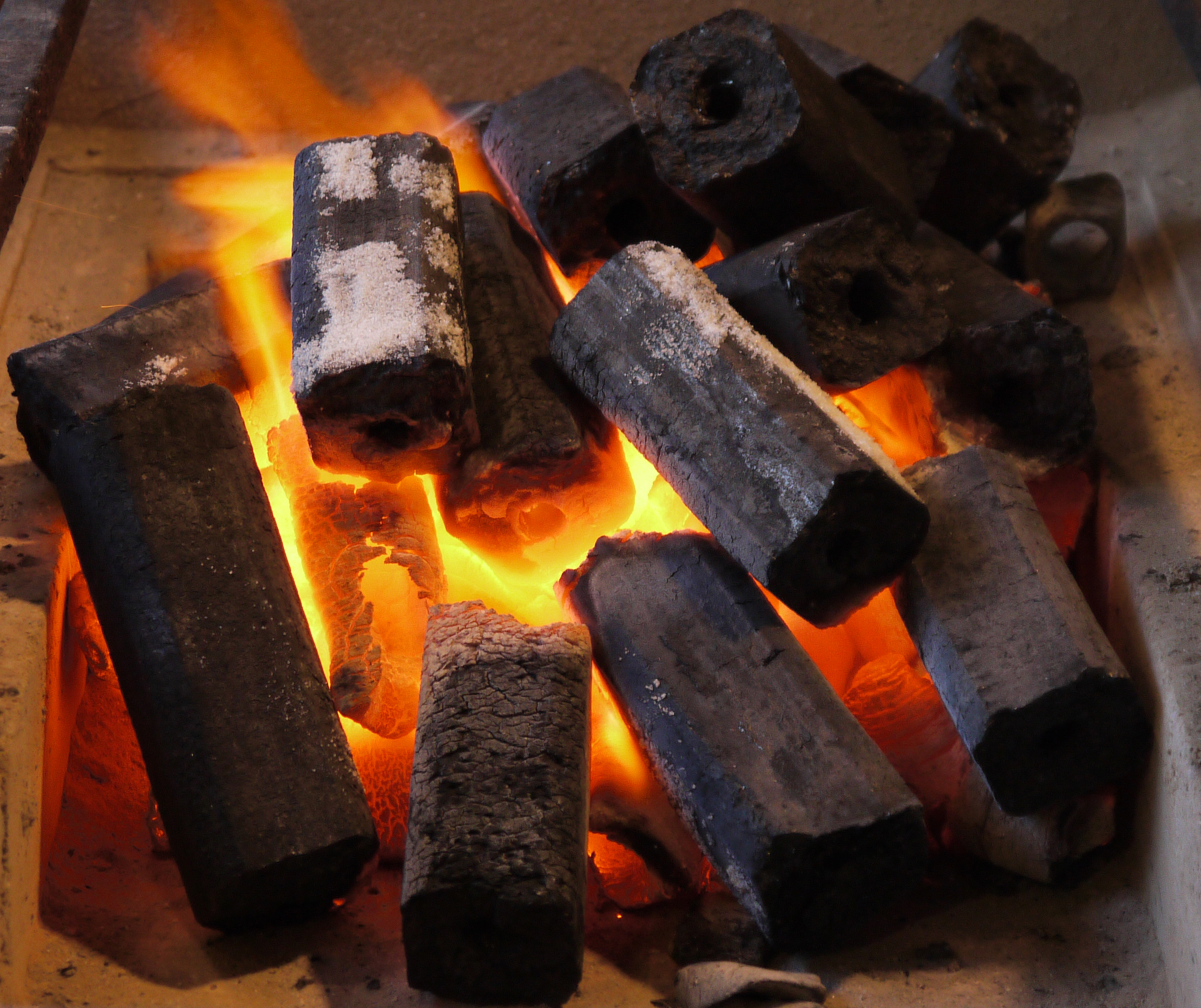
Ogatan, Japanese charcoal briquettes made from sawdust

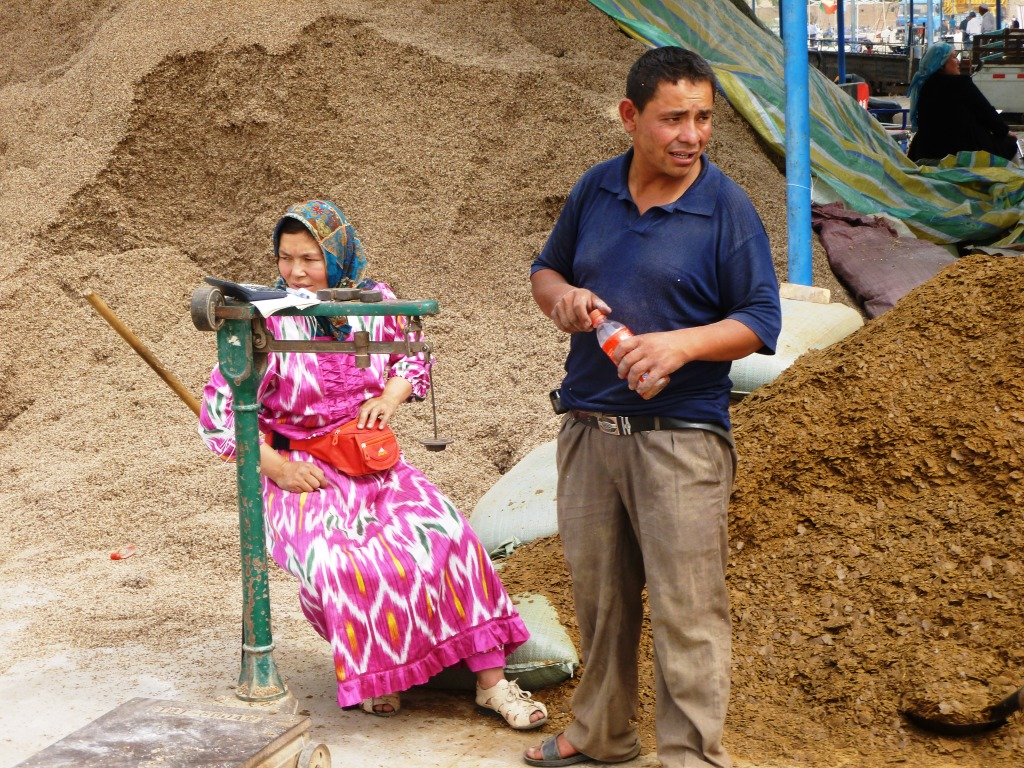
Sawdust vendors in Kashgar markets

Sawdust (or wood dust) is a by-product or waste product of woodworking operations such as sawing, sanding, milling and routing. It is composed of very small chips of wood. These operations can be performed by woodworking machinery, portable power tools or by use of hand tools. In some manufacturing industries it can be a significant fire hazard and source of occupational dust exposure.

Sawdust, as particulates, is the main component of particleboard. Its health hazards is a research subject in the field of occupational safety and health, and study of ventilation happens in indoor air quality engineering. Sawdust is an IARC group 1 Carcinogen. Wood dust can cause cancer. Frequent exposure to wood dust can cause cancers of the nose, throat, and sinuses.

Exposure to wood dust can result in coughing, sneezing, irritation, shortness of breath, dryness and sore throat, rhinitis, conjunctivitis, dermatitis, allergic contact dermatitis, decreased lung capacity, asthma, hypersensitivity pneumonitis, headaches, chills, sweating, nausea, cramps, loss of weight, giddiness and irregular heartbeat.

== Formation ==
Two waste products, dust and chips, form at the working surface during woodworking operations such as sawing, milling and sanding. These operations both shatter lignified wood cells and break out whole cells and groups of cells. Shattering of wood cells creates dust, while breaking out of whole groups of wood cells creates chips. The more cell-shattering that occurs, the finer the dust particles that are produced. For example, sawing and milling are mixed cell shattering and chip forming processes, whereas sanding is almost exclusively cell shattering.

== Uses ==
A major use of sawdust is for particleboard; coarse sawdust may be used for wood pulp. Sawdust has a variety of other practical uses, including serving as a mulch, as an alternative to clay cat litter, or as a fuel. Until the advent of refrigeration, it was often used in icehouses to keep ice frozen during the summer. It has been used in artistic displays, and as scatter in miniature railroad and other models. It is also sometimes used to soak up liquid spills, allowing the spill to be easily collected or swept aside. As such, it was formerly common on barroom floors. It is used to make Cutler's resin. Mixed with water and frozen, it forms pykrete, a slow-melting, much stronger form of ice.

Sawdust is used in the manufacture of charcoal briquettes. The claim for invention of the first commercial charcoal briquettes goes to Henry Ford who created them from the wood scraps and sawdust produced by his automobile factory.

Research has examined also the use of wood shavings as a partial volume replacement for fine aggregates in cement mortar.

=== Food ===
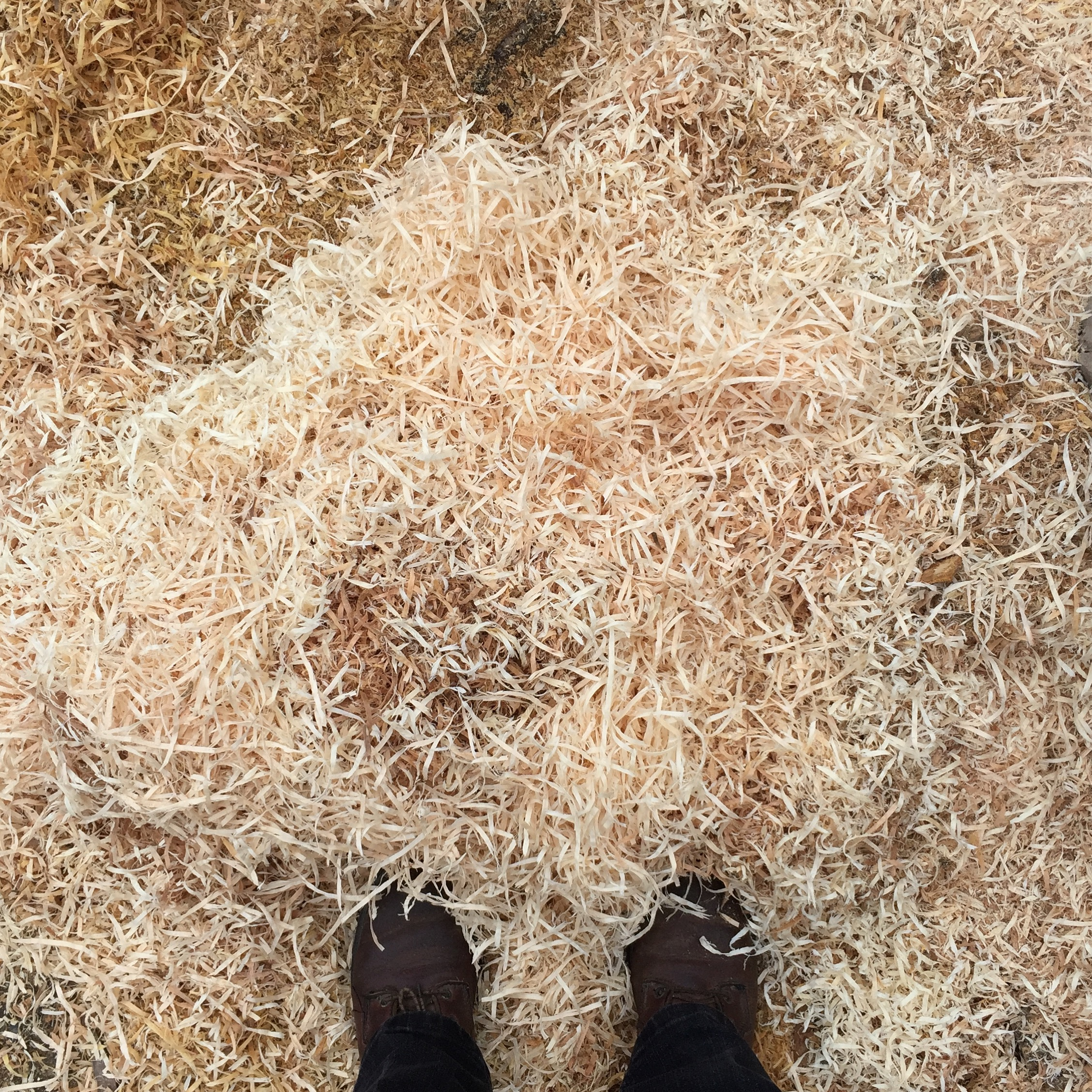
Wood shavings made from a chainsaw in wet wood

Cellulose, fibre starch that is indigestible to humans, and a filler in some low calorie foods, can be and is made from sawdust, as well as from other plant sources. While there is no documentation for the persistent rumor, based upon Upton Sinclair's novel The Jungle, that sawdust was used as a filler in sausage, cellulose derived from sawdust was and is used for sausage casings. Sawdust-derived cellulose has also been used as a filler in bread.

When cereals were scarce, sawdust was sometimes an ingredient in kommissbrot. Auschwitz concentration camp survivor, Dr. Miklós Nyiszli, reports in Auschwitz: A Doctor's Eyewitness Account that the subaltern medical staff, who served Dr. Josef Mengele, subsisted on "bread made from wild chestnuts sprinkled with sawdust".

== Health hazards ==
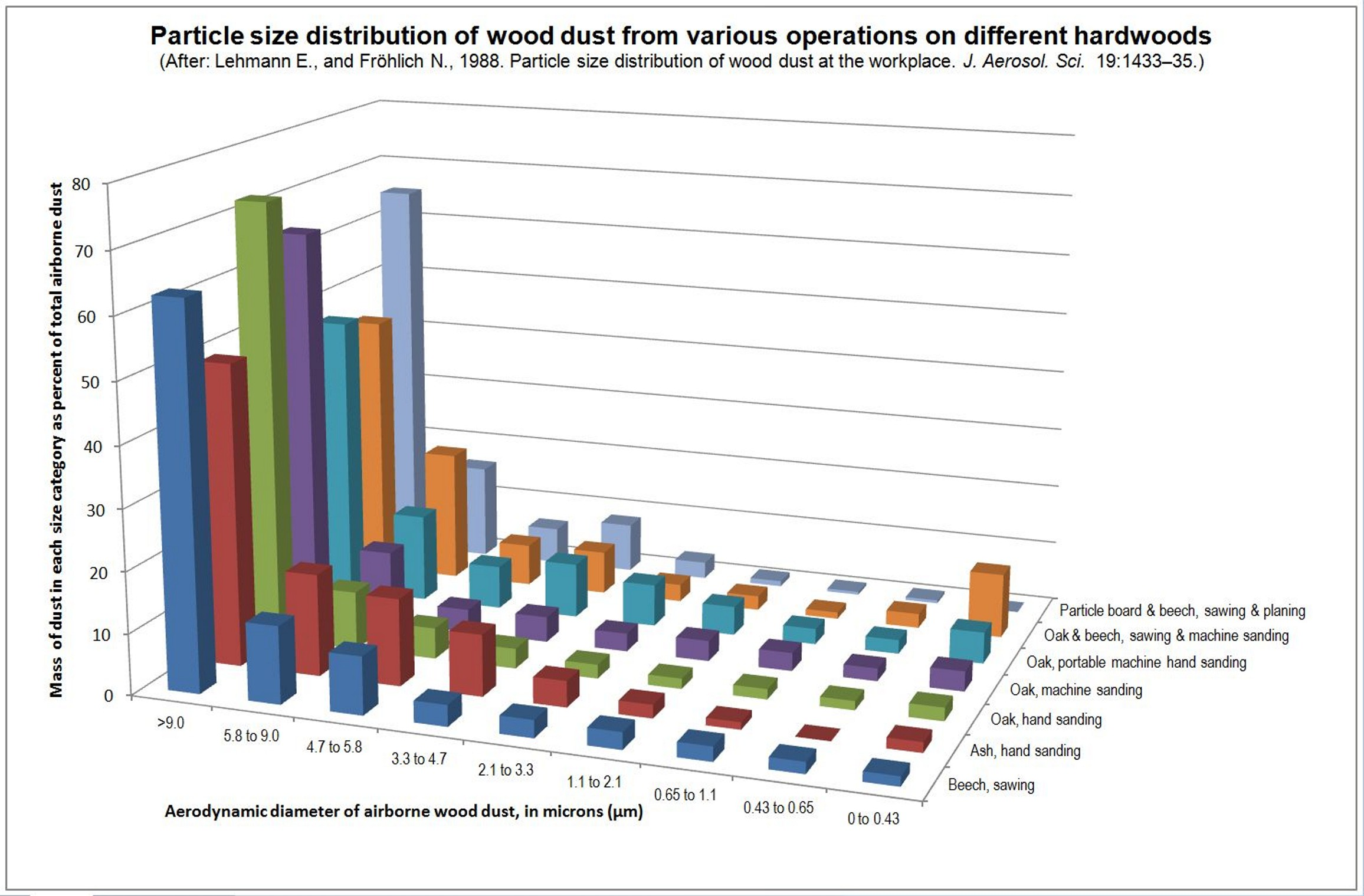
Particle size distribution of hardwood dust (0-9 microns) produced from different processes. Measured by mass only, not numerical measures (PNC)

Airborne sawdust and sawdust accumulations present a number of health and safety hazards. Sanding, routing, shaping and cutting of wood releases wood particles into the air. They become airborne and inhaled. Wood dust can also land on surfaces such as tables and floors and become airborne again when disturbed. Handling of wood chip mulch and compost, especially when dry, can result in wood dust being inhaled, too.

The dust itself causes coughing, sneezing or irritation. Shortness of breath, dryness and sore throat, runny nose (rhinitis), and inflammation of the eye's mucous membranes (conjunctivitis) may also present. Dermatitis with dry, itchy, red, or blister skin is common. It may be due to chemicals' presence in the wood. Allergic contact dermatitis is also possible.

Effects of the respiratory system include "decreased lung capacity, and allergic reactions in the lungs such as hypersensitivity pneumonitis (inflammation of the walls of the air sacs and small airways), and occupational asthma. Hypersensitivity pneumonitis may develop within hours or days following exposure and is often confused with cold or flu symptoms because it begins with headaches, chills, sweating, nausea, breathlessness, etc. Tightness of the chest and breathlessness can be severe" and get worse if exposure continues. The moulds that grow on the wood may also cause some of the hypersensitivity pneumonitis conditions. "Western red cedar is a wood that has a clear association with the development of asthma." Different species of wood have different toxic effects. The chemicals may enter the body through the skin, lungs, or digestive system and may cause breathlessness, headaches, cramps, loss of weight, giddiness and irregular heartbeat.

Many trees species have been associated with health effects, some of them include alder (common, black, red), beech, birch, cedar (western red), douglas fir, fir (grand, balsam, silver, alpine), hemlock, Larch (European), mahogany, maple, oak, pine (white, lodgepole, jack), poplar, rosewood, spruce, teak, walnut (black) and yew.

Other products used in or on wood may also have hazards, some examples include pesticides, resins, paint, paint strippers, adhesives, glues, waterproofing compounds, lacquers, varnishes, sealants and dyes.

Wood dust is a known human carcinogen. It can cause cancers of the nose, throat, and sinuses. Certain woods and their dust contain toxins that can produce severe allergic reactions. The composition of sawdust depends on the material it comes from (e.g., natural wood, processed wood or wood veneer).

Breathing airborne wood dust may cause allergic respiratory symptoms, mucosal and non-allergic respiratory symptoms, and cancer. In the US, lists of carcinogenic factors are published by the American Conference of Governmental Industrial Hygienists (ACGIH), the Occupational Safety and Health Administration (OSHA), and the National Institute for Occupational Safety and Health (NIOSH). All these organisations recognize wood dust as carcinogenic in relation to the nasal cavities and paranasal sinuses.

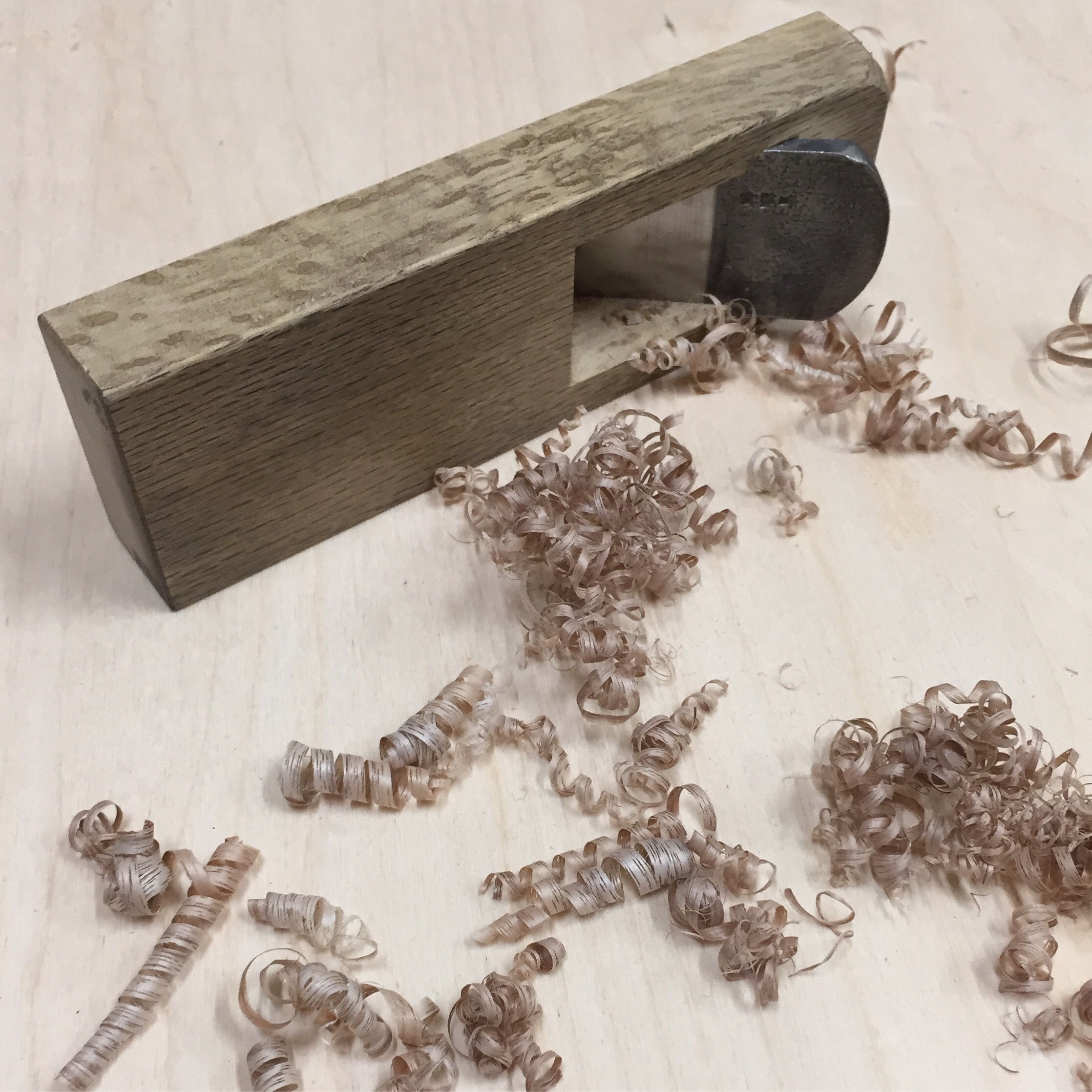
Wood shavings made with a Japanese handplane

People can be exposed to wood dust in the workplace by breathing it in, skin contact, or eye contact. The OSHA has set the legal limit (permissible exposure limit) for wood dust exposure in the workplace as 15 mg/m^{3} total exposure and 5 mg/m^{3} respiratory exposure over an 8-hour workday. The NIOSH has set a recommended exposure limit (REL) of 1 mg/m^{3} over an 8-hour workday.

To reduce exposure, indoor dust-collection or air-filtration system can be installed. A sanding table or saw hood that draws particles downward can also be used. Blowers, fans, brooms, or compressed air should not be used to move the dust. Vacuum with a HEPA filter, use wet cloths for clean-up, seal and dispose wood dust with care from vacuum or other dust extraction systems, and "Change out of clothes that contain wood dust before entering your home, car, or other areas" are also important for reducing exposure.

Water-borne bacteria digest organic material in leachate, but use up much of the available oxygen. This high biochemical oxygen demand can suffocate fish and other organisms. There is an equally detrimental effect on beneficial bacteria, so it is not at all advisable to use sawdust within home aquariums, as was once done by hobbyists seeking to save some expense on activated carbon.

=== Explosions and fire ===
Sawdust is flammable and accumulations provide a ready source of fuel. Airborne sawdust can be ignited by sparks or even heat accumulation and result in dust fire or explosions.

=== Environmental effects ===
At sawmills, unless reprocessed into particleboard, burned in a sawdust burner, or used to make heat for other milling operations, sawdust may collect in piles and add harmful leachates into local water systems, creating an environmental hazard. This has placed small sawyers and environmental agencies in a deadlock.

Questions about the science behind the determination of sawdust being an environmental hazard remain for sawmill operators (though this is mainly with finer particles), who compare wood residuals to dead trees in a forest. Technical advisors have reviewed some of the environmental studies, but say most lack standardized methodology or evidence of a direct impact on wildlife. They do not take into account large drainage areas, so the amount of material that is getting into the water from the site in relation to the total drainage area is minuscule.

Other scientists have a different view, saying the "dilution is the solution to pollution" argument is no longer accepted in environmental science. The decomposition of a tree in a forest is similar to the impact of sawdust, but the difference is of scale. Sawmills may be storing thousands of cubic metres of wood residues in one place, so the issue becomes one of concentration.

Of larger concern are substances such as lignins and fatty acids that protect trees from predators while they are alive, but can leach into water and poison wildlife. Those types of things remain in the tree and, as the tree decays, they slowly are broken down. But when sawyers are processing a large volume of wood and large concentrations of these materials permeate into the runoff, the toxicity they cause is harmful to a broad range of organisms.

== Wood flour ==
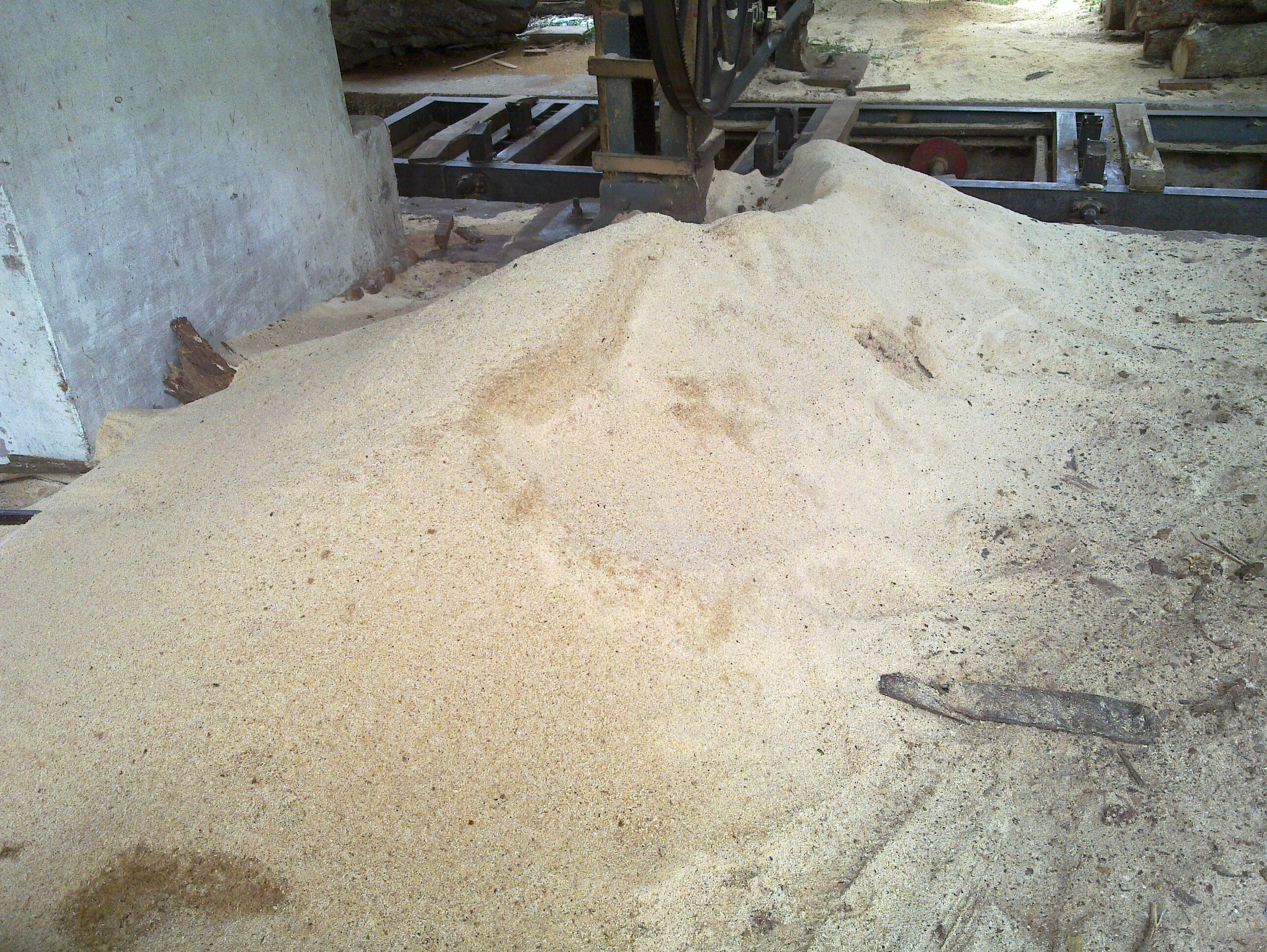
Wood powder as a waste product

Wood flour is finely pulverized wood that has a consistency fairly equal to sand or sawdust, but can vary considerably, with particles ranging in dimensions from a fine powder to roughly that of a grain of rice. Most wood flour manufacturers are able to create batches of wood flour that have the same consistency throughout. All high quality wood flour is made from hardwoods because of its durability and strength. Very low grade wood flour is occasionally made from sapless softwoods such as pine or fir.

=== Applications ===
Wood flour is commonly used as a filler in thermosetting resins such as bakelite, and in linoleum floor coverings. Wood flour is also the main ingredient in wood/plastic composite building products such as decks and roofs. Prior to 1920, wood flour was used as the filler in ¼-inch thick Edison Diamond Discs.

Wood flour has found a use in plugging small through-wall holes in leaking main condenser (heat exchanger) tubes at electrical power generating stations via injecting small quantities of the wood flour into the cooling water supply lines. Some of the injected wood flour clogs the small holes while the remainder exits the station in a relatively environmentally benign fashion.

Because of its adsorbent properties it has been used as a cleaning agent for removing grease or oil in various occupations. It has also been noted for its ability to remove lead contamination from water.

Wood flour can be used as a binder in grain filler compounds.

=== Sources ===
Large quantities of wood flour are frequently to be found in the waste from woodworking and furniture companies. An adaptive reuse to which this material can be directed is composting.

Wood flour can be subject to dust explosions if not cared for and disposed of properly.

=== Respirable particulates ===
As with all airborne particulates, wood dust particle sizes are classified with regard to effect on the human respiratory system. For this classification, the unit for measurement of particle sizes is the micrometre or micron (μm), where 1 micrometre = 1 micron. Particles below 50 μm are not normally visible to the naked human eye. Particles of concern for human respiratory health are those <100 μm (where the symbol < means 'less than').

Zhang (2004) has defined the size of indoor particulates according to respiratory fraction:

Respiratory fraction	Size range
Inhalable	≤ 100 μm
Thoracic	≤ 10 μm
Respirable	≤ 4 μm
Diminutive	≤ 0.5 μm

Particles which precipitate in the vicinity of the mouth and eyes, and get into the organism, are defined as the inhalable fraction, that is total dust. Smaller fractions, penetrating into the non-cartilage respiratory tract, are defined as respirable dust. Dust emitted in the wood industry is characterized by the dimensional disintegration of particles up to 5 μm, and that is why they precipitate mostly in the nasal cavity, increasing the risk of cancer of the upper respiratory tract.

=== Exposure ===
The parameter most commonly used to characterize exposures to wood dust in air is total wood dust concentration, in mass per unit volume. In countries that use the metric system, this is usually measured in mg/m^{3} (milligram per cubic metre)

A study to estimate occupational exposure to inhalable wood dust by country, industry, the level of exposure and type of wood dust in 25 member states of the European Union (EU-25) found that in 2000–2003, about 3.6 million workers (2.0% of the employed EU-25 population) were occupationally exposed to inhalable wood dust. The highest exposure levels were estimated to occur in the construction sector and furniture industry.

=== Cancer ===
Wood dust is known to be a human carcinogen, based on sufficient evidence of carcinogenicity from studies in humans. It has been demonstrated through human epidemiologic studies that exposure to wood dust increases the occurrence of cancer of the nose (nasal cavities and paranasal sinuses). An association of wood dust exposure and cancers of the nose has been observed in numerous case reports, cohort studies, and case control studies specifically addressing nasal cancer.

== Ventilation ==
To lower the concentration of airborne dust concentrations during woodworking, dust extraction systems are used. These can be divided into two types. The first are local exhaust ventilation systems, the second are room ventilation systems. Personal respirators, a form of personal protective equipment, can also protect workers from dust. The UK Health and Safety Executive considers respiratory protective equipment the least effective control measure, because it protects only the person wearing it, whereas local exhaust ventilation helps protect everyone in the workplace.

=== Local exhaust ===
Local exhaust ventilation (LEV) systems rely on air pulled with a suction force through piping systems from the point of dust formation to a waste disposal unit. They consist of four elements: dust hoods at the point of dust formation, ventilation ducts, an air cleaning device (waste separator or dust collector) and an air moving device (a fan, otherwise known as an impeller). The air, containing dust and chips from the woodworking operation, is sucked by an impeller. The impeller is usually built into, or placed close to, the waste disposal unit, or dust collector.

Guidelines of performance for woodworking LEV systems exist, and these tie into occupational air quality regulations that exist in many countries. The LEV guidelines often referred to are those set by the ACIAH.

==== Low volume/high velocity ====
Low-volume/high-velocity (LVHV) capture systems are specialised types of LEV that use an extractor hood designed as an integral part of the tool or positioned very close to the operating point of the cutting tool. The hood is designed to provide high capture velocities, often greater than 50 m/s (10,000 fpm) at the contaminant release point. This high velocity is accompanied by airflows often less than 0.02m3/s (50 cfm) resulting from the small face area of the hood that is used. These systems have come into favour for portable power tools, although adoption of the technology is not widespread. Festool is one manufacturer of portable power tools using LVHV ventilation integrated into the tool design.

=== Room ===
If suitably designed, general ventilation can also be used as a control of airborne dust. General ventilation can often help reduce skin and clothing contamination, and dust deposition on surfaces.

== History ==
According to the report published in 2008, There was once a time when sawmill operators considered sawdust to be a useless by-product of wood cutting process. Since it had little or no commercial value, they often disposed it by dumping it in the forest or burning it just to get rid of the stuff. However as industries began recognizing the potential use of this material, the situation changed dramatically. Today sawdust become a valuable resource. These days, they have ready markets for sawdust…". For example, sawdust is used by biomass power plants as fuel or is sold to dairy farmers as animal bedding.

== See also ==
- Arsenic – was used as wood preservative
- Dust collection system
- Formaldehyde – used as adhesive
- Pesticides – used as preservative to replace arsenic and chromium
- Swarf
- Wood glue
- Wood preservation
