= Hagen-Renaker =

California pottery company

Hagen-Renaker, Inc.
- Industry: Ceramic manufacturing
- Founded: 1946
- Founder: John and Maxine Renaker, Sr.
- Defunct: 2021
- Fate: Inactive
- Headquarters: San Dimas, California, United States
- Products: Ceramic art ware and figurines

Hagen-Renaker was a California pottery company established in Southern California in 1946. The company was founded and owned by John Renaker, Sr., and Maxine Renaker, The company's early production were plates, butter pats, and bowls made in their garage in Culver City, California. The company realized the potential for figurines, and began making them exclusively. Notable designers Tom Masterson, Neil Bortells, Martha Armstrong-Hand, Don Winton, and Will Climes designed for Hagen-Renaker. Hagen-Renaker is known for their miniature figurines and horse figurines.

== History ==
With the help of Maxine's father Ole Hagen, John and Maxine Renaker built their first, small factory in Monrovia, California in 1946. The hyphenated name of the company was a way to thank and pay tribute to Ole Hagen. Maxine made a little duck to show a Brownie troop touring the factory how pottery was made. The duck was fired in the kiln between the larger items, and was an immediate success. John realized the potential for animal figurines, and began making them exclusively.

Decorator Helen Perrin Farnlund was hired early in the history of the company, and became known as the designer who created the majority of the "cute" animal and human models. Maureen Love was hired originally as a decorator, but quickly established herself as a designer of realistic animals. Most of the horses, and much of the realistic wildlife, farm, and domestic animals were created by Maureen.

Tom Masterson was a designer for Hagen-Renaker in the early 1950s, and is known for the realistic Pedigree Dog line, plus some other large animals. Other designers included Nell Bortells, who designed many of the Disney pieces and the Little Horribles line of caricature critters and Martha Armstrong-Hand, who also designed some Disney pieces, cats, and some human models. Don Winton and Will Climes, who had their own California pottery companies, designed figurines for Hagen-Renaker. Winton designed many of the Hagen-Renaker Disney pieces.

The company moved around southern California following the ebb and flow of the economy. During the early years of the post-World War II economic expansion, from the late 1940s to the mid-1950s, the factory expanded to several buildings in Monrovia. Later, as the competition from Japanese ceramics started to cut into the domestic business, Hagen-Renaker collapsed back down to one building in Monrovia. In the early 1960s, they moved the factory to San Dimas, California where John Renaker also had a plant nursery.

During a brief attempt at expansion, Hagen-Renaker purchased the Freeman-McFarlin factory in San Marcos, California and produced the Designers Workshop line there from 1980 to 1986. They then closed that facility and regrouped all resources in San Dimas. This is important because when collectors refer to pieces made by Hagen-Renaker, one way they are identified is by the factory where they were produced. Each factory has its own style and features.

There are roughly three sizes of pottery animals. The Designers Workshop line consists of animals in approximately the 5″ to 12″ range. The horses by Maureen Love are the most desirable and highly collectible items from this line. There are also farm animals, wild animals, and domestic animals in this size range. They were produced from the early 1950s through the mid-1980s, and the horses are currently (late 2000s) being released again. The miniature line was the first line made when Maxine produced the little duck, and the miniatures remain popular today. A relatively new line, Specialty size, was started in the 1990s and continues today. It can be described as being between the size of the miniatures and the Designer Workshop pieces.

John and Maxine Renaker retired from the pottery business in 1996, and their oldest daughter Susan Renaker Nikas took over running the company. Maxine Hagen Renaker died in July 2003. She wrote a memoir of her childhood in Red Lodge, Montana and Williston, North Dakota entitled One Lucky Kid. The book was originally published in 1993 and reissued in 2008. John Renaker died in November 2014. He had published two books unrelated to the ceramics business: Dr. Strangelove and the Hideous Epoch: Deterrence in the Nuclear Age was published in 2000. A collection of essays related to his lifelong interest in science was published in 2005 and entitled Once More into the Deja Vu.

At the end of 2021, the official Hagen-Renaker website was updated to state that no new ceramics would be produced in San Dimas, as Nikas was very ill. The remaining inventory was sold to a third party for purchase by dealers and collectors. The tradition of made in America figurines continues with Hagen-Renaker Tennessee.
