= Ian Sprague =

Australian potter (1920–1994)

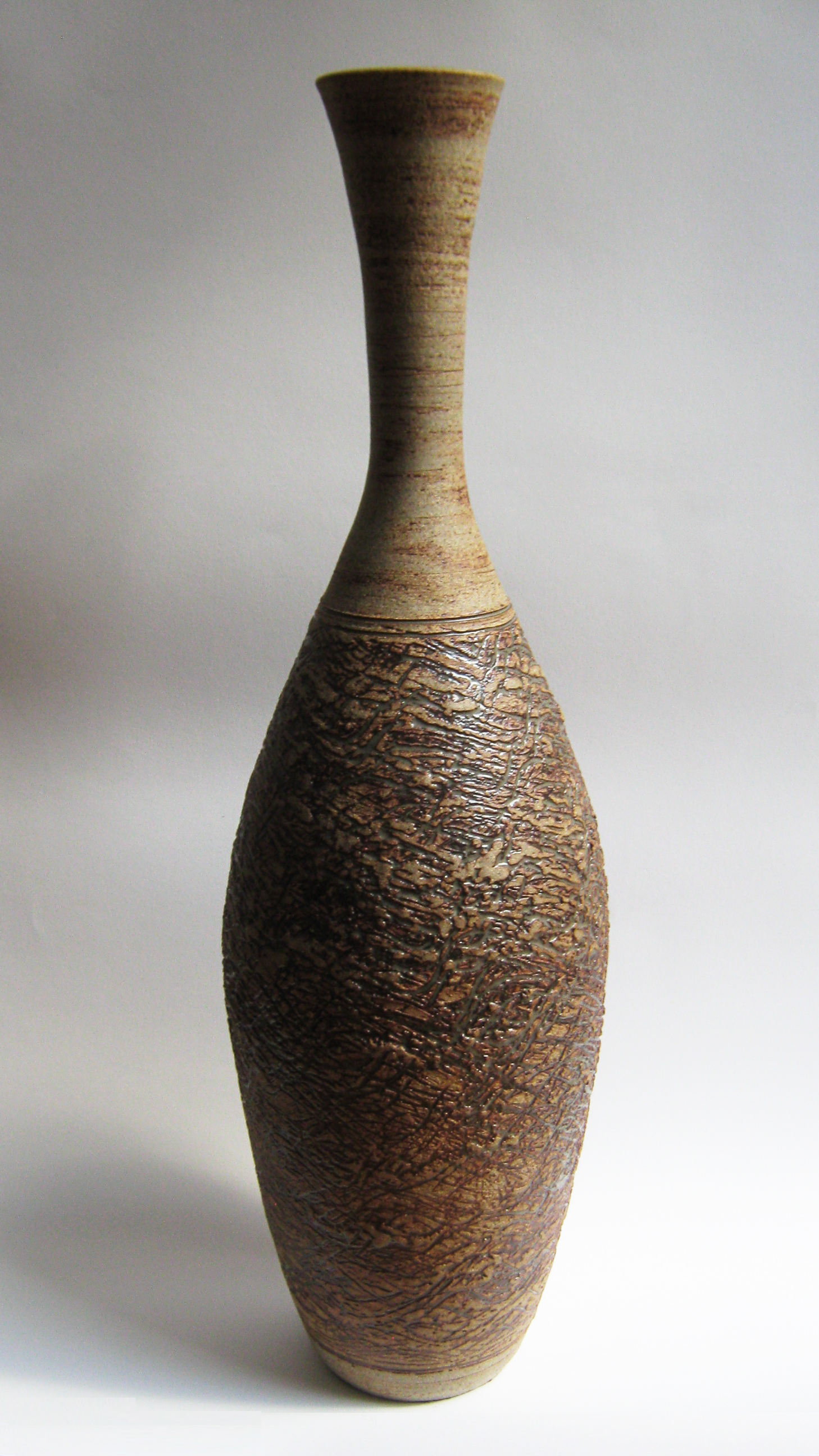
Tall stoneware vase with textured neck and cross-scored body, 1970s; 21cm x 64cm; Ian Sprague and Mungeribar marks.

Ian Broun Sprague (1920–1994) was an Australian twentieth-century studio potter, ceramic sculptor and graphic artist. Delayed by the Second World War and a false start in architecture, he spent (broadly) his forties adapting Australian domestic pottery to a Japanese aesthetic of contemplative use; his fifties as a sculptor in two- and three-dimensional pottery; his sixties and seventies making landscape works on paper.

== Early life ==
Sprague was born in Geelong, Victoria, Australia, in 1920. He was the sixth and last child of Leslie Sprague, a wealthy grazier and Marion Broun, Armidale-born descendant of the Scottish Broun baronets. He was educated at Geelong Grammar. Trained as an architectural draughtsman, Sprague spent the Second World War in the AIF in New Guinea as a signals officer. After the war he went to the University of Melbourne and completed an architecture degree in 1950. But he found the next ten years in architects' offices in Melbourne and London tedious and unsatisfying. Sprague was 6 ft. 1 in. tall with fair hair and blue eyes. He appeared at Government House parties and as best man at fashionable weddings, but was homosexual, and never married. On a driving holiday in Scotland in 1957, he had a car accident that put him in hospital for five months. One knee was permanently damaged and a frequent source of pain. His surgeon suggested he restore the strength of his arms by taking up a craft.

== Pottery ==
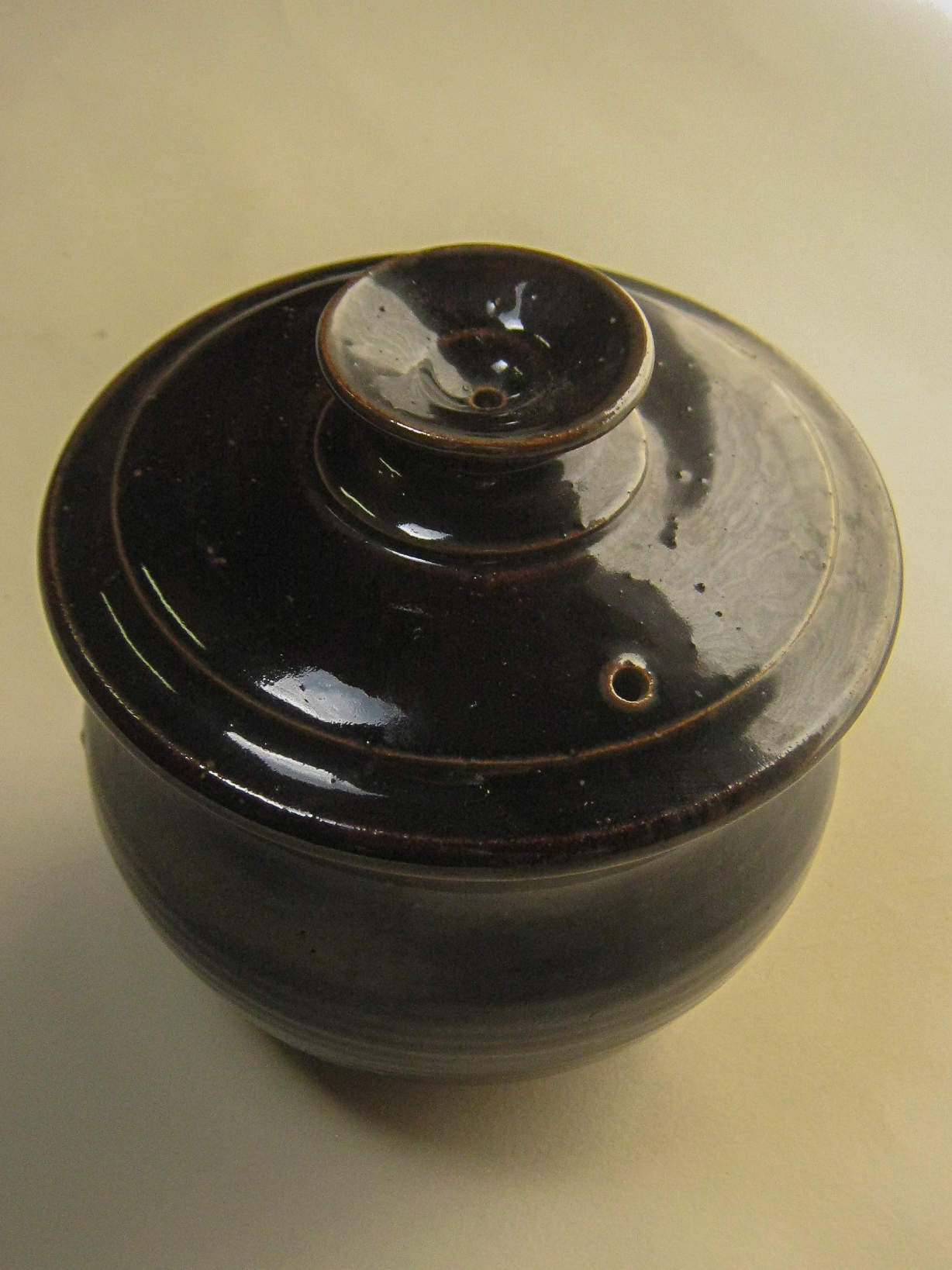
Lidded storage jar, Tenmoku glazed; 14cm x 15cm; Ian Sprague mark.

Sprague attended the London Central School of Arts and Crafts from 1958 to 1960. He spent two months at the David Leach pottery in Devon. He returned to Australia in February 1962, planning to make ethical pots in the Anglo–Japanese tradition founded by Bernard Leach, David's father. Sprague bought a 15-acre estate in Upper Beaconsfield, Victoria.

I had this whole setup clearly in mind. I wanted to live out of Melbourne. I wanted to have animals, some land, and to be completely free to do what I wanted.

On the estate he set up a pottery, designed and built a new house nearby and renovated an existing five-room cottage. From England he had imported a Homer kiln capable of the high temperatures needed to make stoneware and porcelain rather than earthenware, and a Boulton's cone-driven wheel and pugmill. The equipment was on a commercial scale but devoted to studio work. The pottery was called Mungeribar: "red clay" in the local Aboriginal (Woiwurrung) language.

… we finally arrived at a stoneware body mixing a local fireclay with commercial red clay, china clay and ball clay … it works well and reduces to a red-brown with lighter speckling … Most of the glazes we use are, as a result, in the darker earthy colours but speckled light greys and ochres are also possible.

The Mungeribar Pottery's mark is a Macdonald's em impressed; Sprague's personal mark is a capital I over a horizontal separator and the Morse code for S—three dots. Some pots are signed "IanS". Drawings and paintings are signed "Ian Sprague"; work signed simply "Sprague" is generally by his nephew Leslie.

Sprague had met and liked the potter and Slade School technician Robin Welch (b. 1936) in England. He paid for Welch and his family to come to Mungeribar in 1962 so Welch could help him set up a fully professional pottery. The Welches returned to England in 1965. In the October 1965 issue of Pottery in Australia, Sprague described their successes and failures in setting up the pottery. The description and plans are so detailed as to amount to a specification for would-be imitators. Sprague produced a full range of functional domestic pottery from 1964 to 1980.

In 1964 he established the Craft Centre in South Yarra, "a display centre and exhibition gallery for Australia's highest standard craft work". Sprague thus had control of every step of production from mixing the clay to passing wrapped pots over the counter. The Centre was owned and stocked entirely by him, and he travelled all over Australia in search of the best pottery, textiles, glassware, woodwork and jewellery. The opening exhibition showed the pottery of Robin Welch. Sprague sold the Centre in 1967, but soon started a campaign for a government funded centre, eventually established as the Meat Market Craft Centre in North Melbourne. In 1971 Sprague became president of the recently established Craft Association of Victoria. Dismayed by the quality of teaching in art schools and technical colleges, he ran many workshops around the country on the textural treatment of clay.

I feel that one should contribute something for the common good, although often a tremendous amount of one's creative work-time is used … Establishing and running a property, collecting paintings by Australian artists, pop and classical records and continually entertaining friends and visitors has not left me enough time for my own work.

=== Functional pottery ===
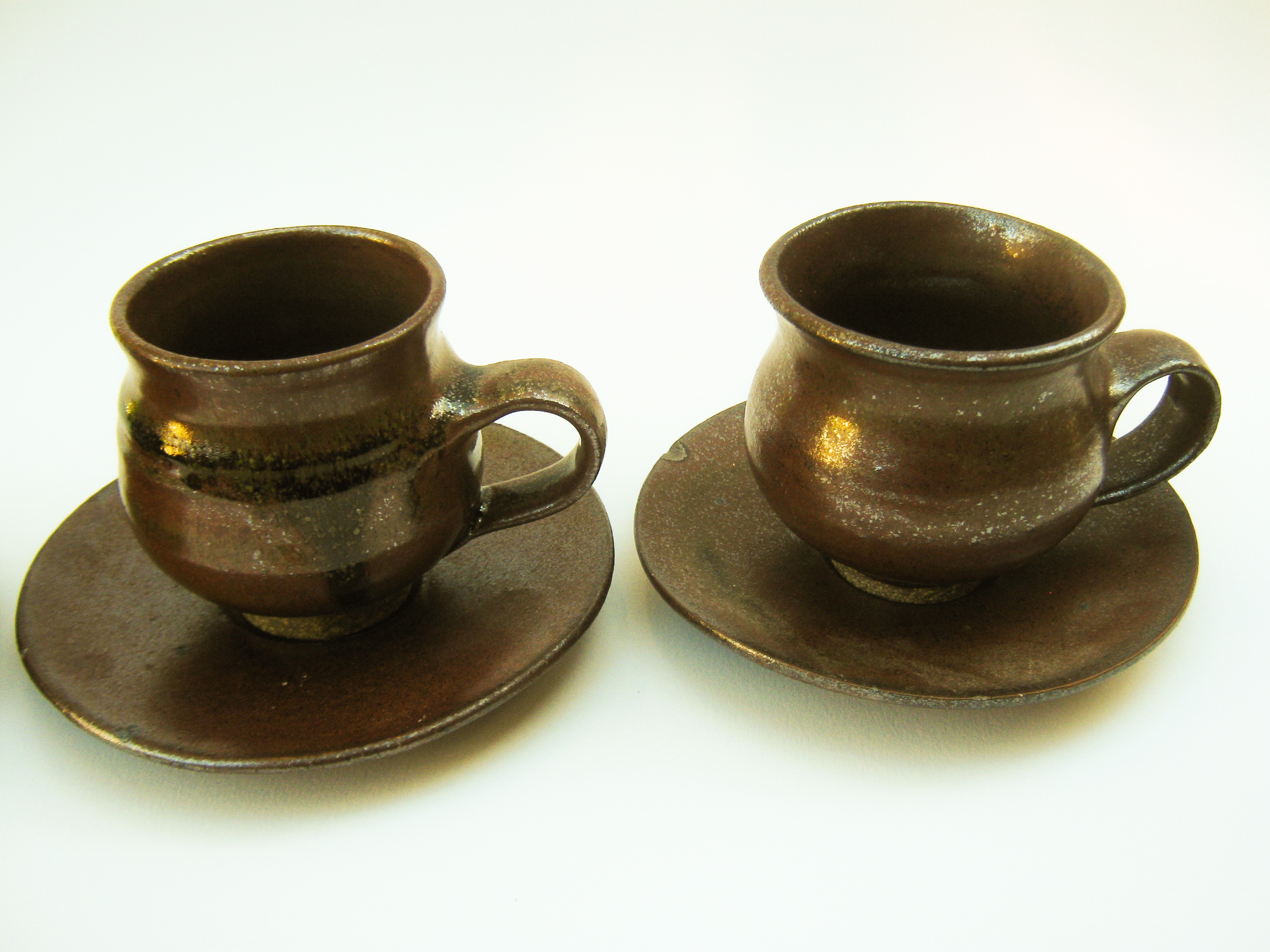
Iron-glazed stoneware cups and saucers from a set of six, 1960s; cups 105mm x 70mm, saucers 120mm x 20mm; Ian Sprague and Mungeribar marks.

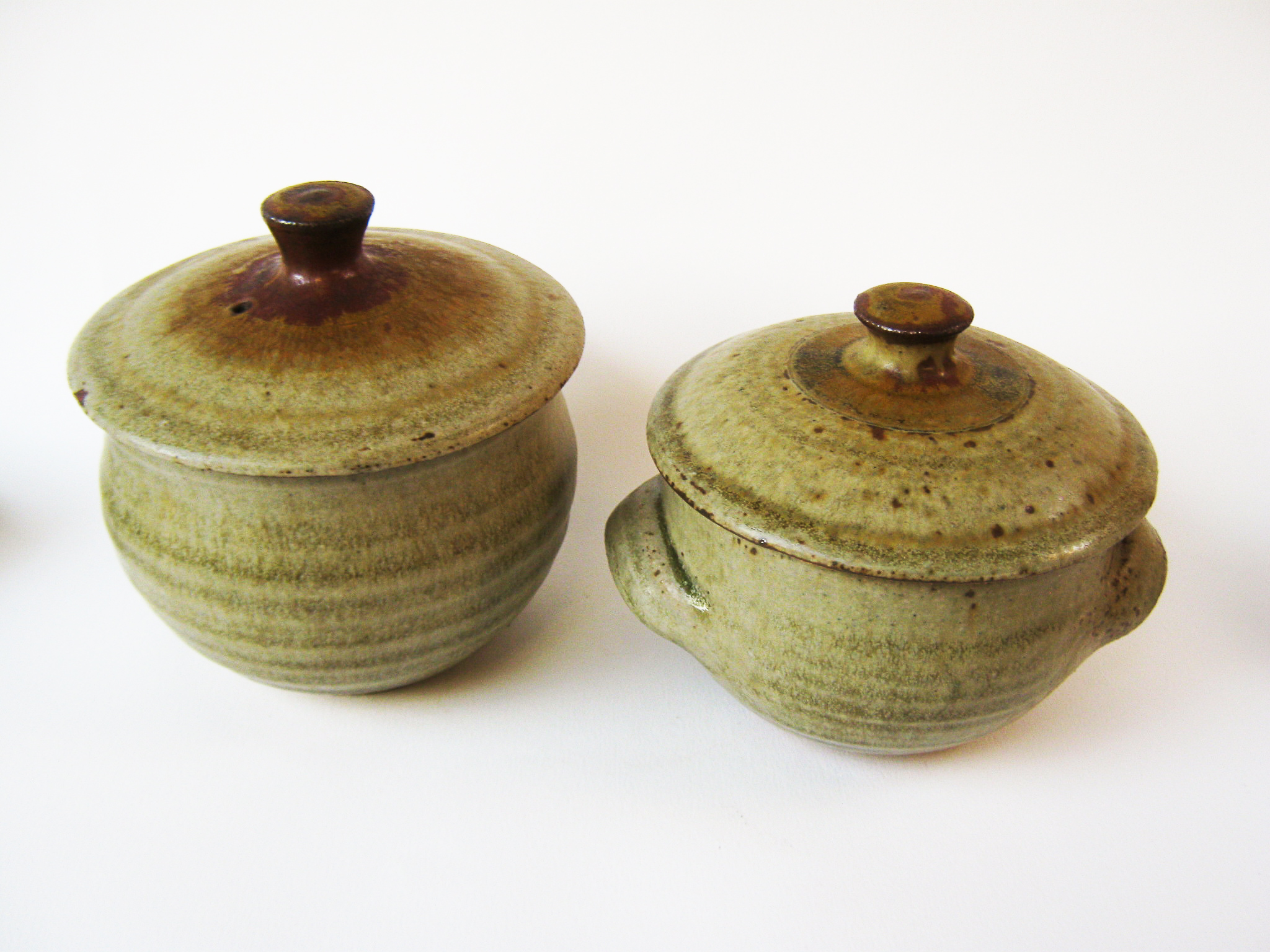
Two ash-glazed storage jars, one with lugs, mid-1970s; 15cm x 10cm (with lugs), 13cm x 11cm (without); both with Ian Sprague mark.

On one view, Sprague never produced great quantities of work himself; he was a self-effacing craftsman, not inclined to promote or exhibit his work. Yet he fired about 1,500 domestic pots of his own each year and scores of them are now in public collections.

The brown stonewares, the nicely formed functional breadcrocks, teapots, fruit platters and teacups and saucers … made his a household name among the 1970s cognoscenti.

Victor Greenaway was his apprentice 1969–73. (Greenaway's mark in his Mungeribar years was an impressed capital G.) Greenaway eventually became Sprague's friend and occasional manager. He considered Sprague

a gentleman potter … exceptionally skilled at his craft … For Welch, the greatest pleasure was to see shelves full of multiples of his own work but for Sprague, his objective was to place the hand-made piece of pottery in the house — making cups and saucers and beautiful objects to use and feel and generally appreciate.

In 1973 Sprague excised two acres of Mungeribar to provide Greenaway with land for a house of his own. The other apprentices at Mungeribar were Grattan Burley (for six months), Christopher Sanders (1976–78), who became a lifelong friend, and Trevor Hanby (1978–80). After 14 years of hands-on pottery making, Sprague ceded to Hanby the job of developing a full range of pots to be sold under the Mungeribar mark.

In 1965 the famous Japanese potter Shōji Hamada had made a range of pots at Mungeribar; they are now in the Hamilton Gallery. The Japanese potter Tatsuzo Shimaoka worked at Mungeribar in 1972. Throughout the 1970s such international masters as Harry Davis, Ian Auld, Fujiwara Yu and Michael Cardew visited.

=== Non-functional pottery ===
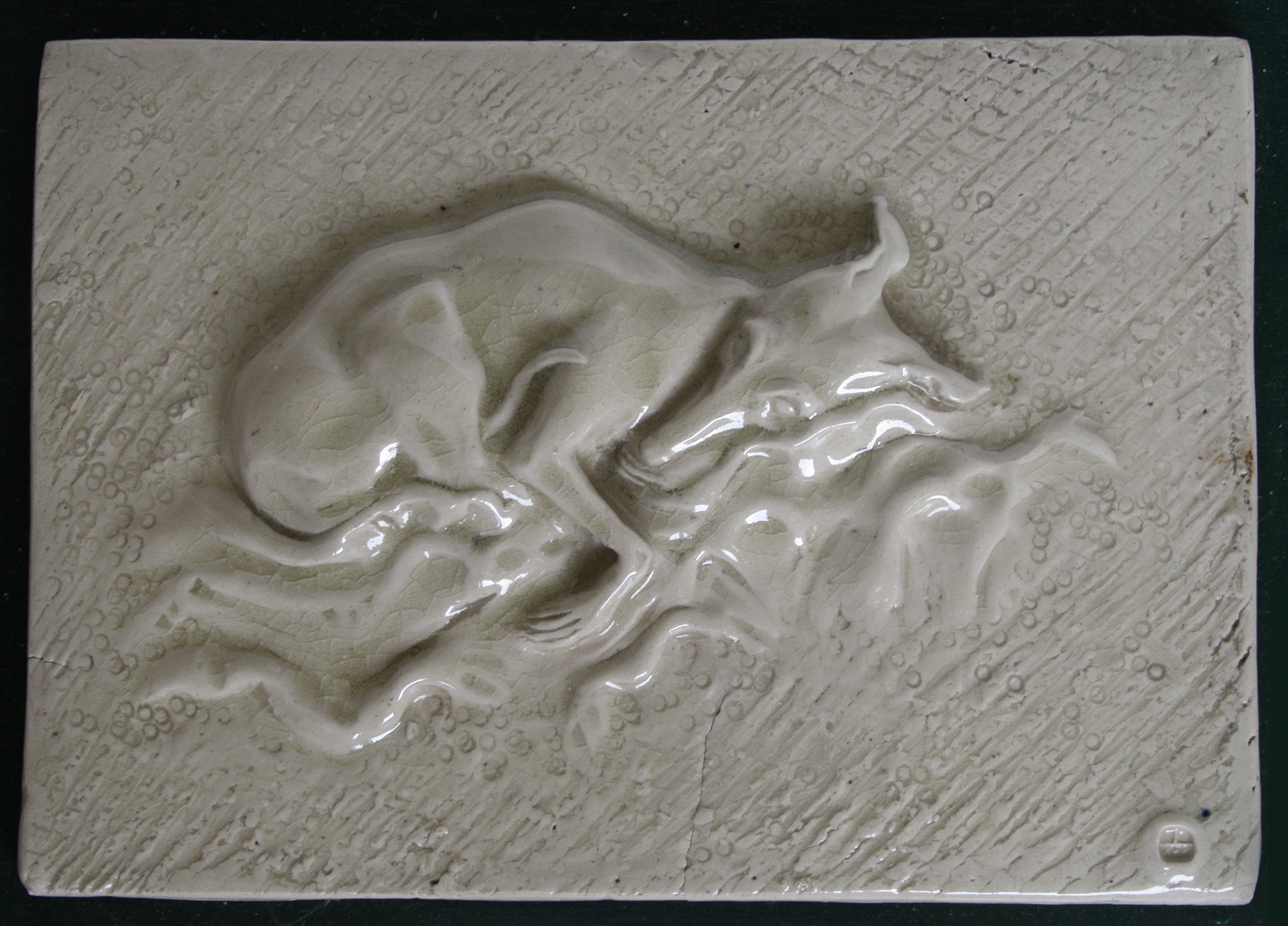
Celadon-glazed pottery bas-relief of his dog Sprint 1979; Ian Sprague mark.

In the mid-1970s Sprague, following Robin Welch, produced a series of sculptures by adding anthropomorphic features to spindly thrown pots. Bearing such names as Critic, Totem and Warrior, they look like excavated chthonic mannikins.

Ovoid forms originated on the wheel but were beaten and scraped into expressive asymmetry and ornamented with clay disks and straps. A large group of these was shown at Leveson Street Gallery, North Melbourne, in December 1980.

From 1973 at the latest he specialised in fireclay panels for architectural use as wall plaques or free-standing sculptures (Littlemore's Nine Artist Potters first edition of 1973 has photos of six of them). Later examples have a spine of coloured glass in clay wells.

Sprague produced his wall panels by cutting them from fireclay blocks, heating and scraping them, and applying bold simplified motifs. These rugged clay surfaces were often finished simply by pouring a strong solution of salted water on to their surfaces … [firing] resulting in a warm toasted surface effect.
The hand-modelled clay panels … combine expressive abstract forms and a rare understanding of the modulation of two dimensional relief sculpture.

Generally the panels were in groups of three, but installations of 8 panels (two by four), 42 (seven by six) or 27 (three by nine) were made, notably for the Modernist Beaumaris house of sculptor and portrait painter Shirley Hannan. Hannan was one of many clients who became admiring friends.

Single panels were sometimes glazed bas-relief sculptures.

Sprague laid out a design of 20,000 ceramic tiles in the Fitzroy Gardens, Melbourne, in 1979 to form a "people's pathway". Four years later he contributed a "cave seat" to another community art-work, the Terracotta Mural Garden at Benalla, Victoria.

Sprague held open house on Sundays at Mungeribar for friends, and their friends, and his hospitality over decades played an important part in the lives of middle and upper-class gay Melbourne at a time when homosexuality still constituted a crime.

== Later life ==
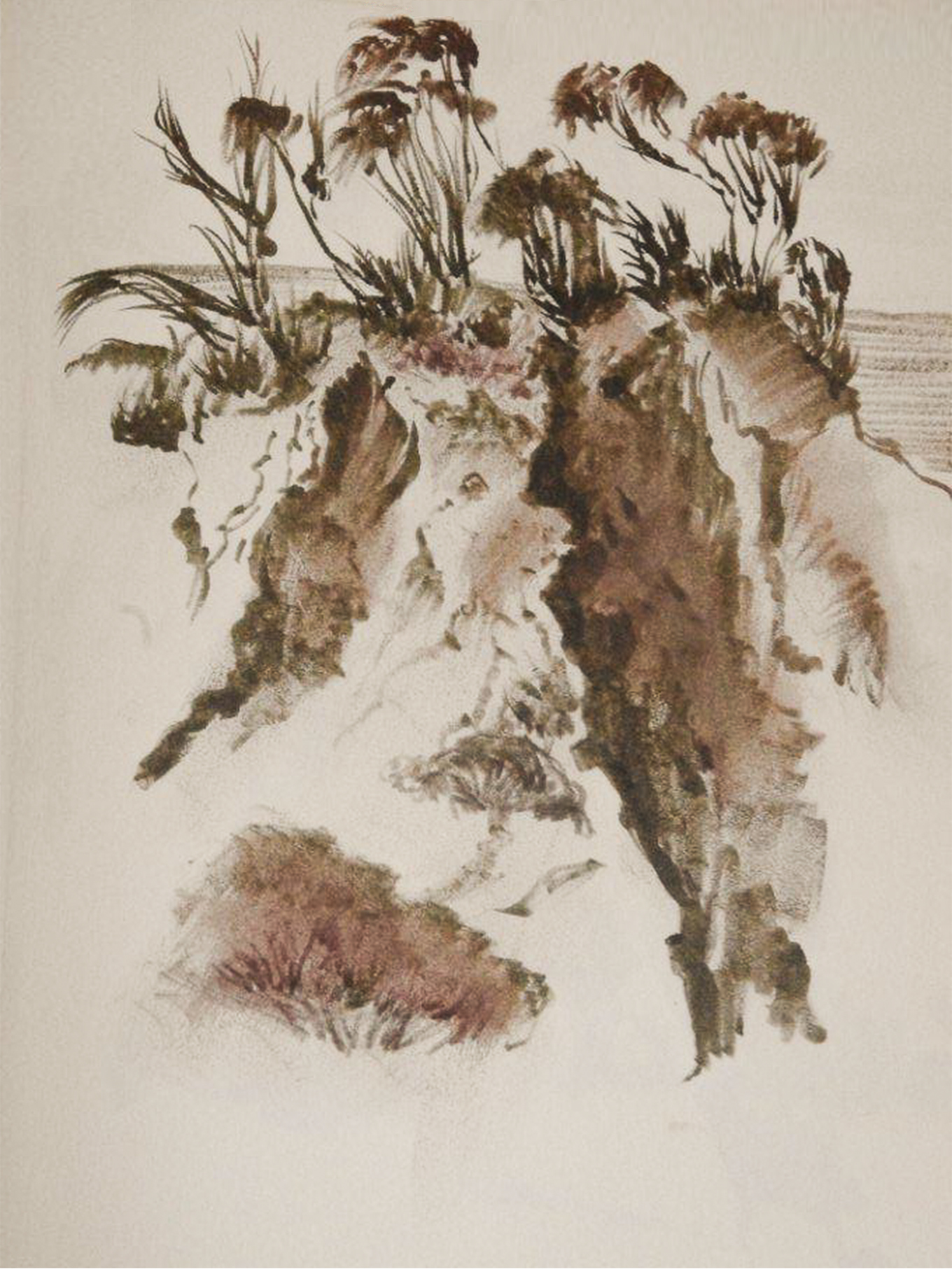
Sand dune drawing, Ian Sprague 1991; unsigned and undated. Made below Shirley Hannan's beach house inside Bournda National Park, NSW.

By 1981 Mungeribar was too onerous and too cold for Sprague's health. He sold the Upper Beaconsfield estate and moved to a house and studio he had bought at Mooney Mooney on the Hawkesbury River. Mungeribar was consumed by a firestorm on Ash Wednesday 1983. Sprague made pots and sculptures in a small pottery as well as works on paper. These include lithographs and monoprints. There are many drawings of the river, boats, the rocky escarpments. Other drawings are of his whippet Sprint. In 1992 he moved to a smaller house and studio at Sunshine Beach north of Noosa, Queensland. He died there two years later.

== Reputation ==
Ian Sprague: studio potter 1920–1994, a retrospective exhibition curated by Relton Leaver, was held at the Victorian State Craft Collection Gallery in 1995. The review in The Age, headed "Master potter hailed", wrote of his "legendary contribution to contemporary ceramics". Examples of Sprague's work are held by the National Gallery of Australia, Canberra; the National Gallery of Victoria; the Victorian Ceramic Group; the Powerhouse Museum, Sydney; the Ian Potter Museum of Art.

== Photos ==
A photo of Sprague by Mark Strizic in the collection of the National Gallery of Victoria is available online as Ian B. Sprague (1960s). It provides a rare glimpse of him working on a ceramic sculpture.

A photo by Kraig Carlstrom in Nine Artist Potters shows Sprague at Mungeribar in the late 1970s wearing a zippered turtleneck jumper over blue denim flares.

== Gallery ==
=== 1950s ===
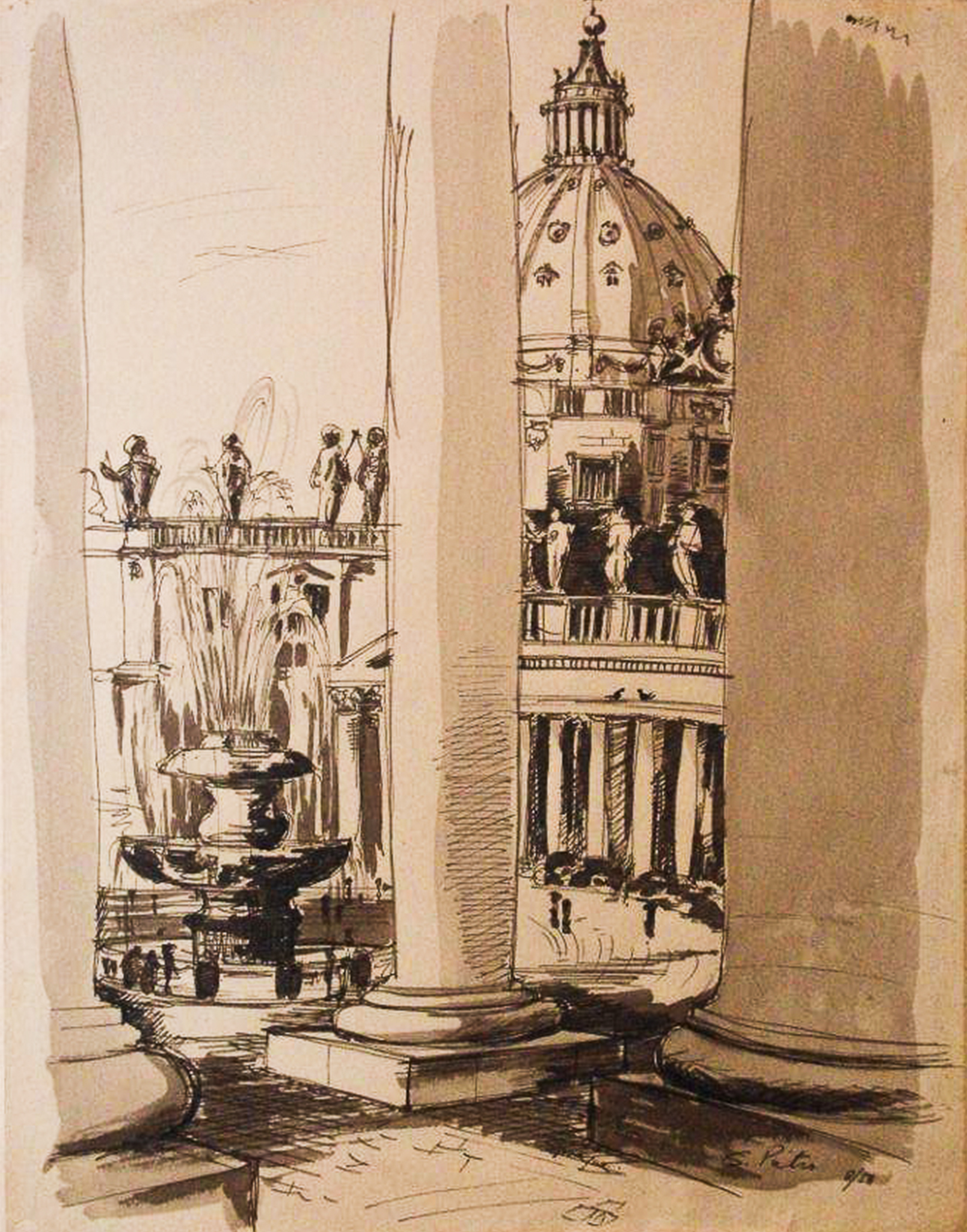
Ink pen and wash in a sketchbook; 380mm x 295mm; S. Pietro 8/58, signed Sprague.

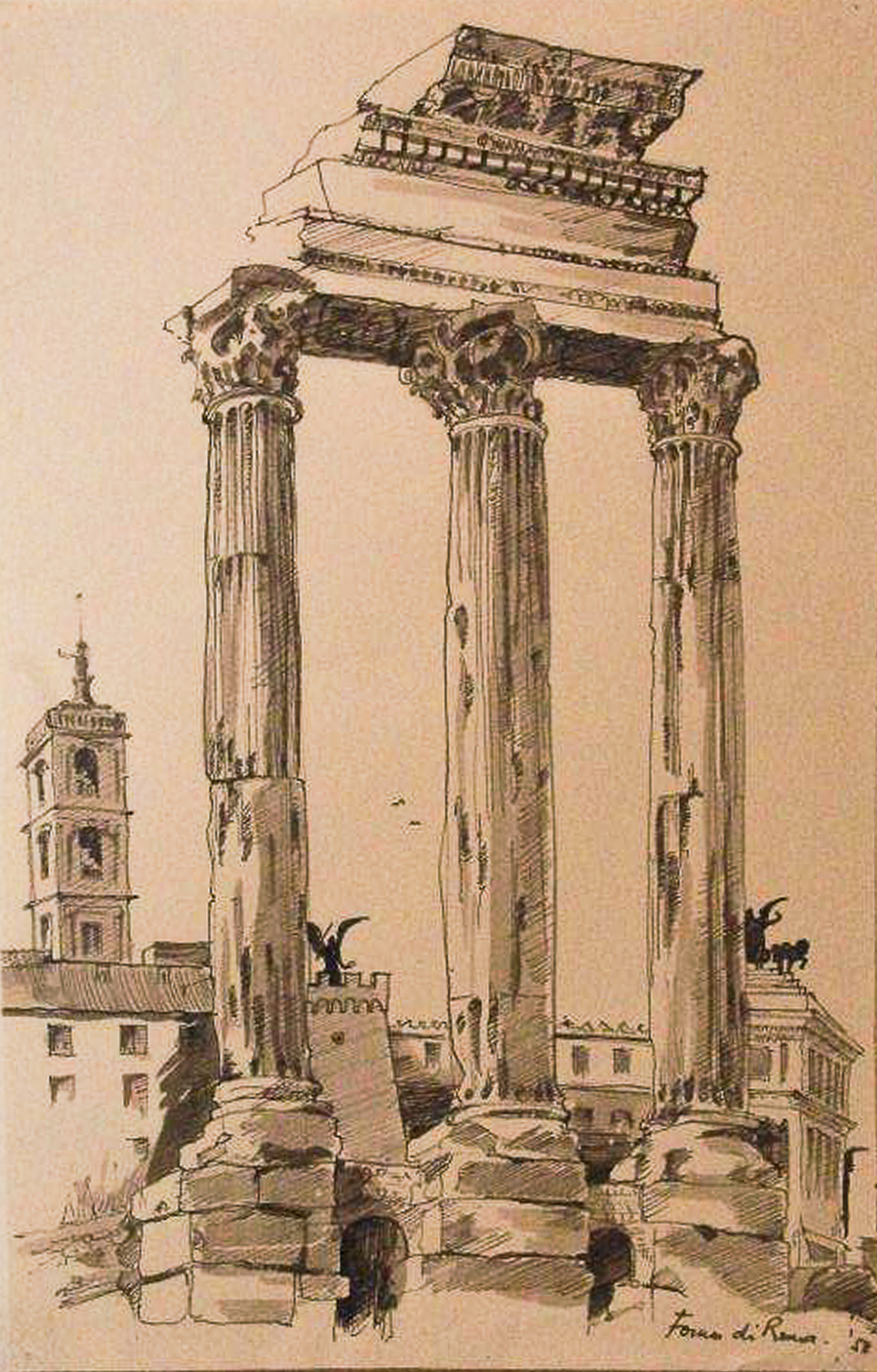
Ink pen and wash in a sketchbook; 350mm x 230mm; Forum di Roma ’58, signed Sprague.

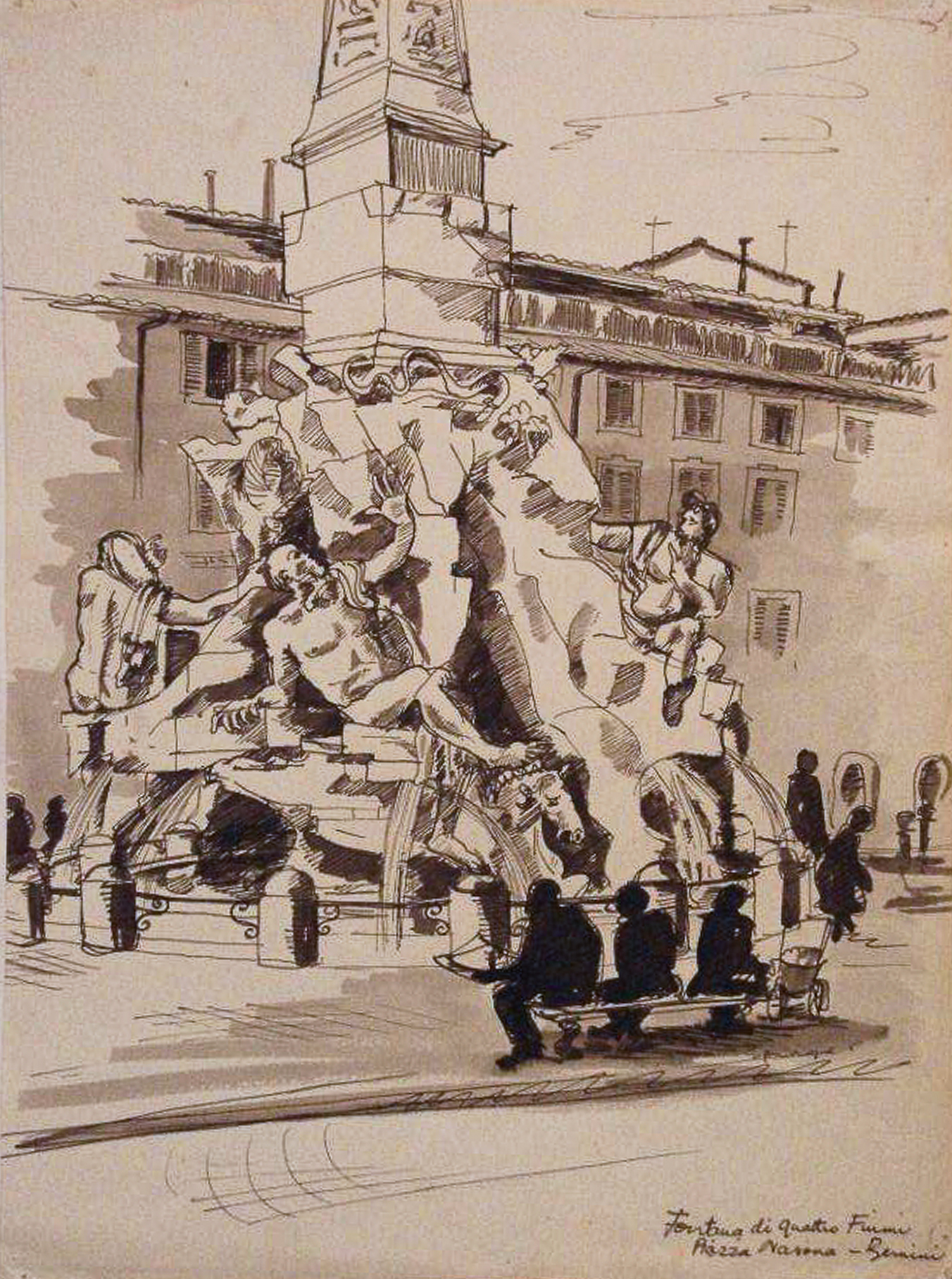
Ink pen and wash; 380mm x 280mm; Fontana di Quattro Fiumi—Piazza Navona—Bernini, signed Sprague, undated.

=== 1960s ===
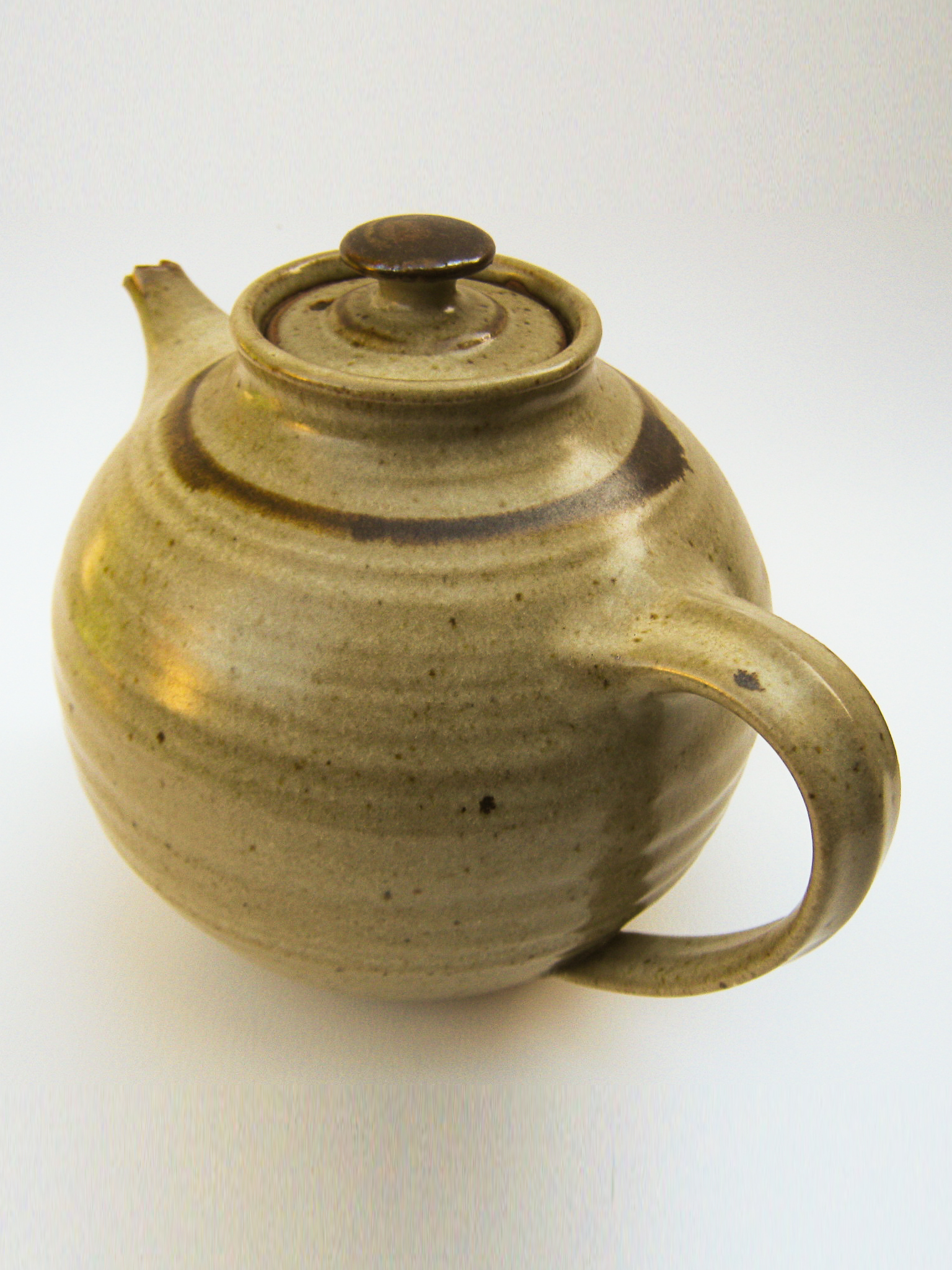
Ash-glazed tea pot, 1960s; damaged spout; 180mm x 235mm; Ian Sprague mark.

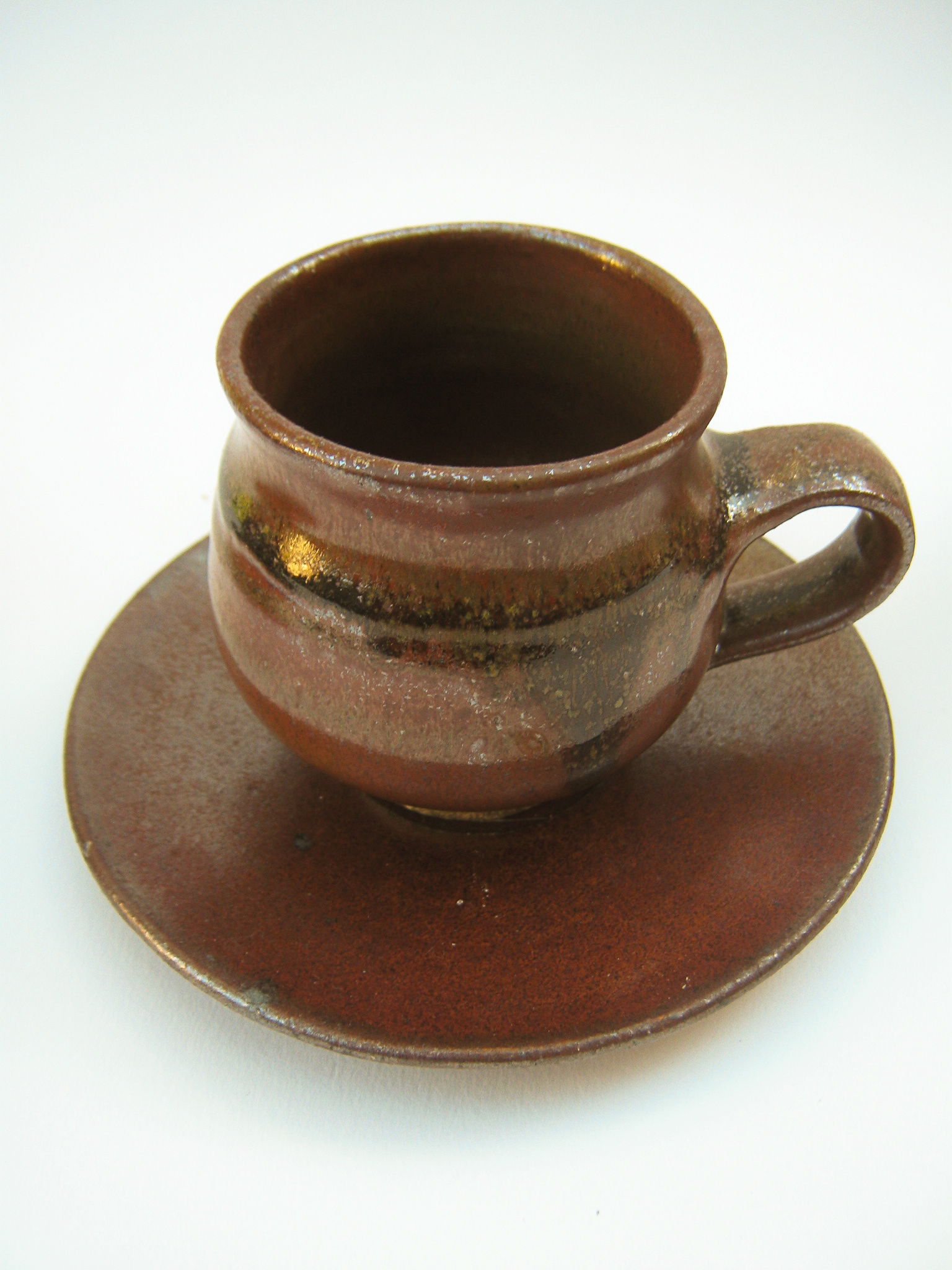
Iron-glazed stoneware cup and saucer from a set of six, 1960s; cup 105mm x 70mm, saucer 120mm x 20mm; Ian Sprague and Mungeribar marks.

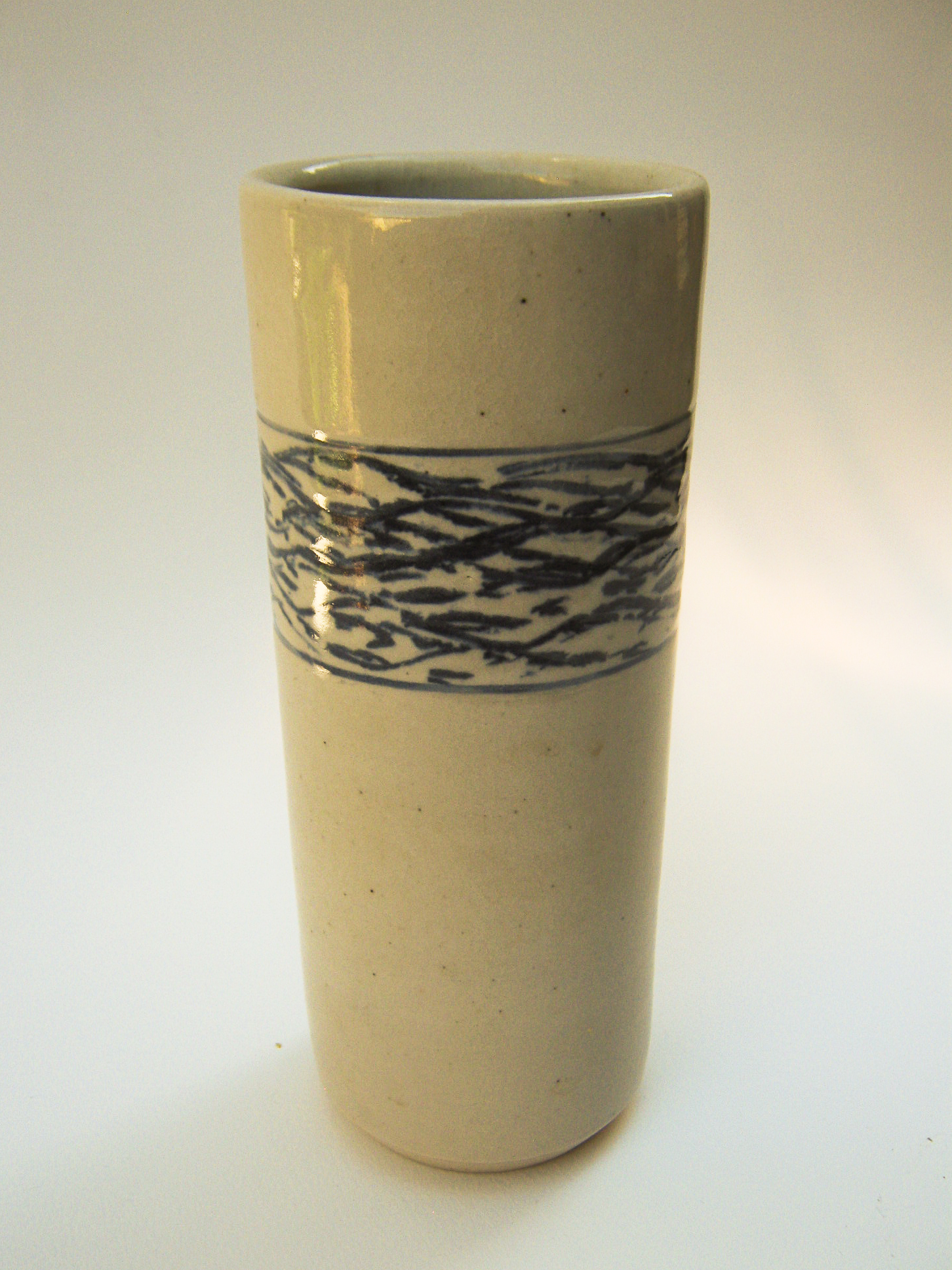
White glazed cylindrical vase, incised texture with a cobalt underglaze; 90mm x 80mm; Ian Sprague mark.

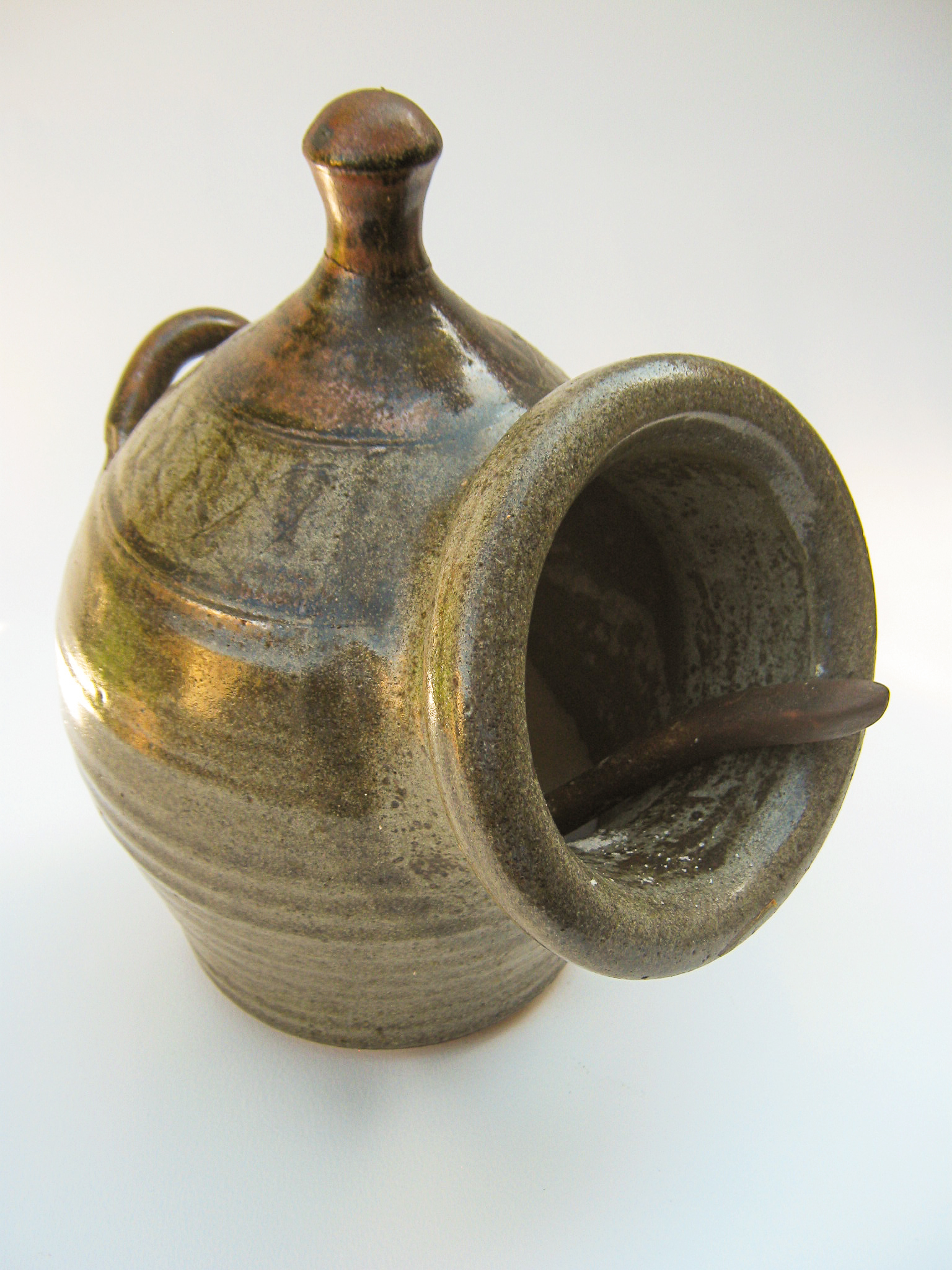
Ash-glazed salt pig, 1960s; 260mm x 210mm; Ian Sprague mark.

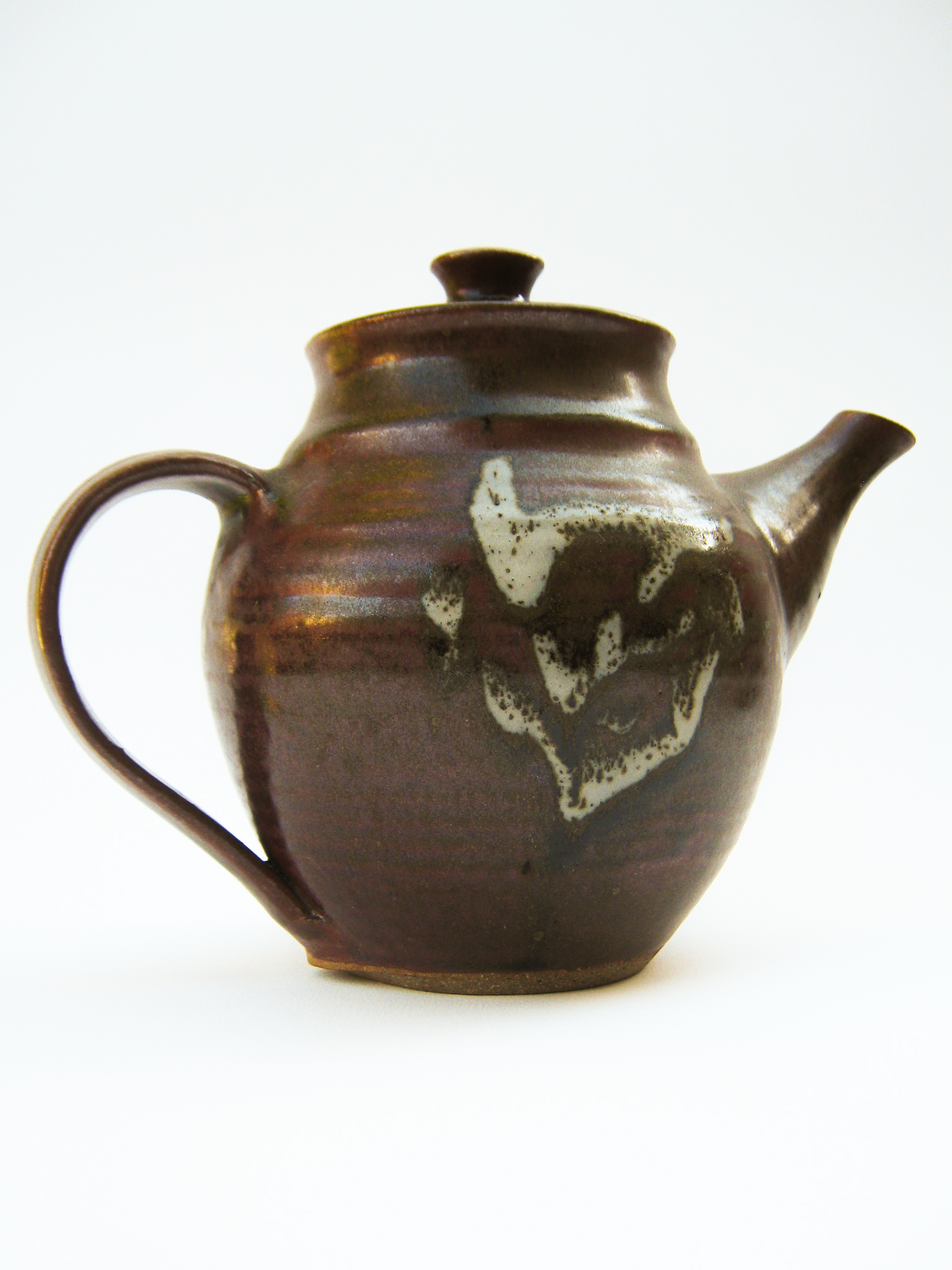
Iron-glazed teapot with white-glazed decoration, 1960s: 180mm x 220mm; Ian Sprague mark.

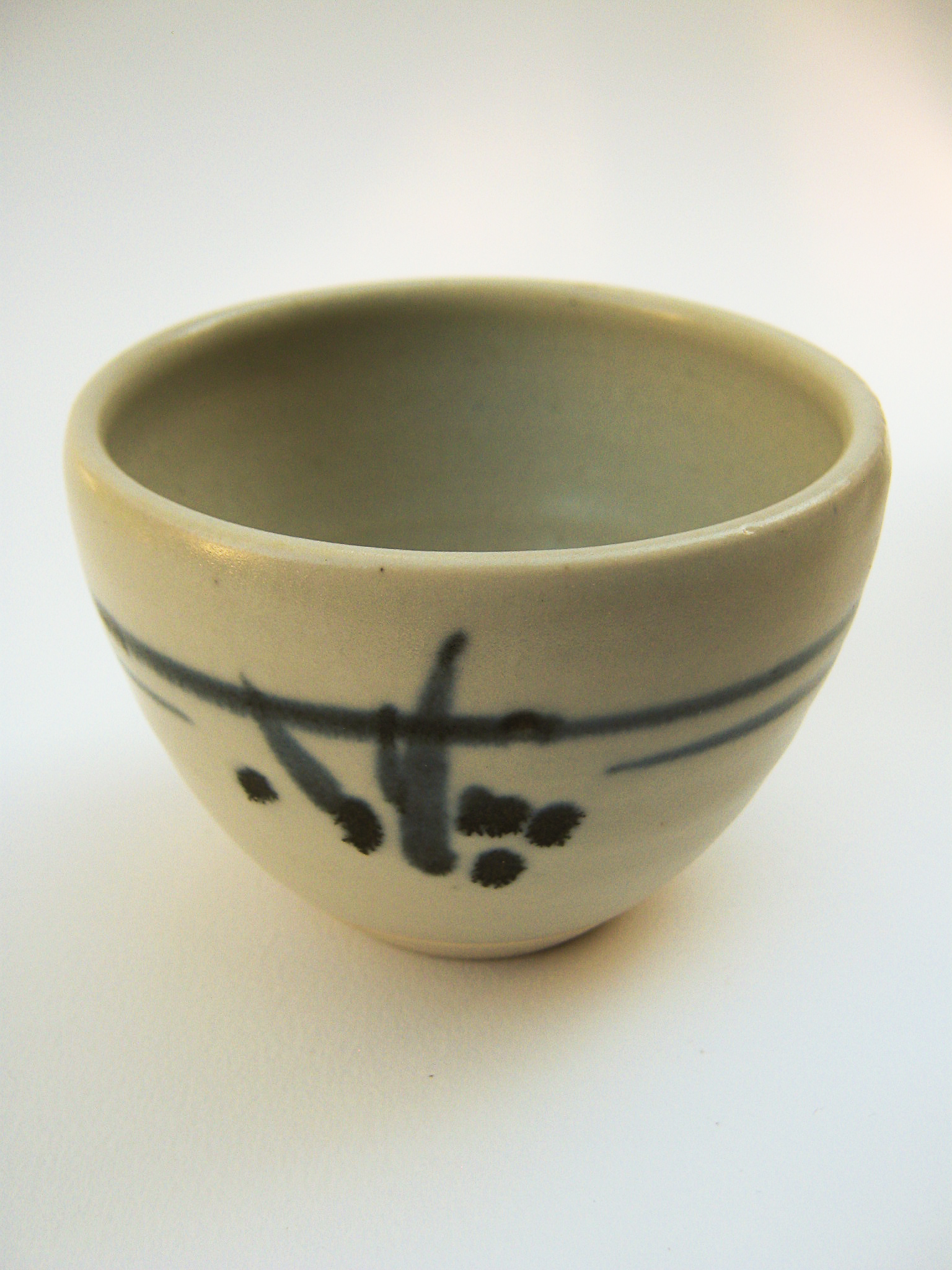
One of a set of six cups, white-glazed with cobalt decoration, 1960s; 100mm x 70mm; Ian Sprague mark.

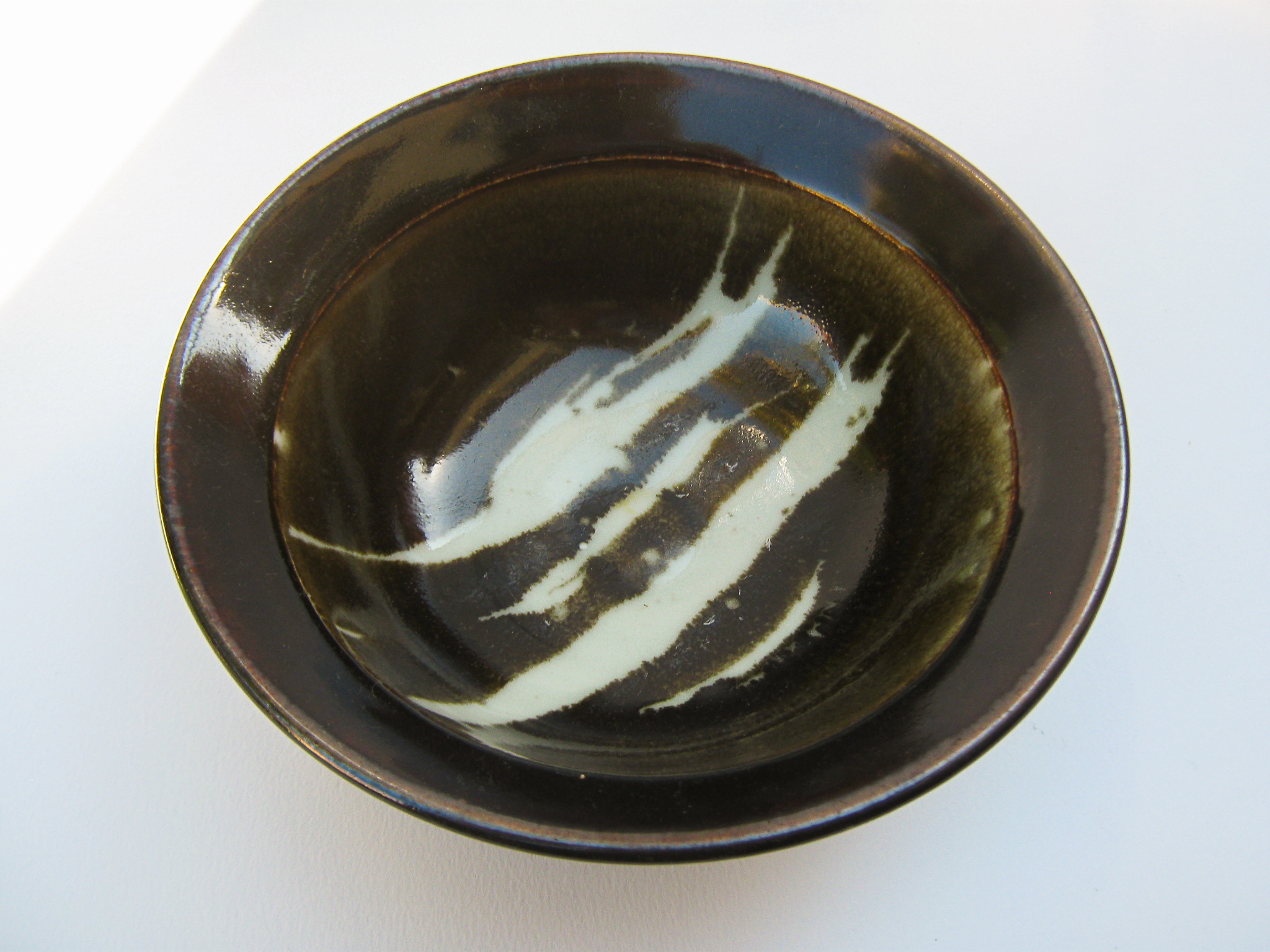
Iron-glazed bowl with white glazed splashes from a production line set, 1960s; 170mm x 65mm; Mungeribar stamp.

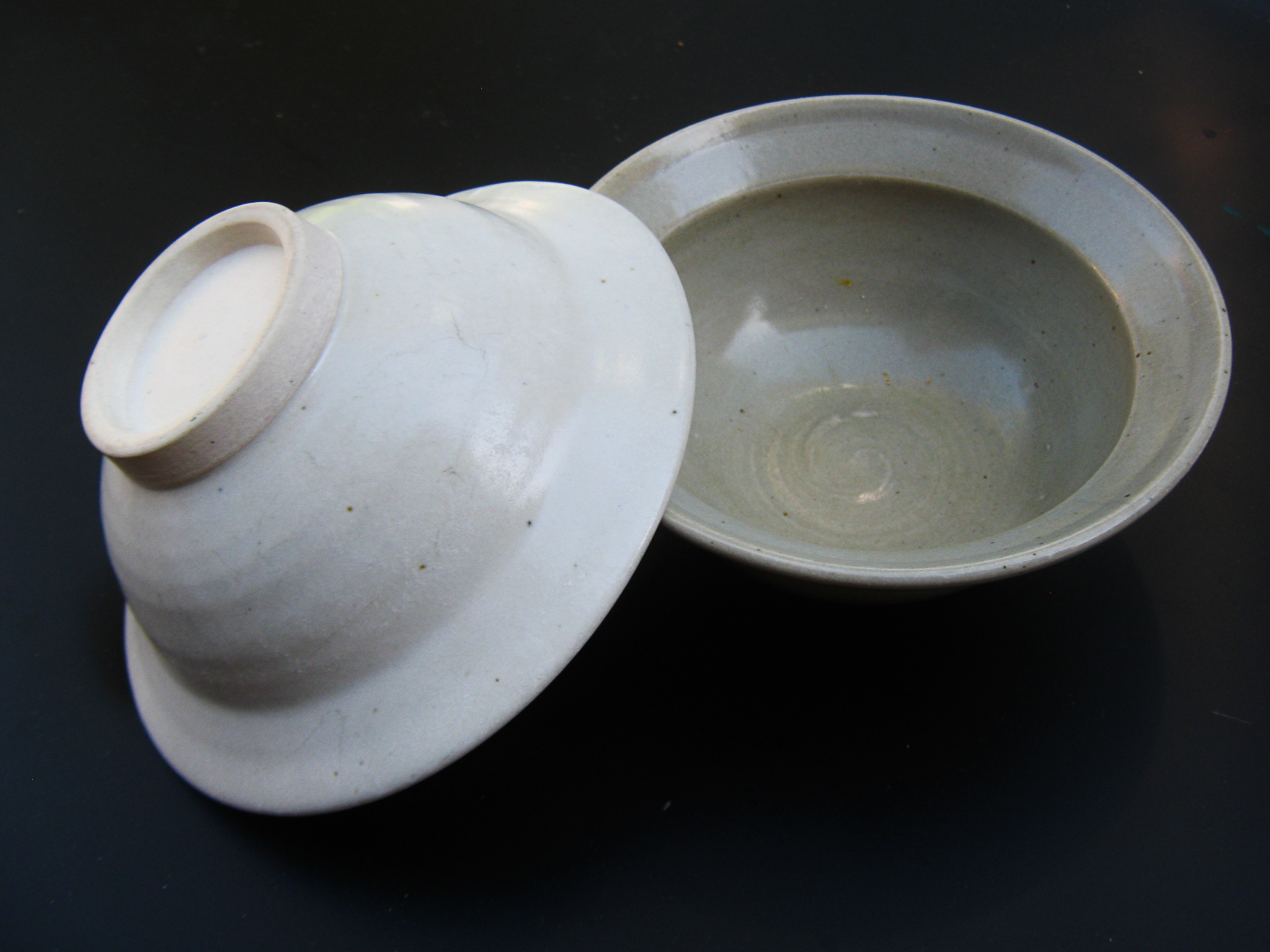
White porcelain bowls from a production line set, 1960s; 170mm x 65mm; Mungeribar stamp.

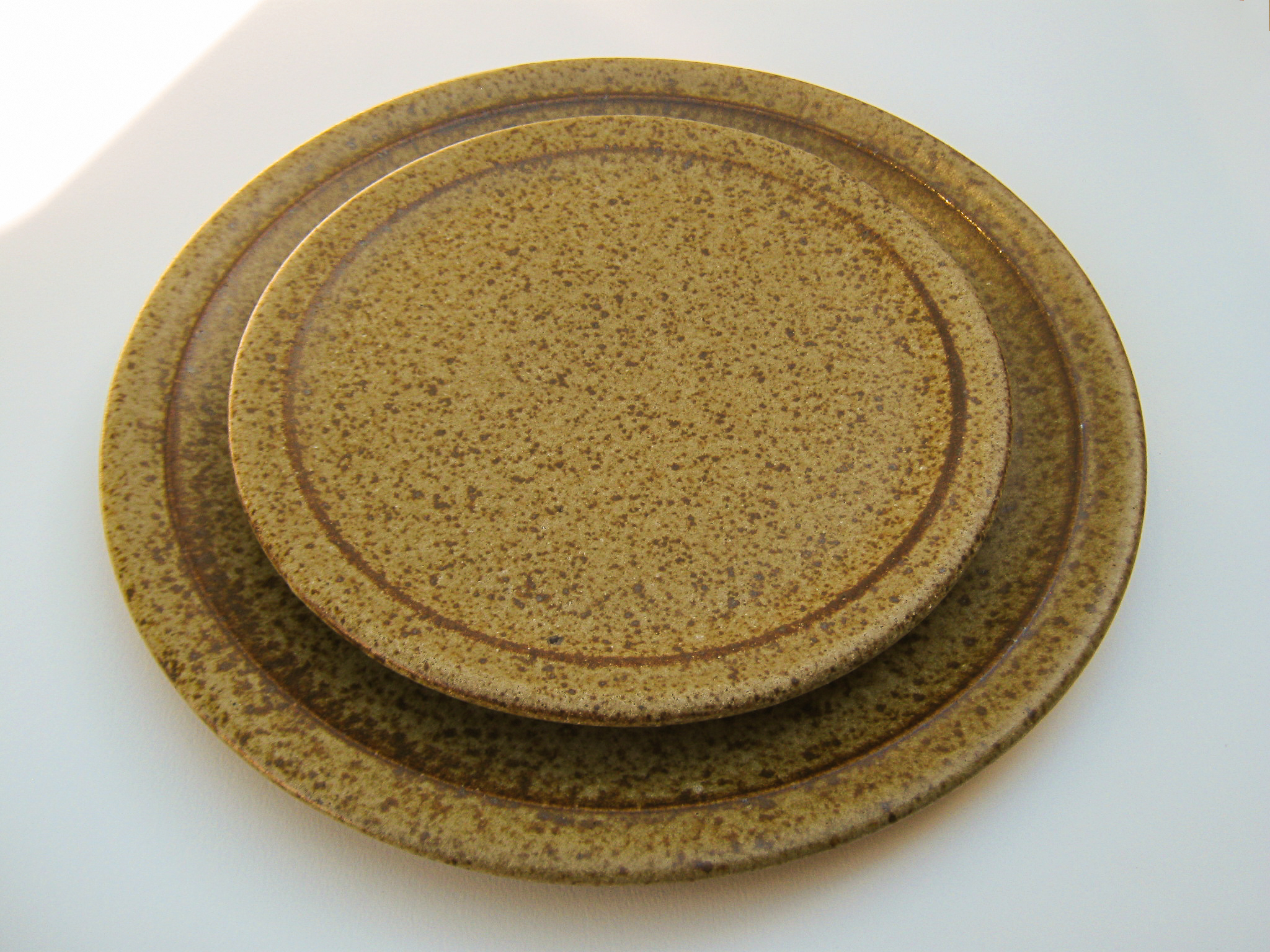
Ash-glazed dinner and side plates from a production line set, 1960s; 280mm x 24mm, 205mm x 22mm; both Mungeribar stamped.

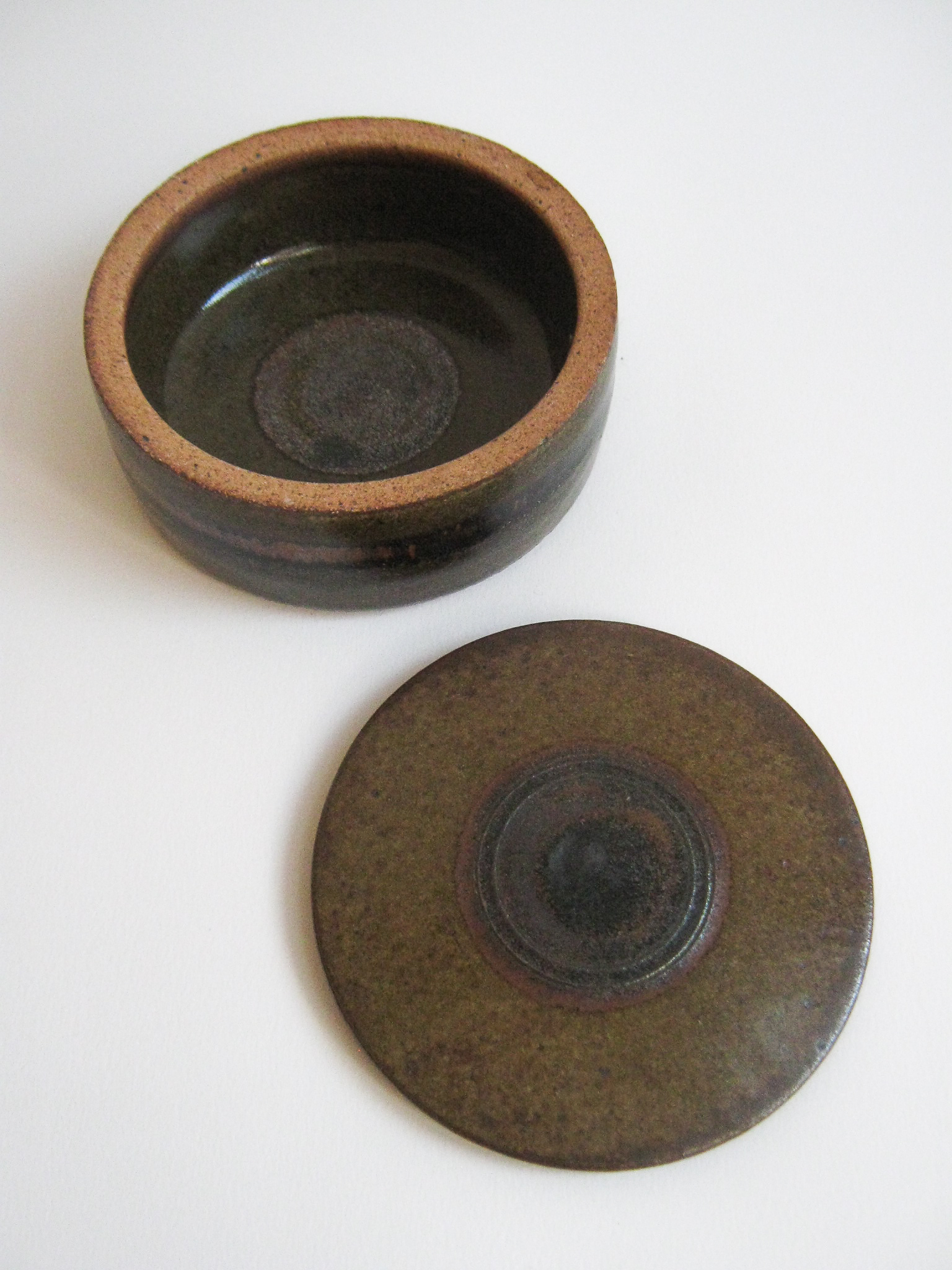
Lidded stoneware canister from a set, 1960s; 12cm x 5cm; Ian Sprague mark.

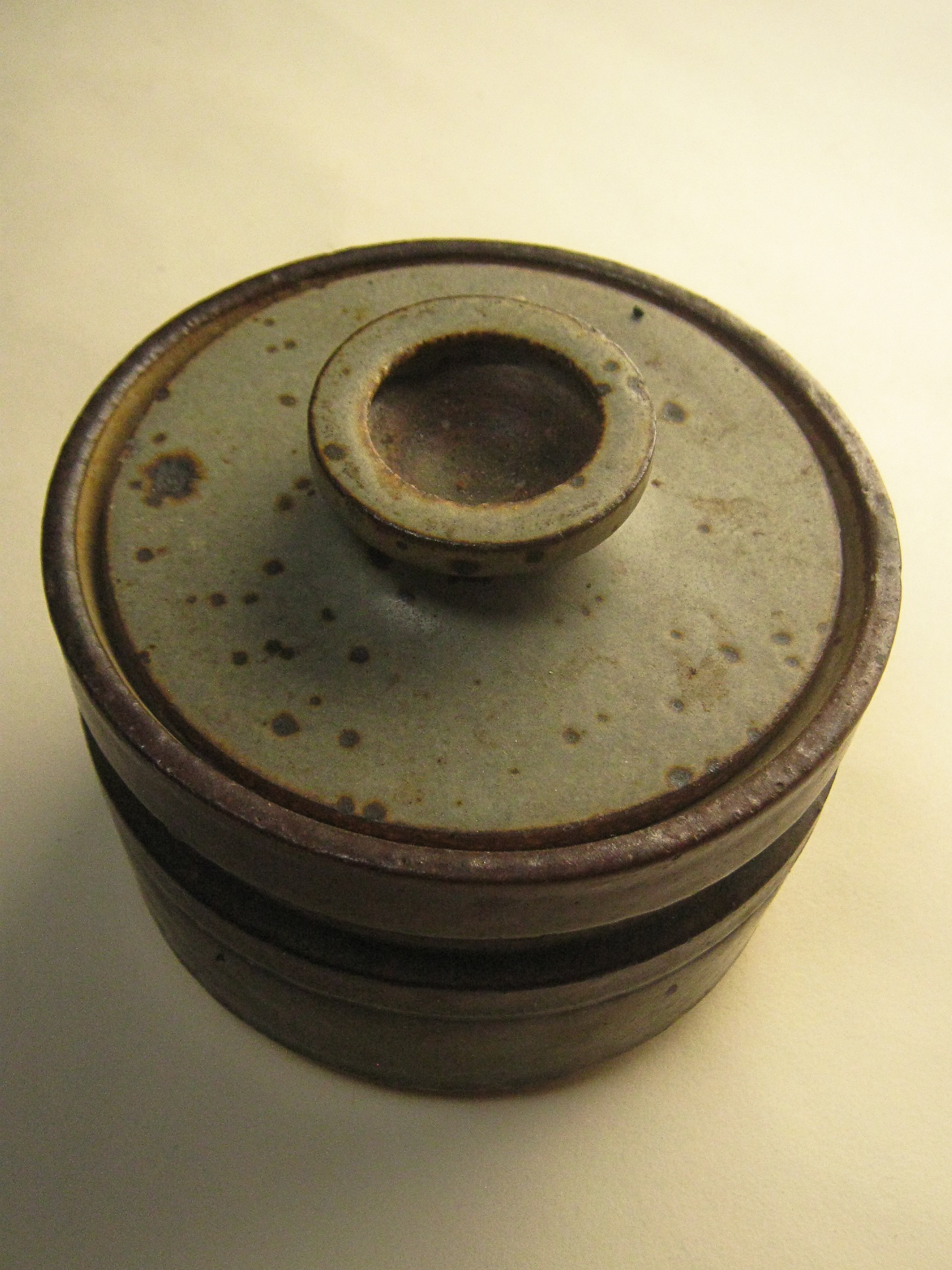
Ian Sprague stoneware canister from a set, 1960s; 10cm x 18cm; no stamp.

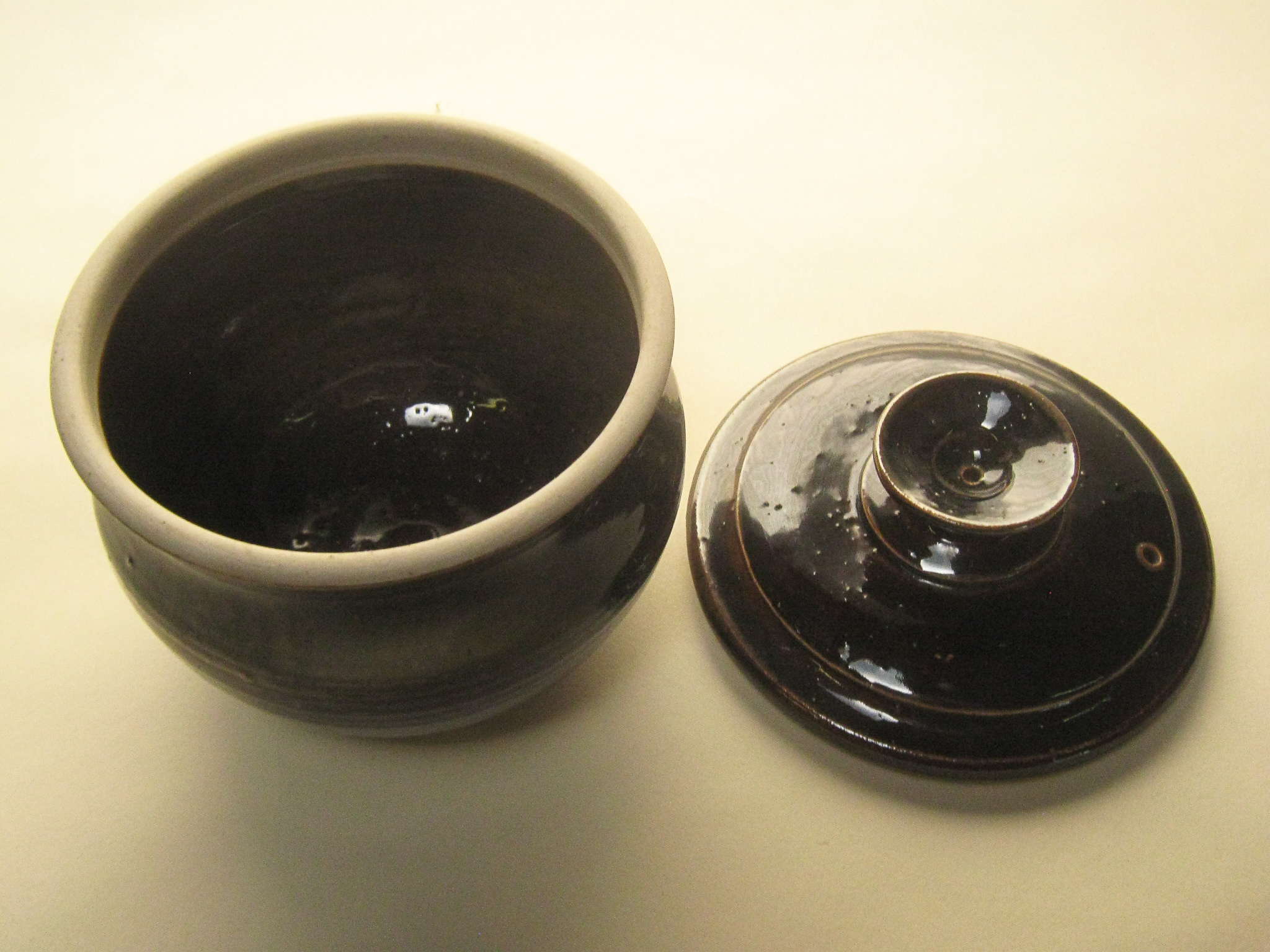
Lidded pottery jar Tenmoku glazed; 14cm x 15cm; Ian Sprague mark.

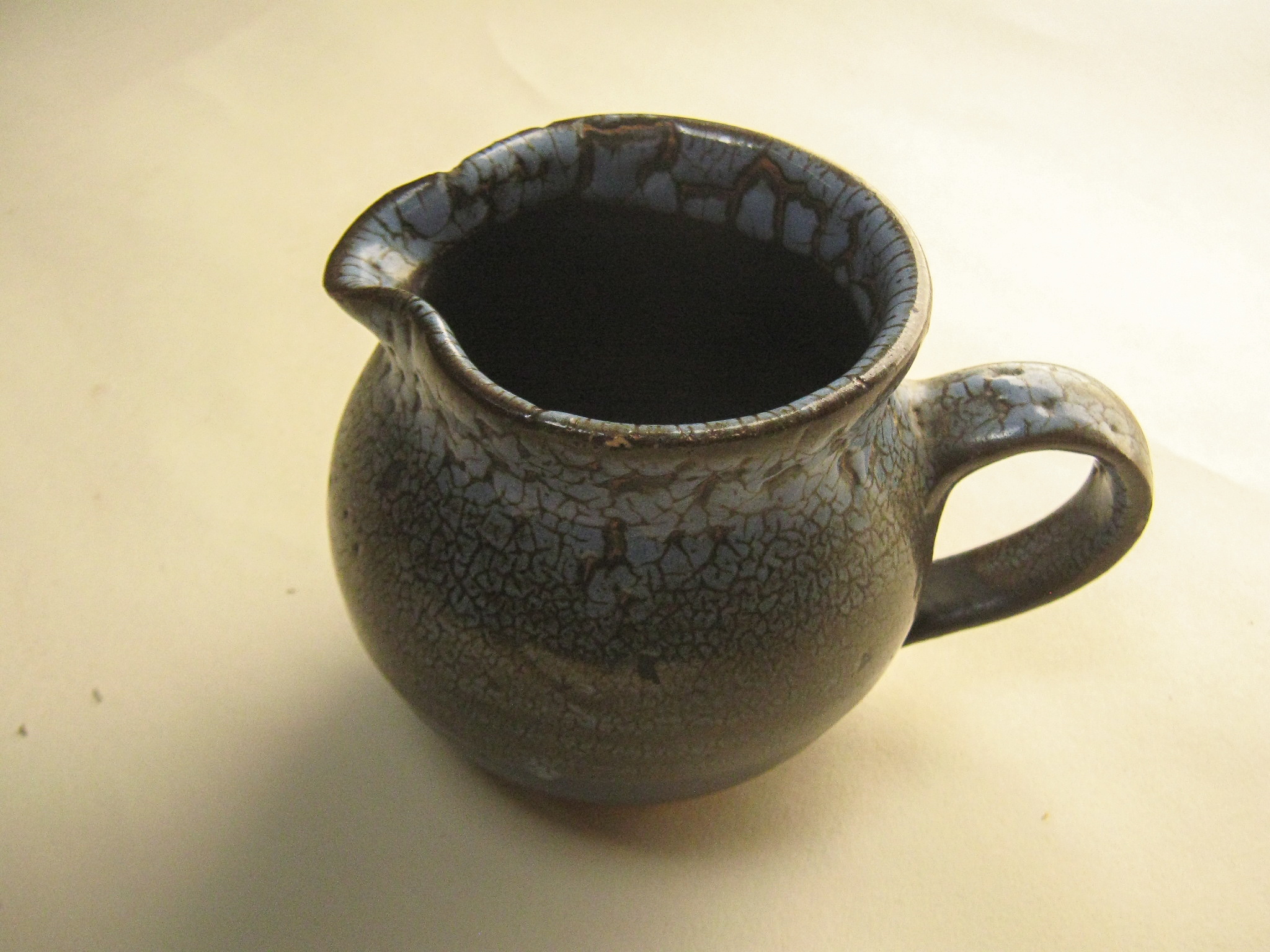
Glazed jug, 1970s; 10cm x 15cm; Ian Sprague mark.

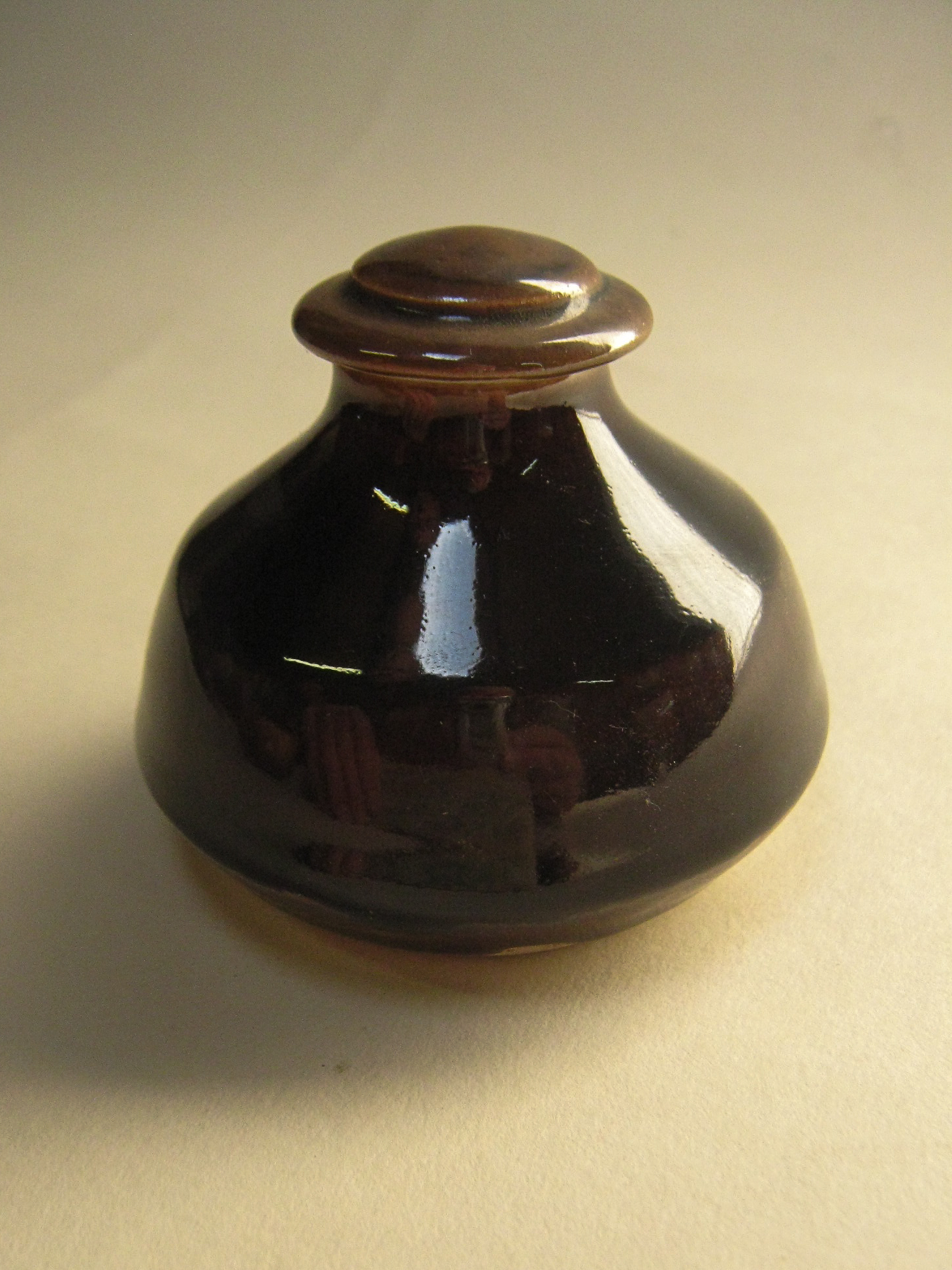
Small lidded jar with Tenmoku glaze, early 1970s; 6.5cm x 8cm; Ian Sprague mark.

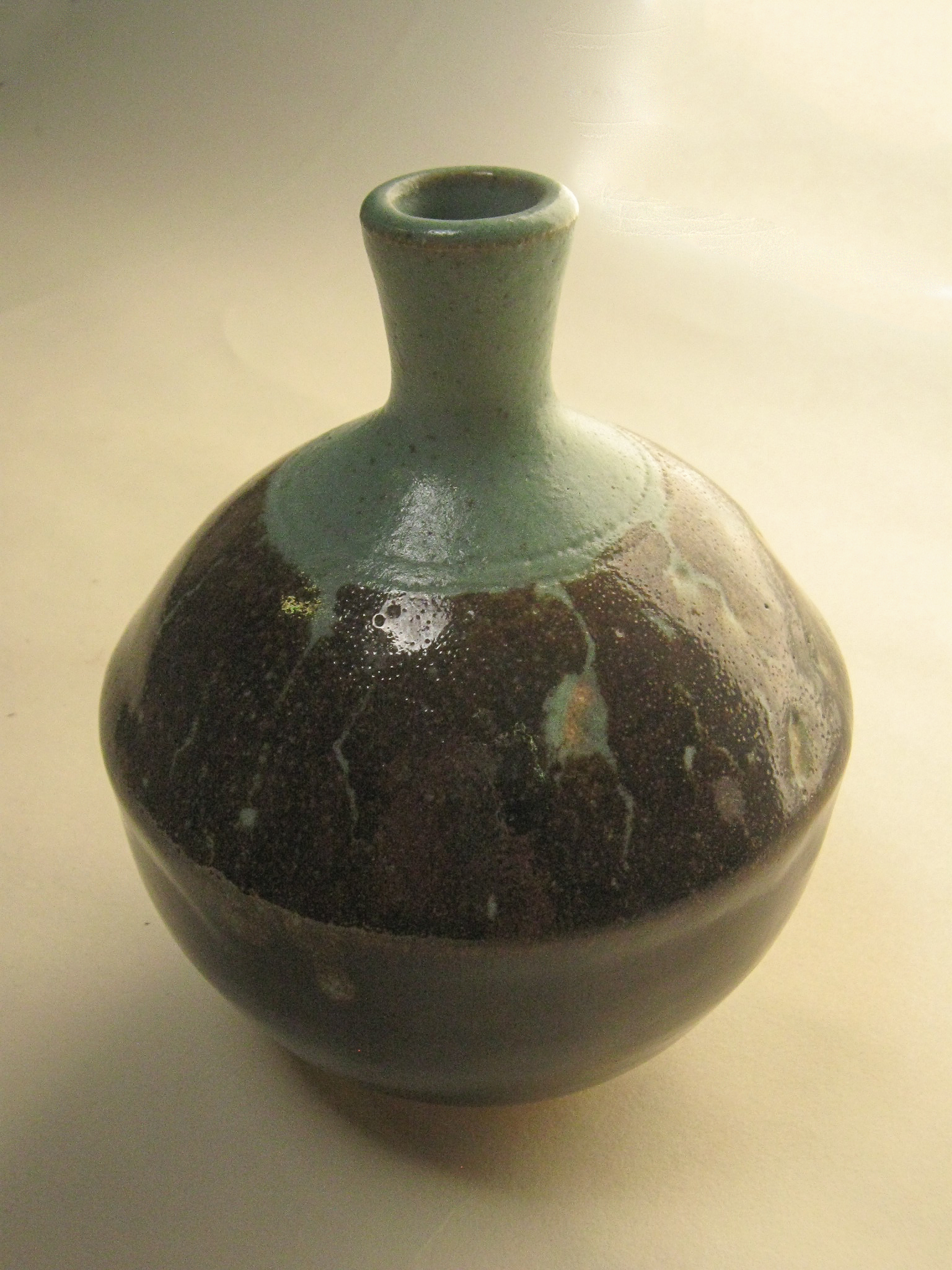
Two-tone bottle; 14cm x 14cm; Ian Sprague mark.

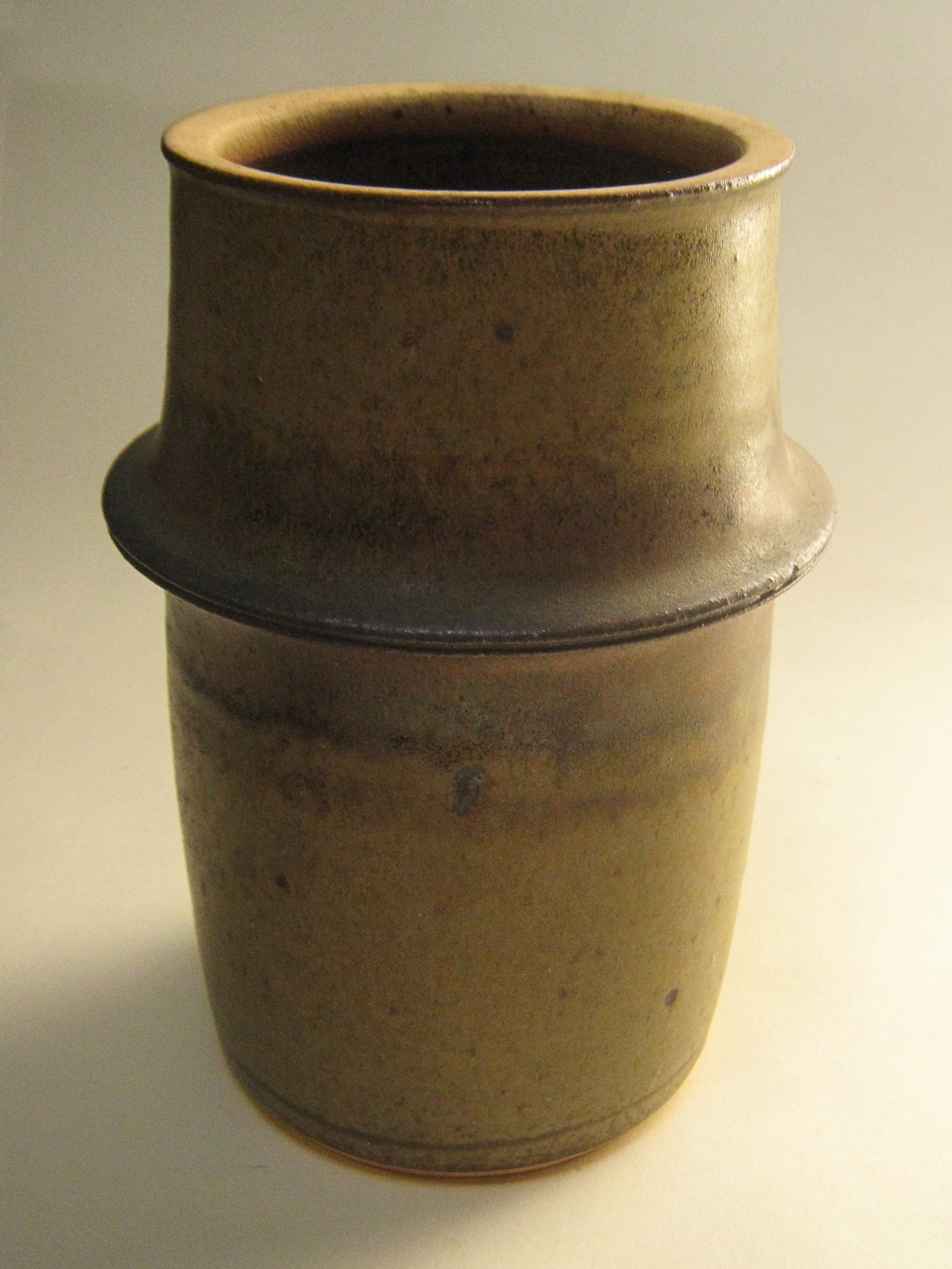
Jar with ridge, 1970s; 23cm x 18cm; Ian Sprague mark.

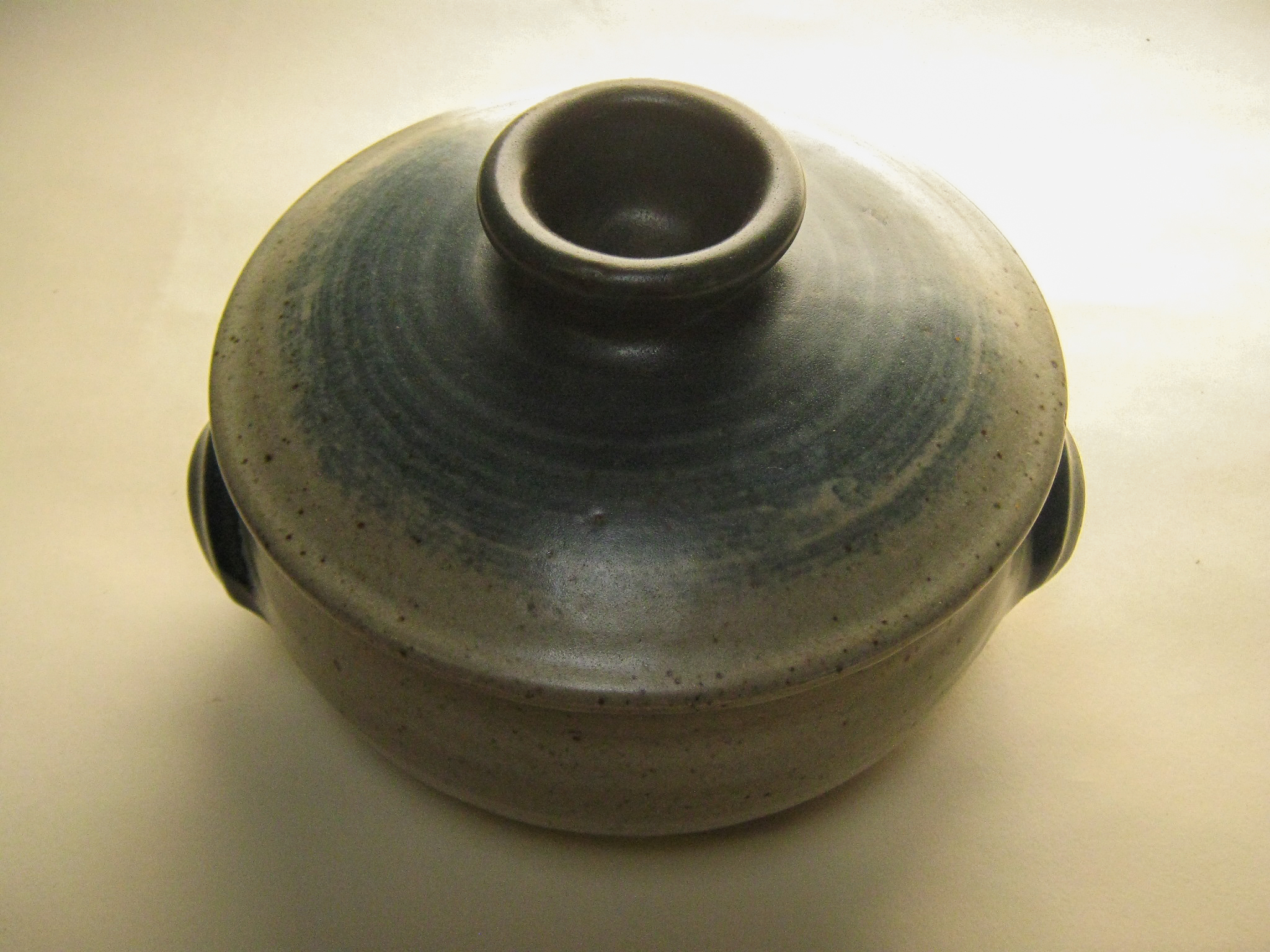
Rice steamer, 1970s; 15cm x 24cm; Ian Sprague mark.

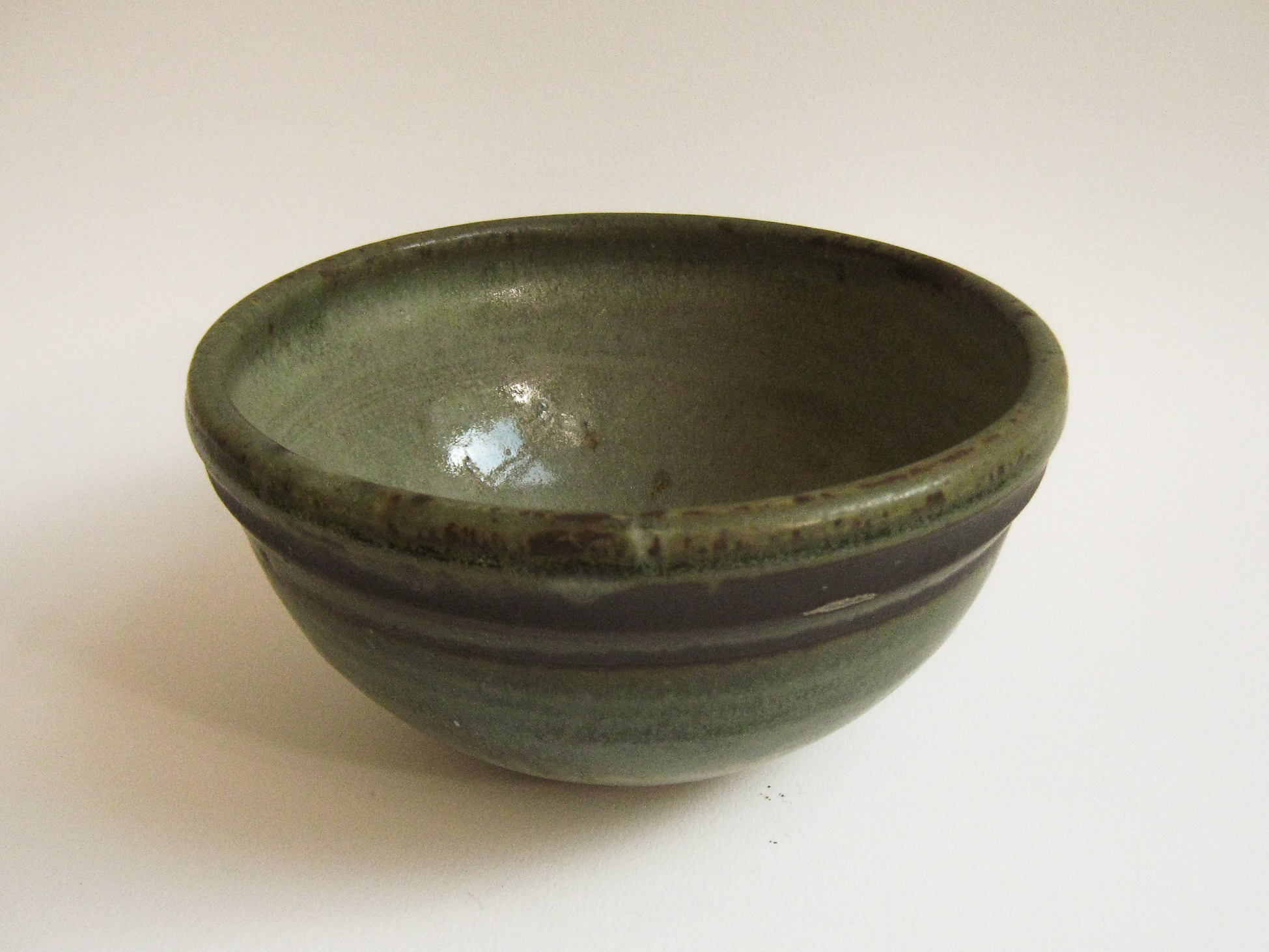
Thrown bowl in the Bernard Leach manner, 1960s; 13.5cm x 9cm; Ian Sprague mark.

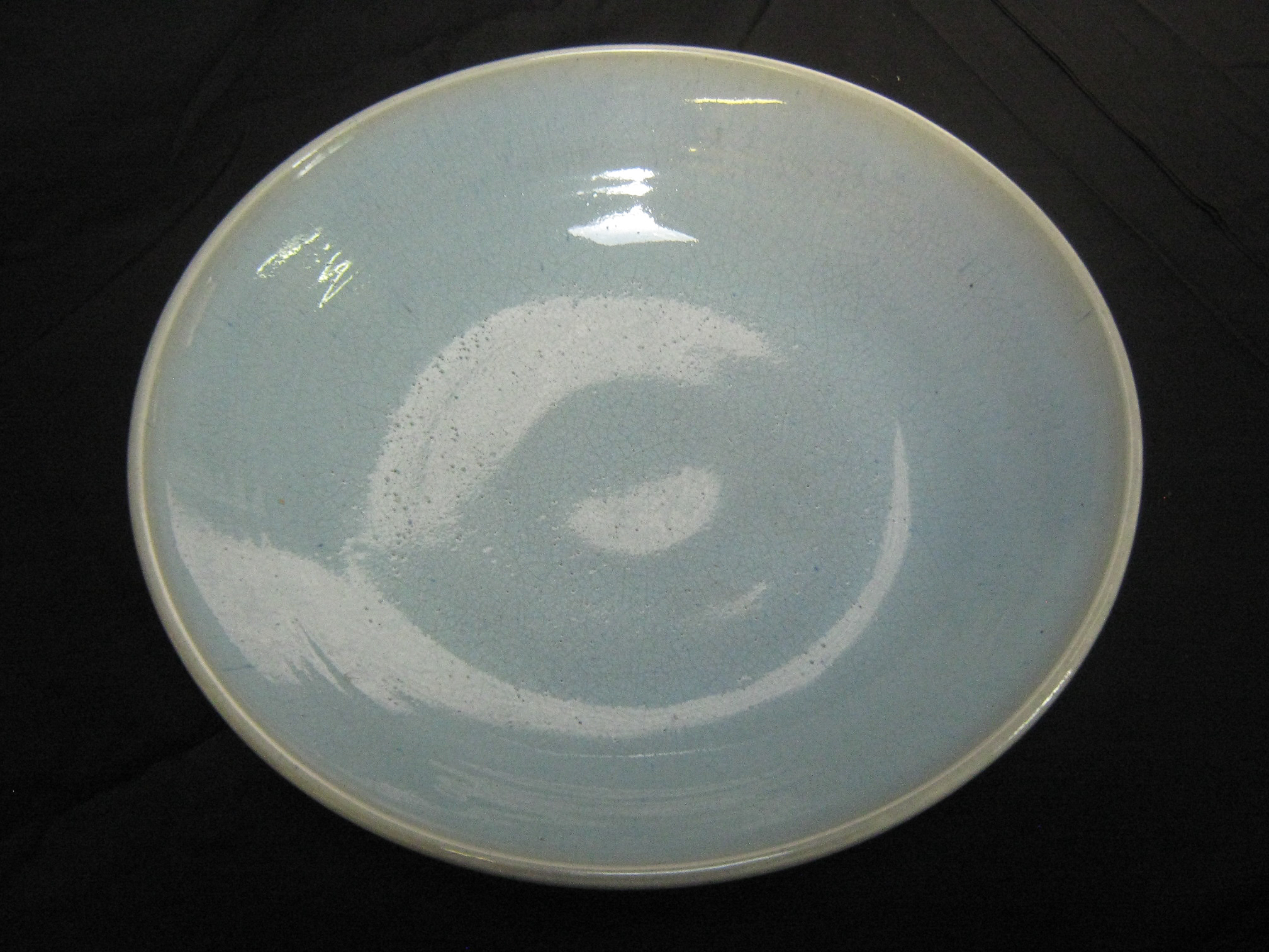
Chün glazed dish early to mid-1970s; 38cm x 8cm; Ian Sprague mark.

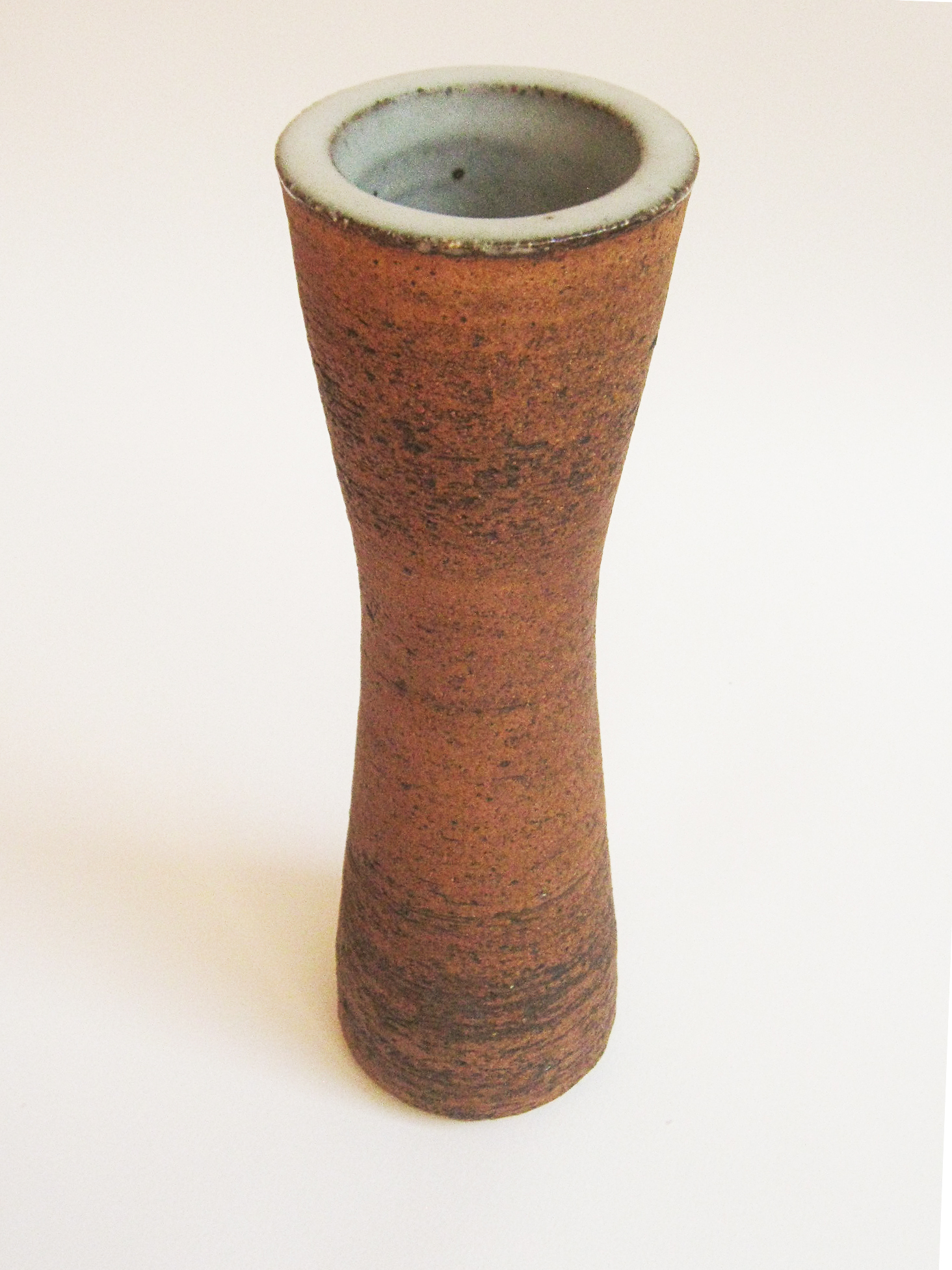
Textured stoneware vase, ash-glazed on a raw body, 1970s; 7.5cm x 25cm; Ian Sprague mark.

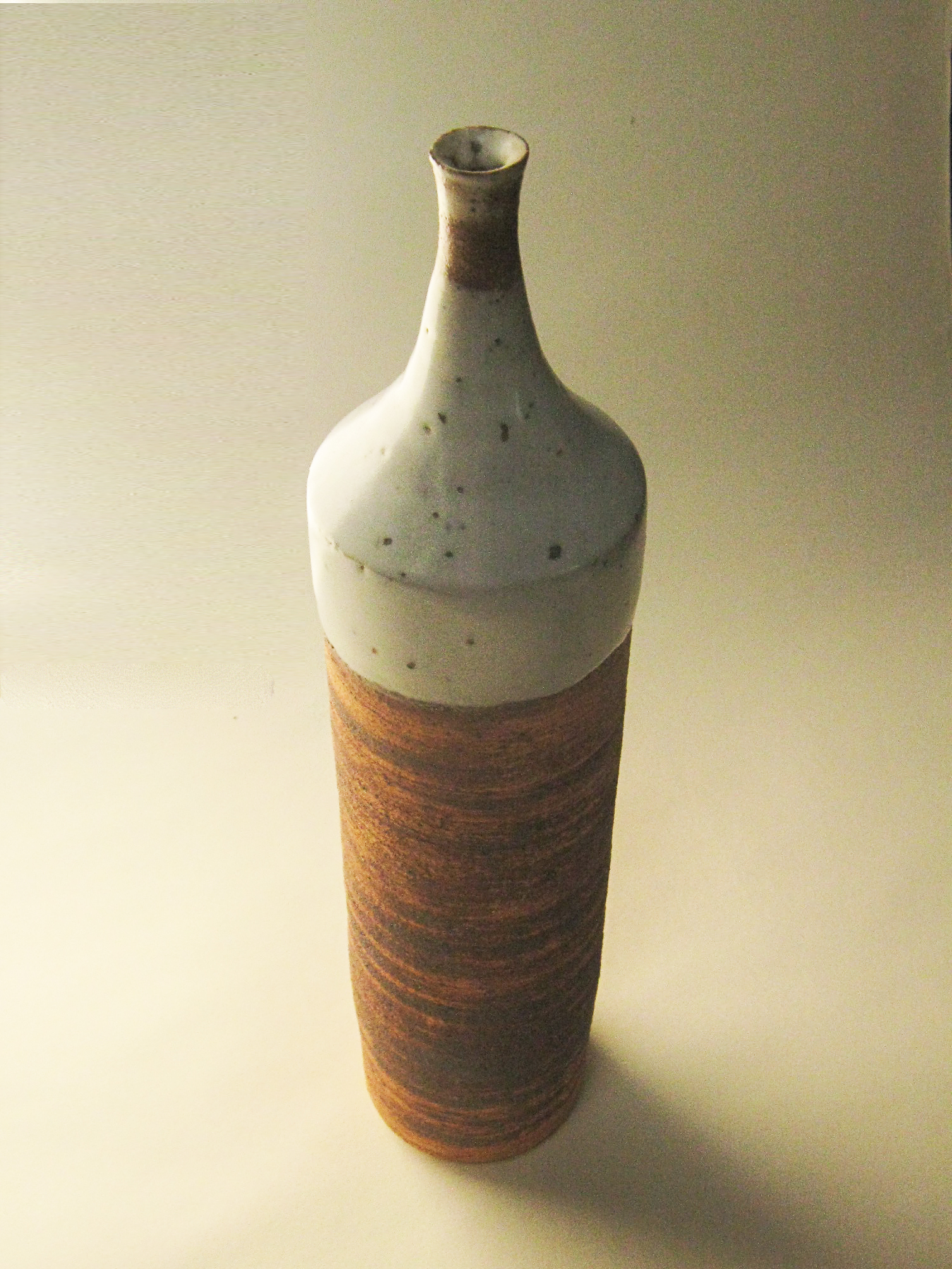
Bottle, ash-glazed on a raw body, 1970s; 38cm x 9cm; Ian Sprague mark

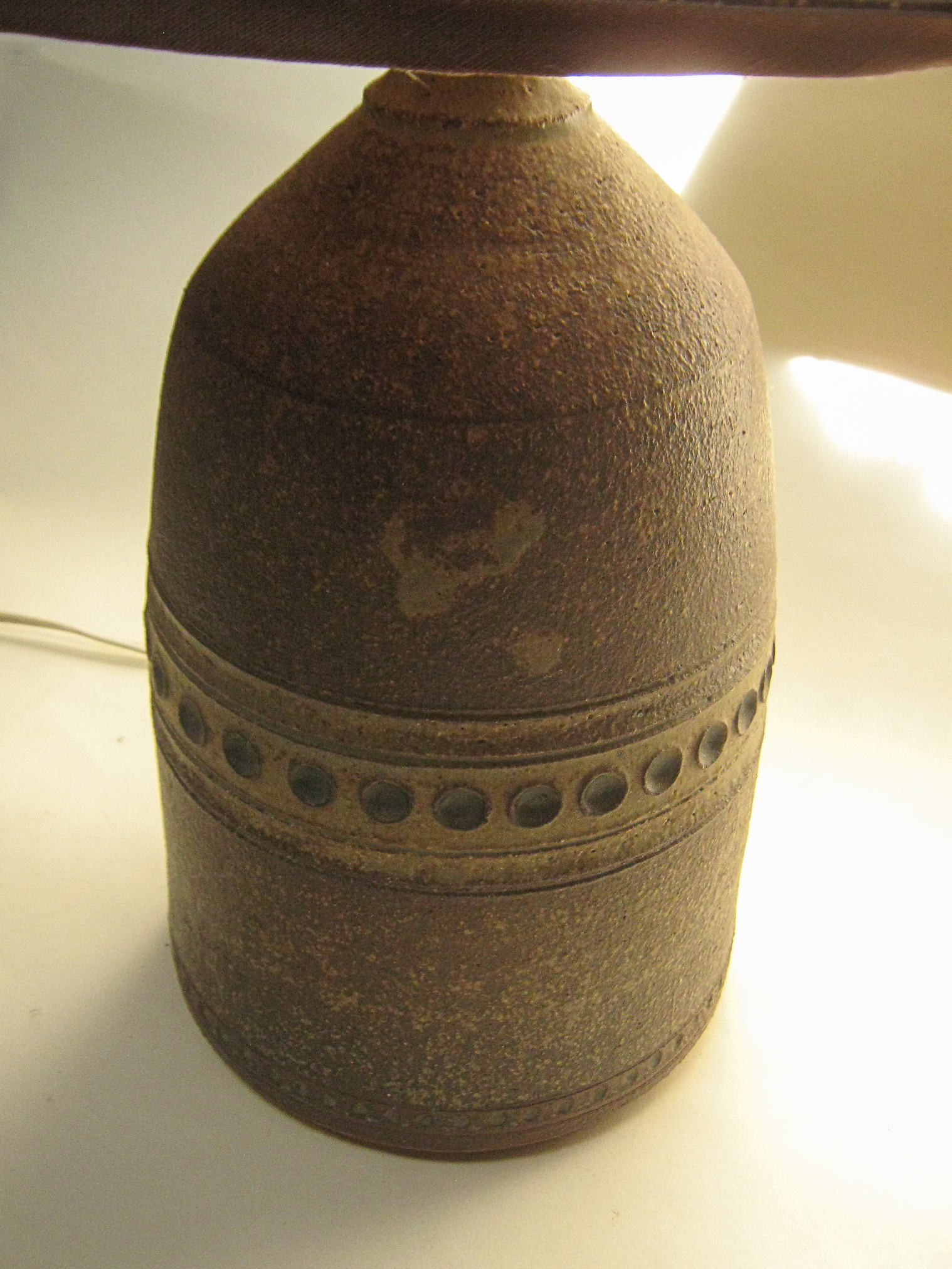
Lamp base (with shade), brown dry glaze with central design, 1970s; 32cm x 22cm; Ian Sprague mark.

=== 1970s ===
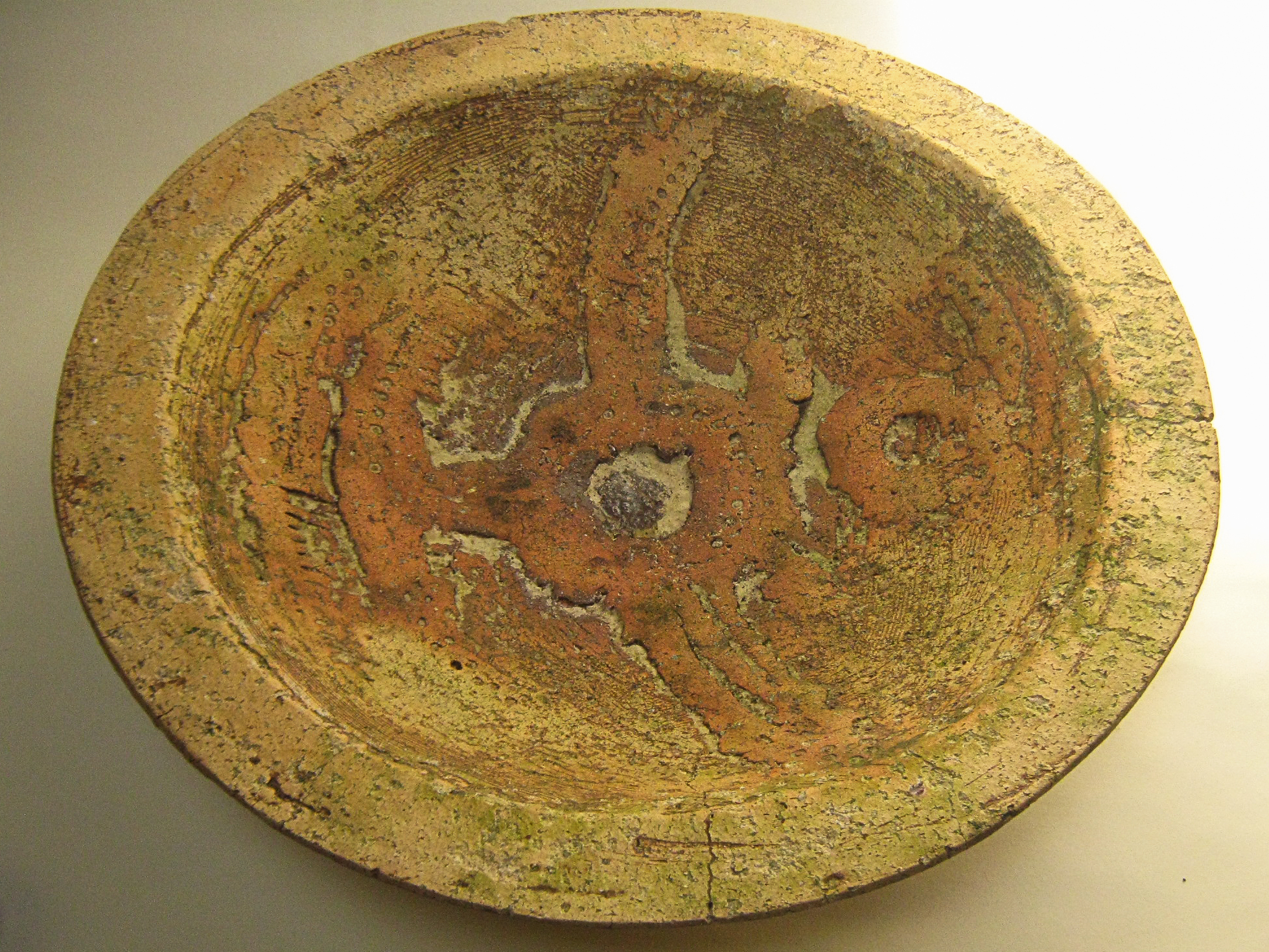
Fireclay bowl with iron oxide over decoration, 1970s; 12cm x 52cm; Ian Sprague and Mungeribar marks.

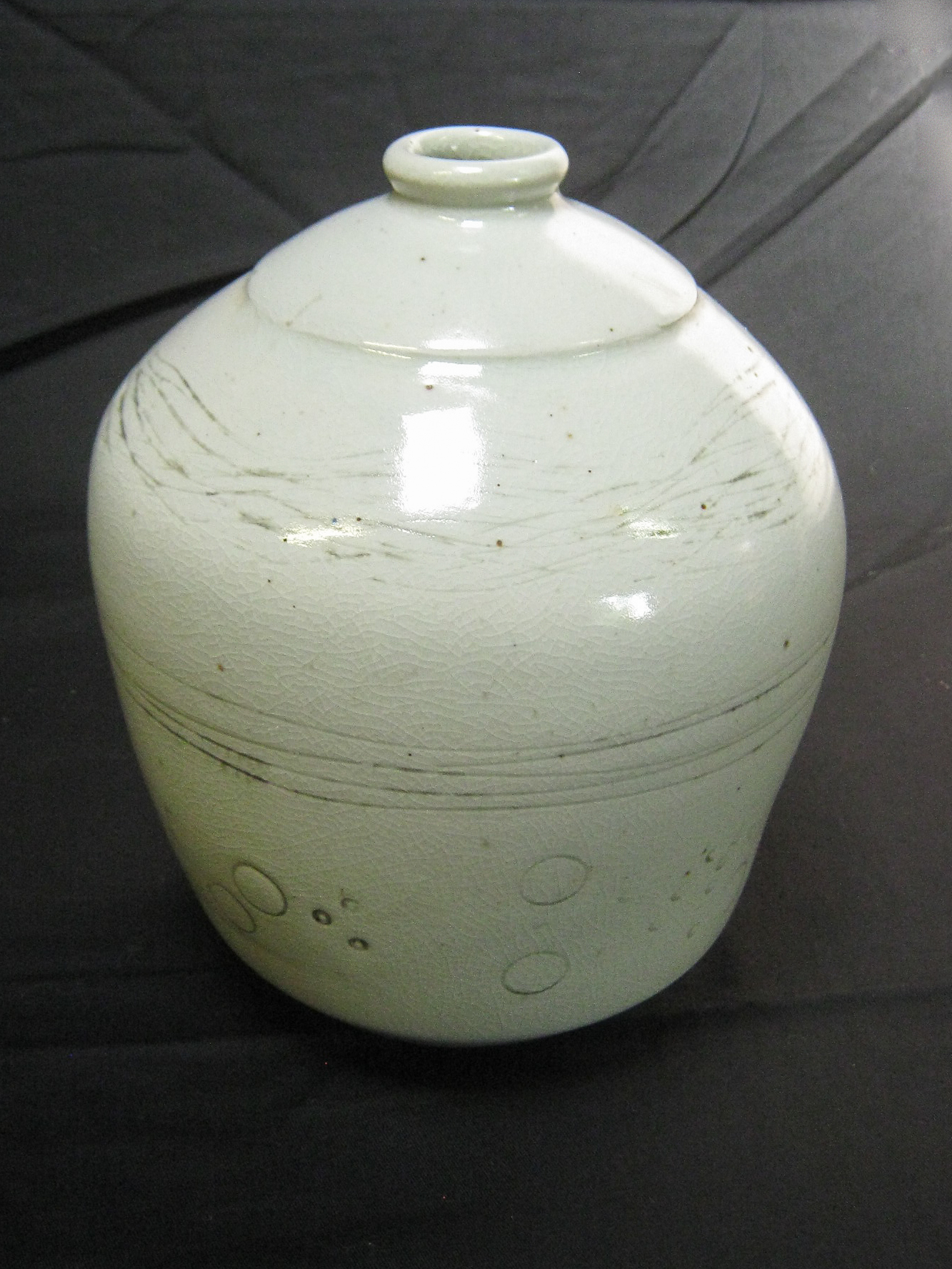
White jar with circles; 24cm x 18cm; Ian Sprague and Mungeribar marks.

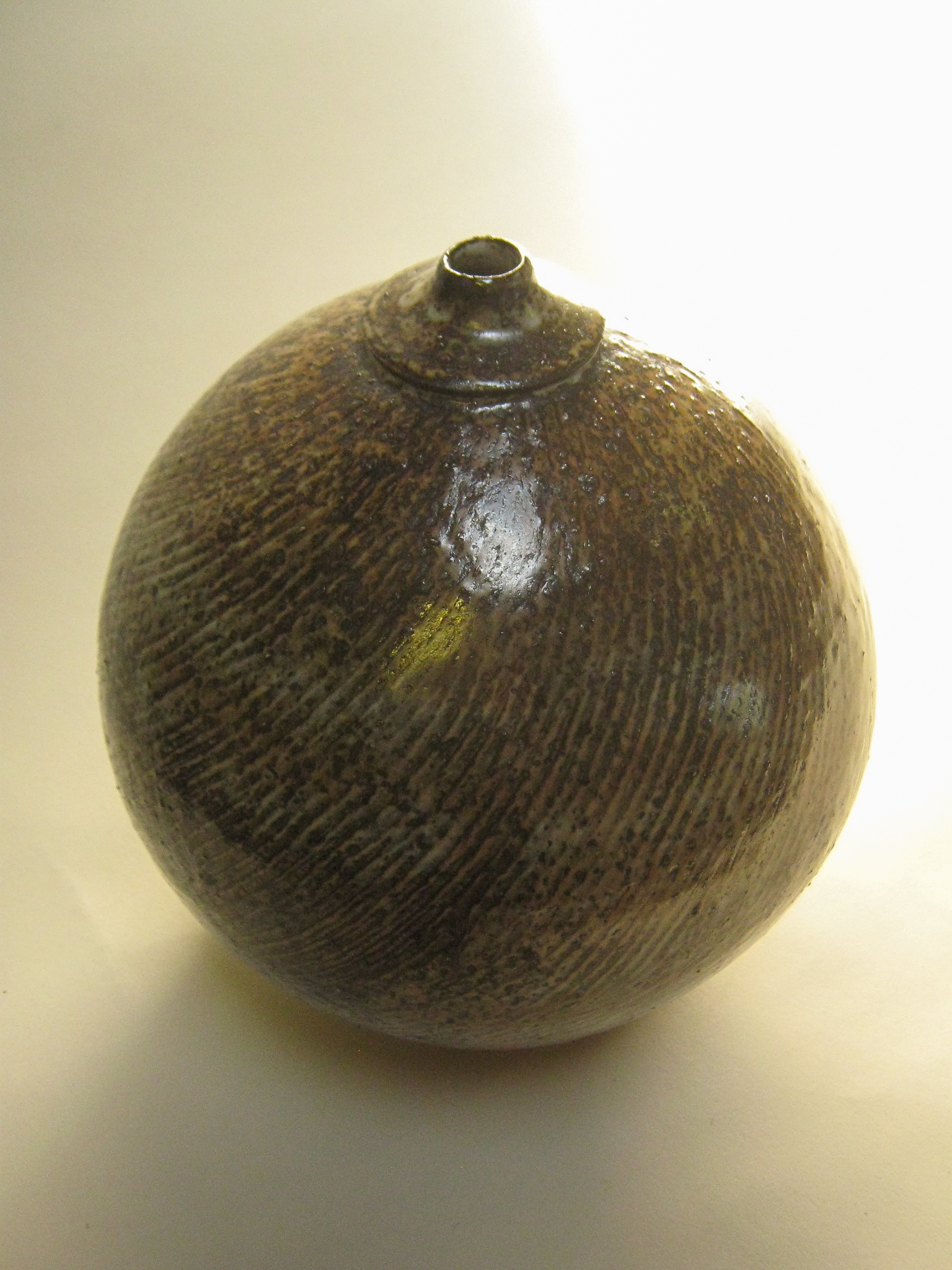
Rope-textured pottery bottle by Tatsuzo Shimaoka formerly in the collection of Ian Sprague; 27cm x 24cm.

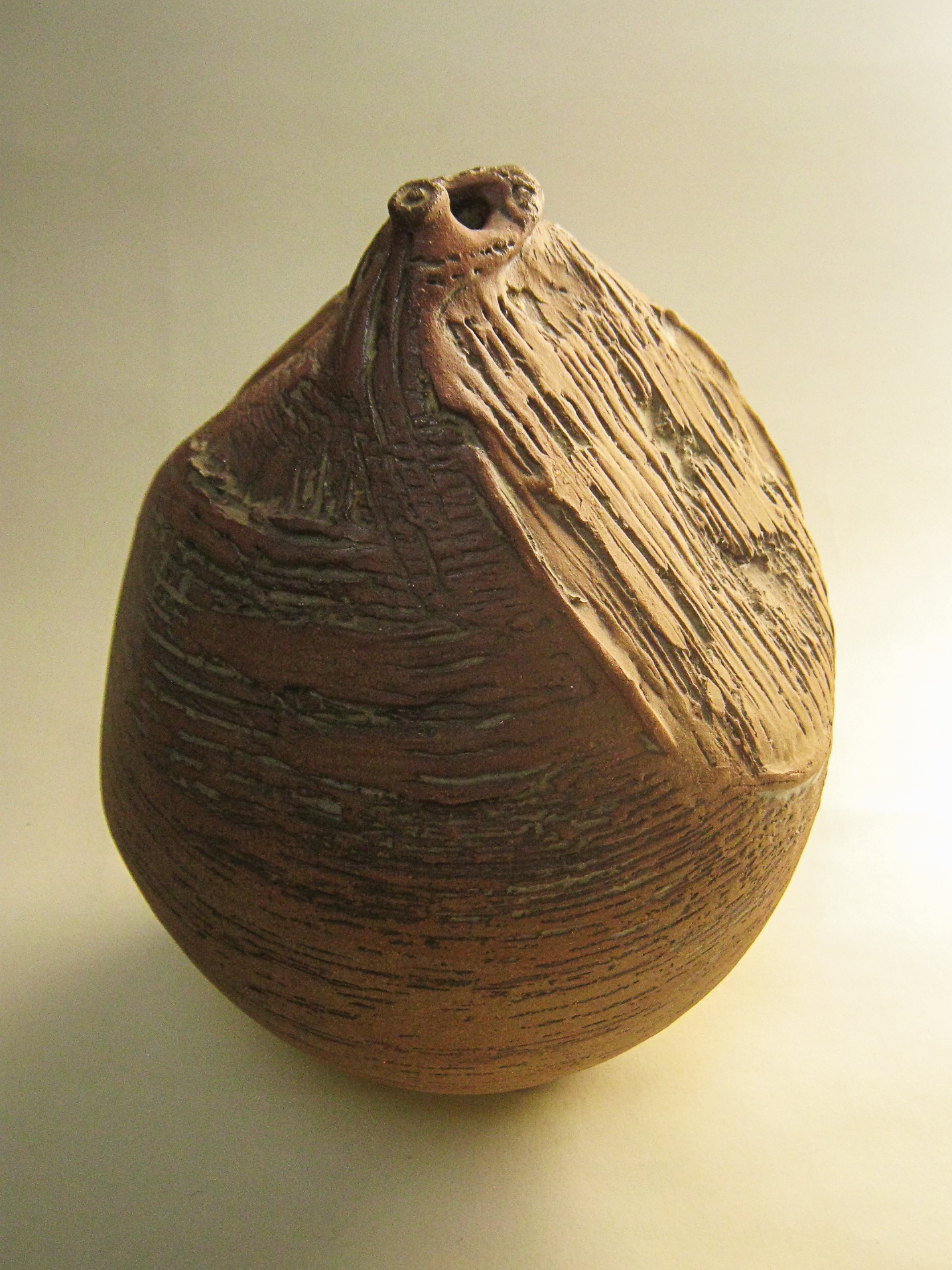
Textured ovoid form in fireclay, 1970s; 33cm x 21cm; Ian Sprague and Mungeribar marks.

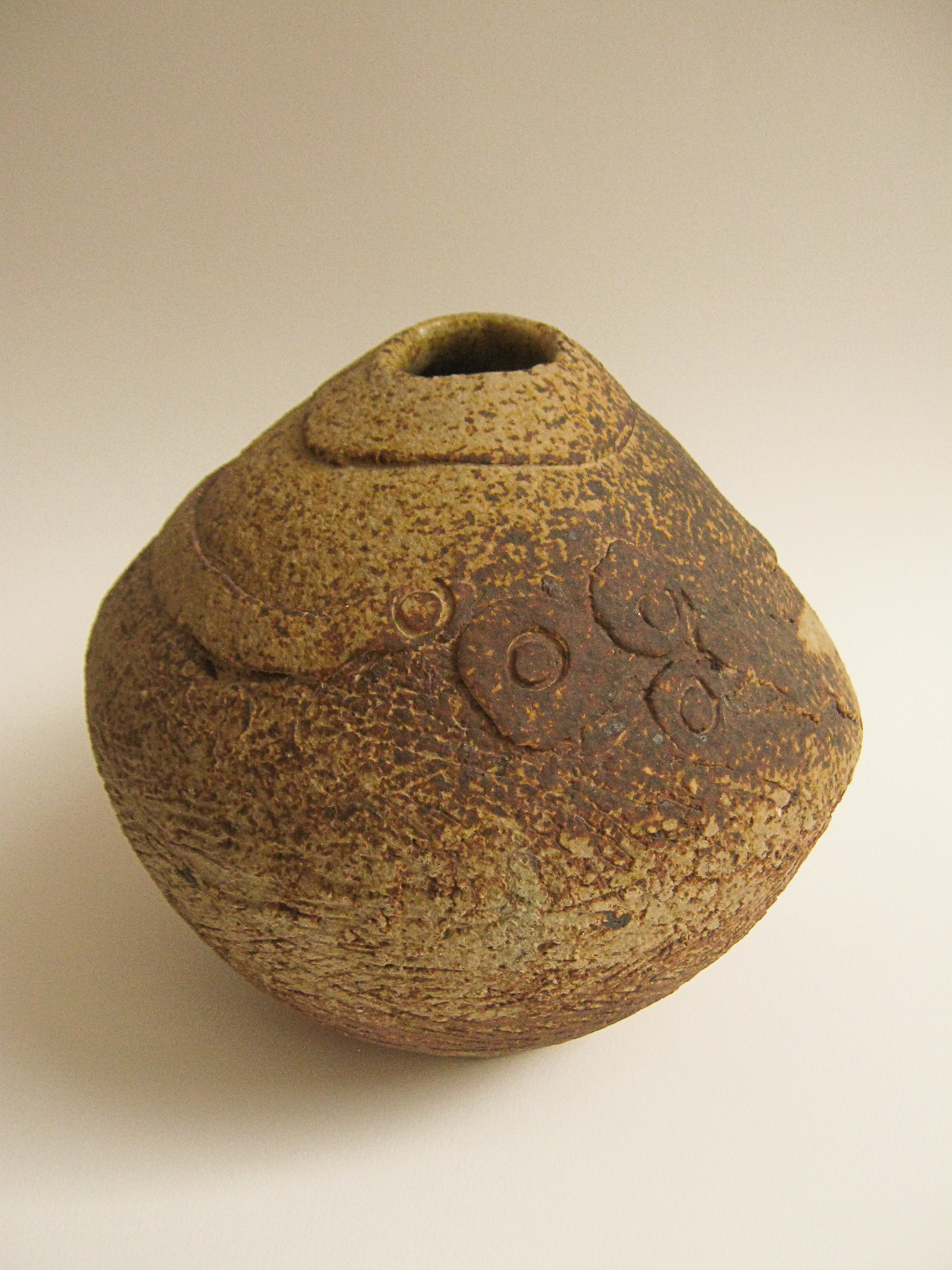
Coiled and beaten ovoid form with a dry glaze and iron oxide; 21cm x 20cm; Ian Sprague and Mungeribar marks.

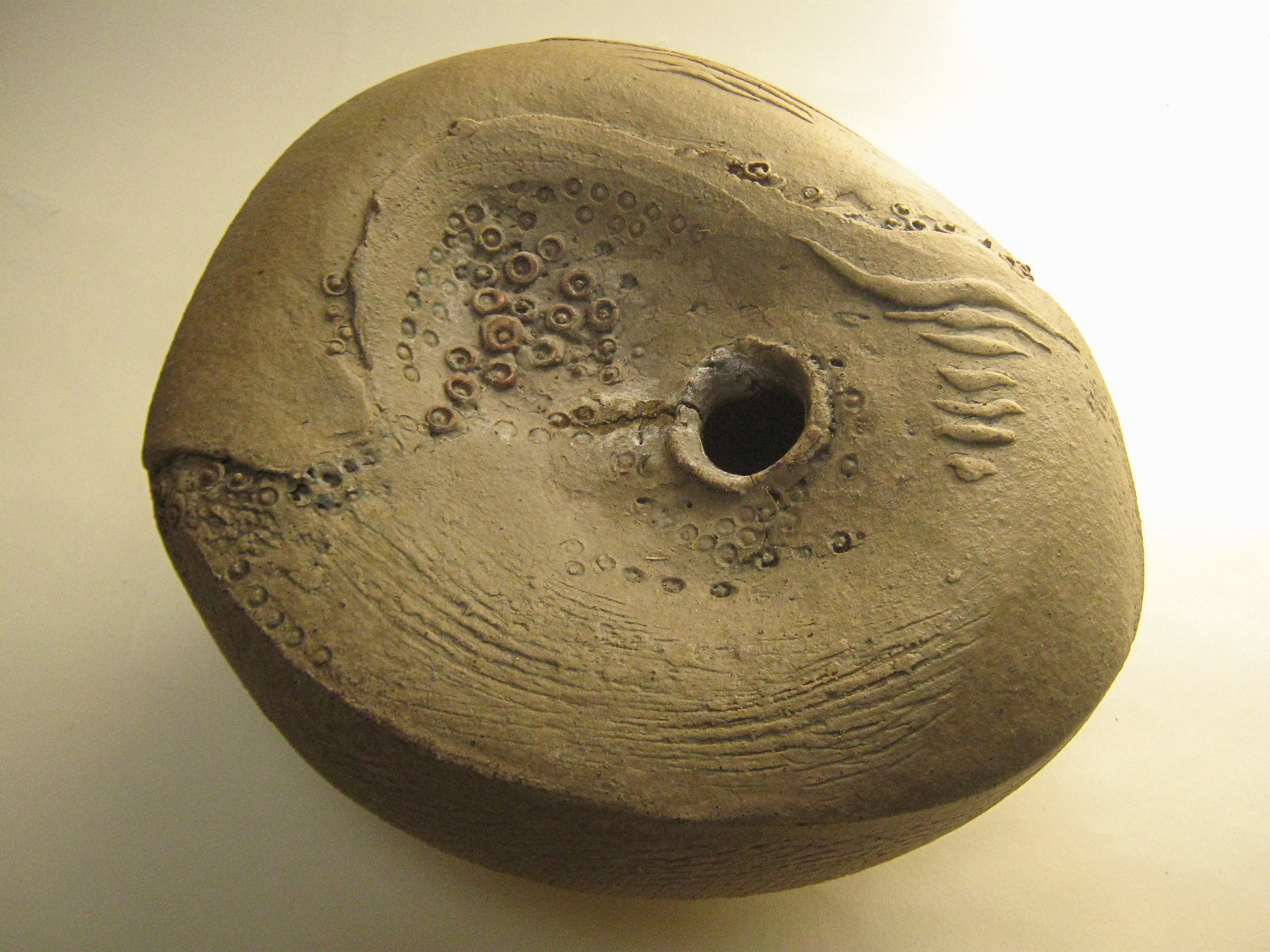
Khaki ovoid form with a dry ash glaze from the late 1970s; 15cm x 32cm; Ian Sprague mark.

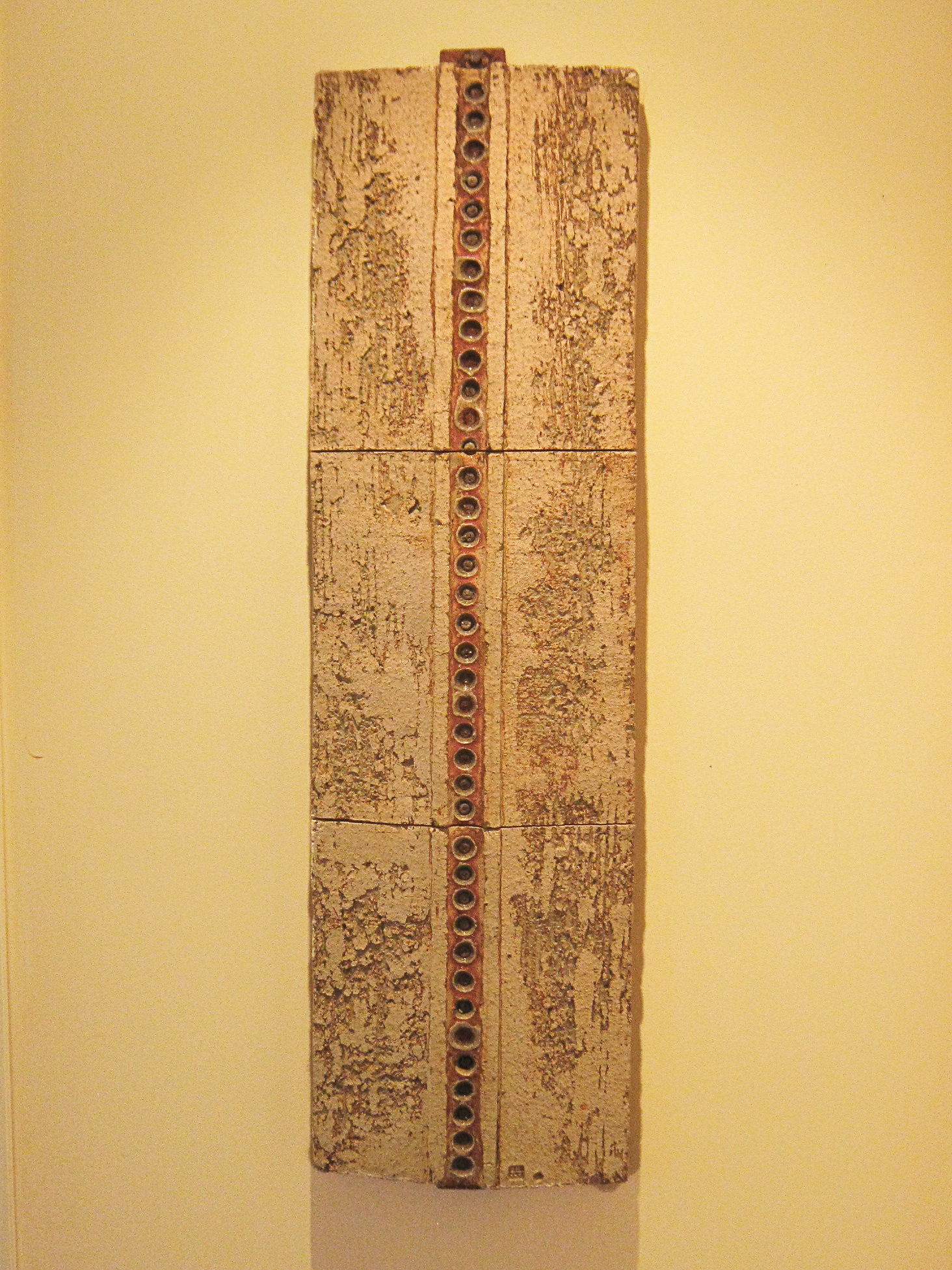
Vertical wall plaque, central design, red-glazed fireclay; 77cm x 23cm; Ian Sprague and Mungeribar marks.

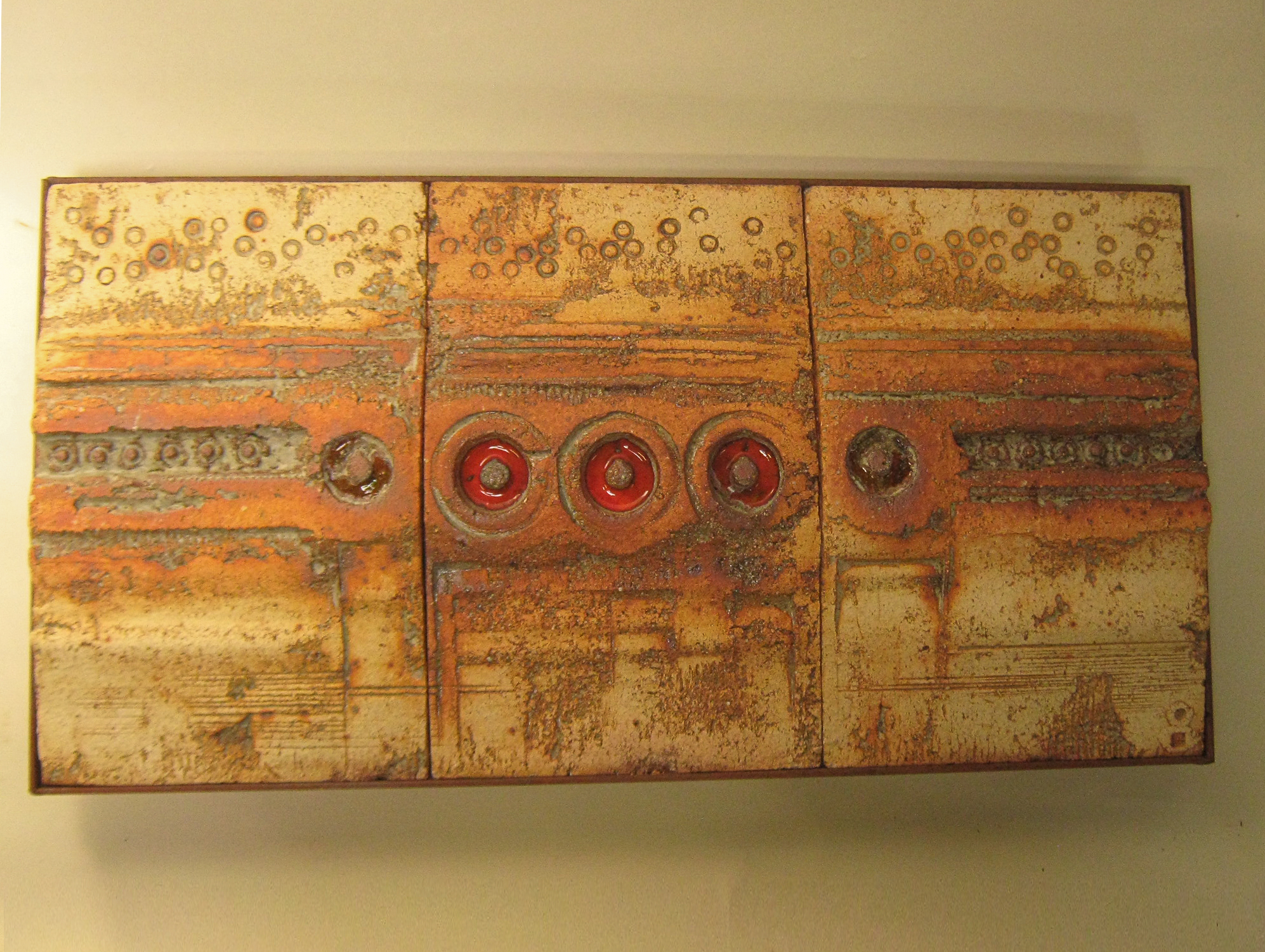
Ian Sprague, fireclay wall plaque in a metal frame, red glass in the mid-level circles; 1970s; 80cm x 40cm; Ian Sprague and Mungeribar marks.

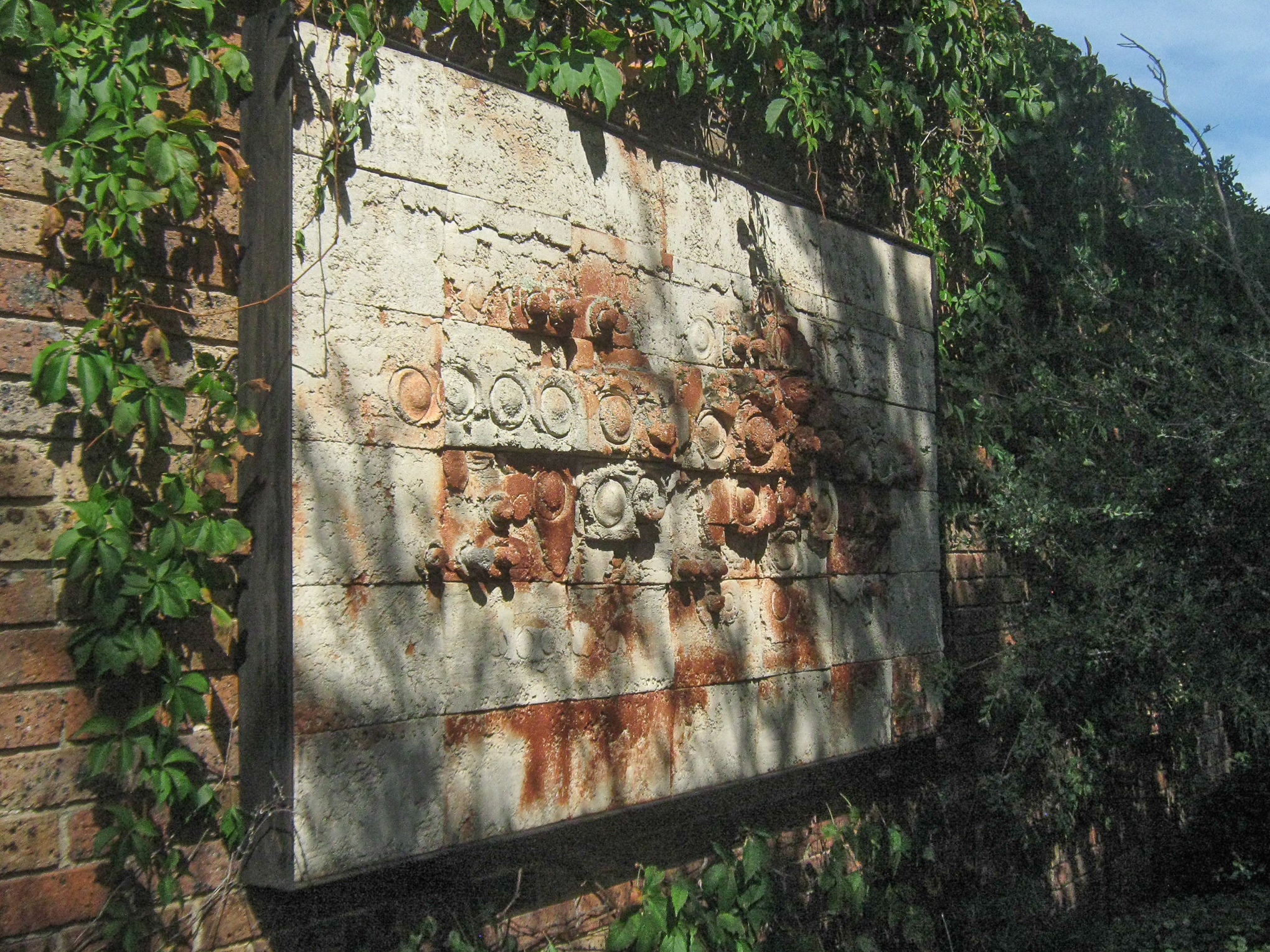
Fireclay wall installation for the Hannan House, Beaumaris; seven panels by six; Ian Sprague mark and signed SPRAGUE 1977.

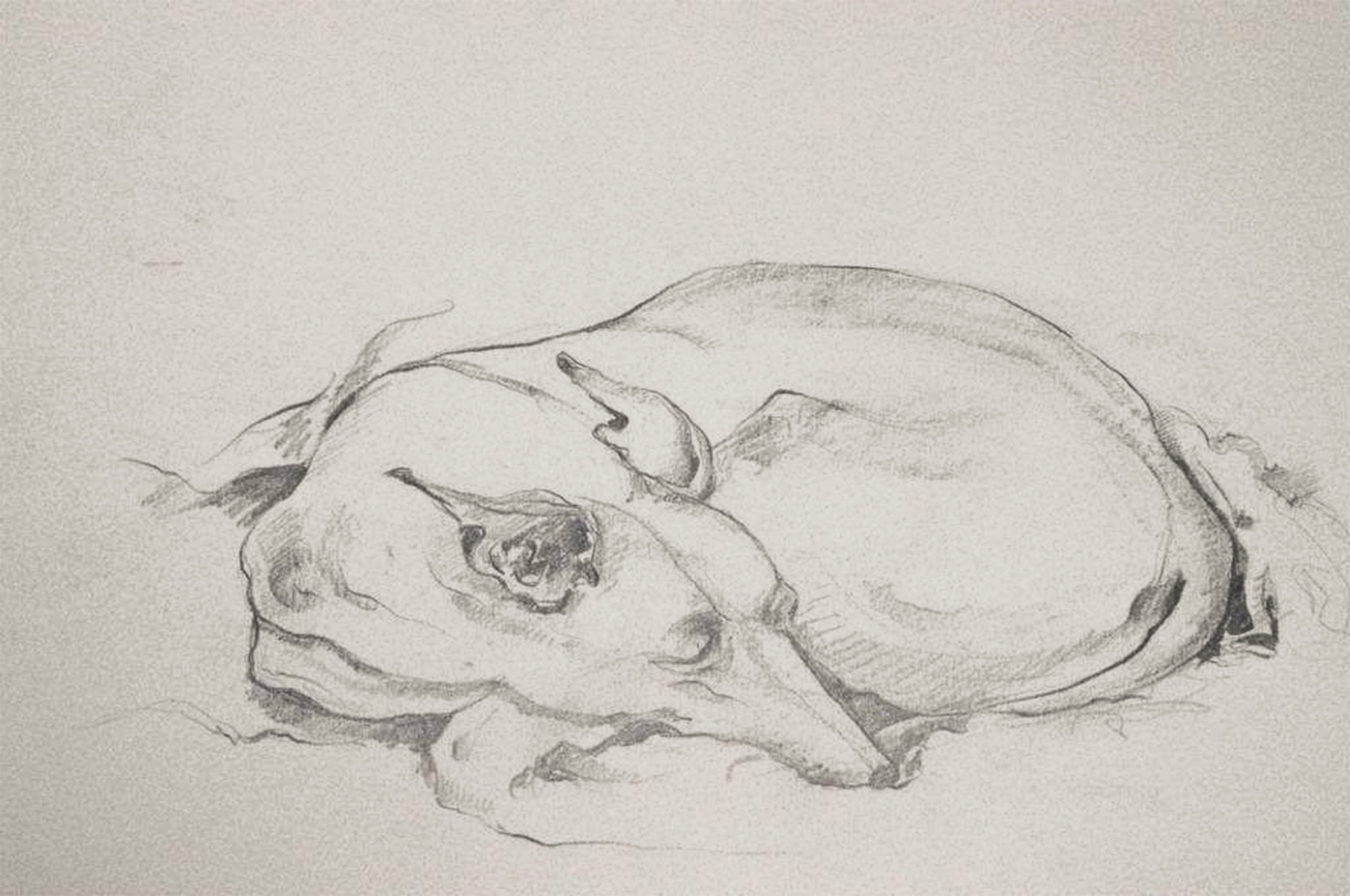
Ian Sprague pencil drawing on rag paper of his whippet Sprint; unsigned and undated.

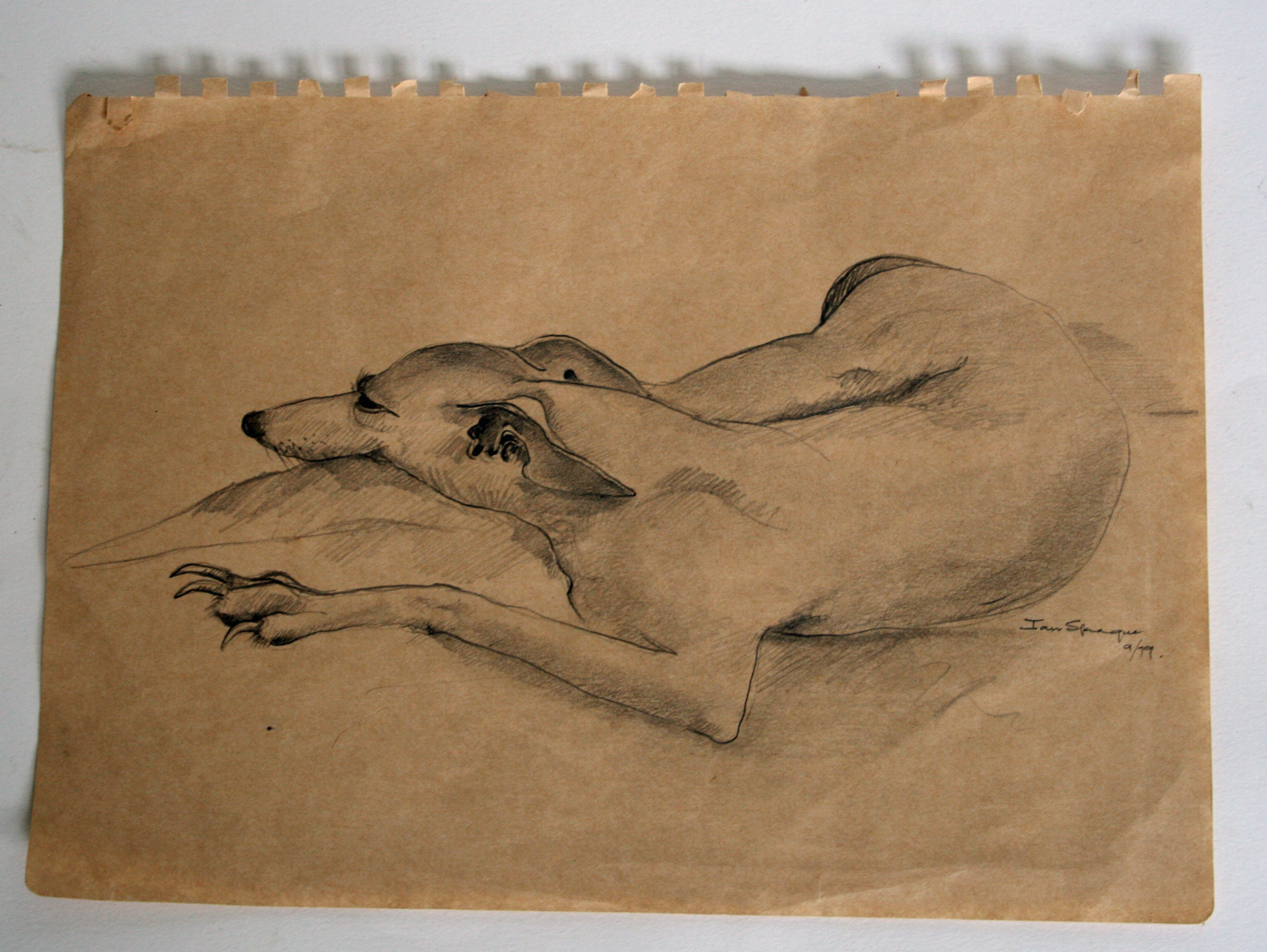
Pencil and ink sketch of Sprint; signed Ian Sprague 9/79.

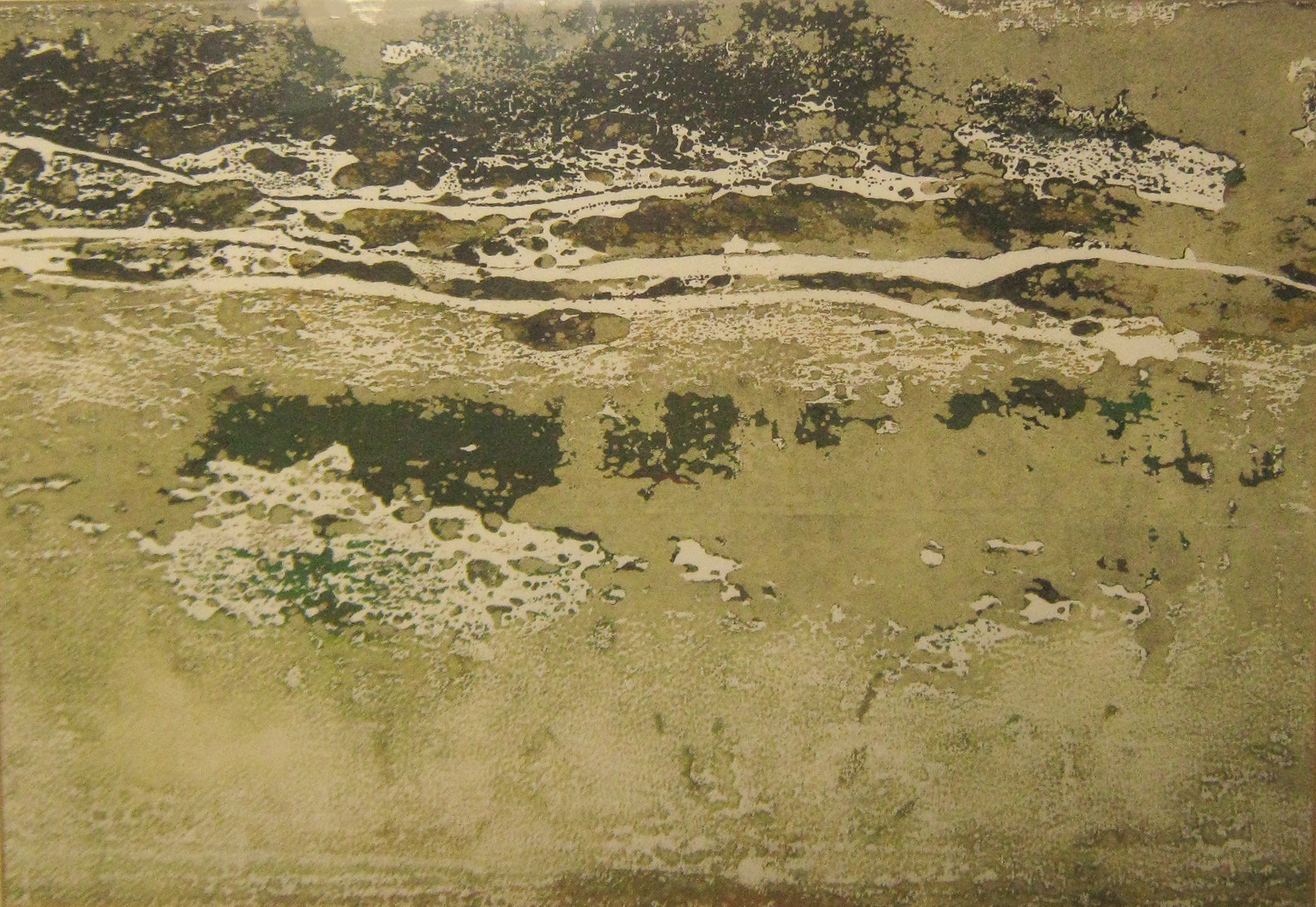
Landscape monoprint on butcher's paper; Ian Sprague 1980s; unsigned.

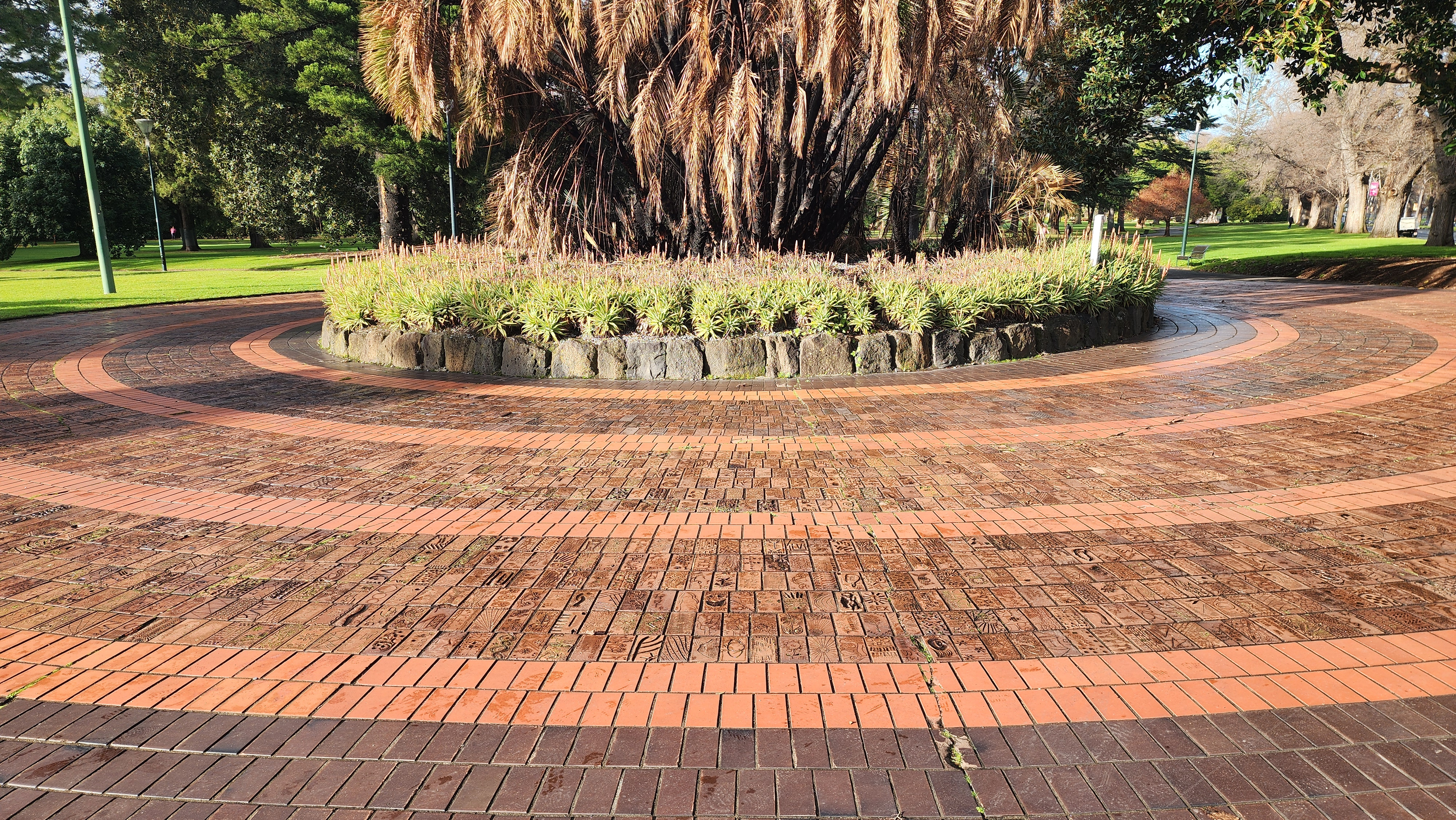
People’s Path

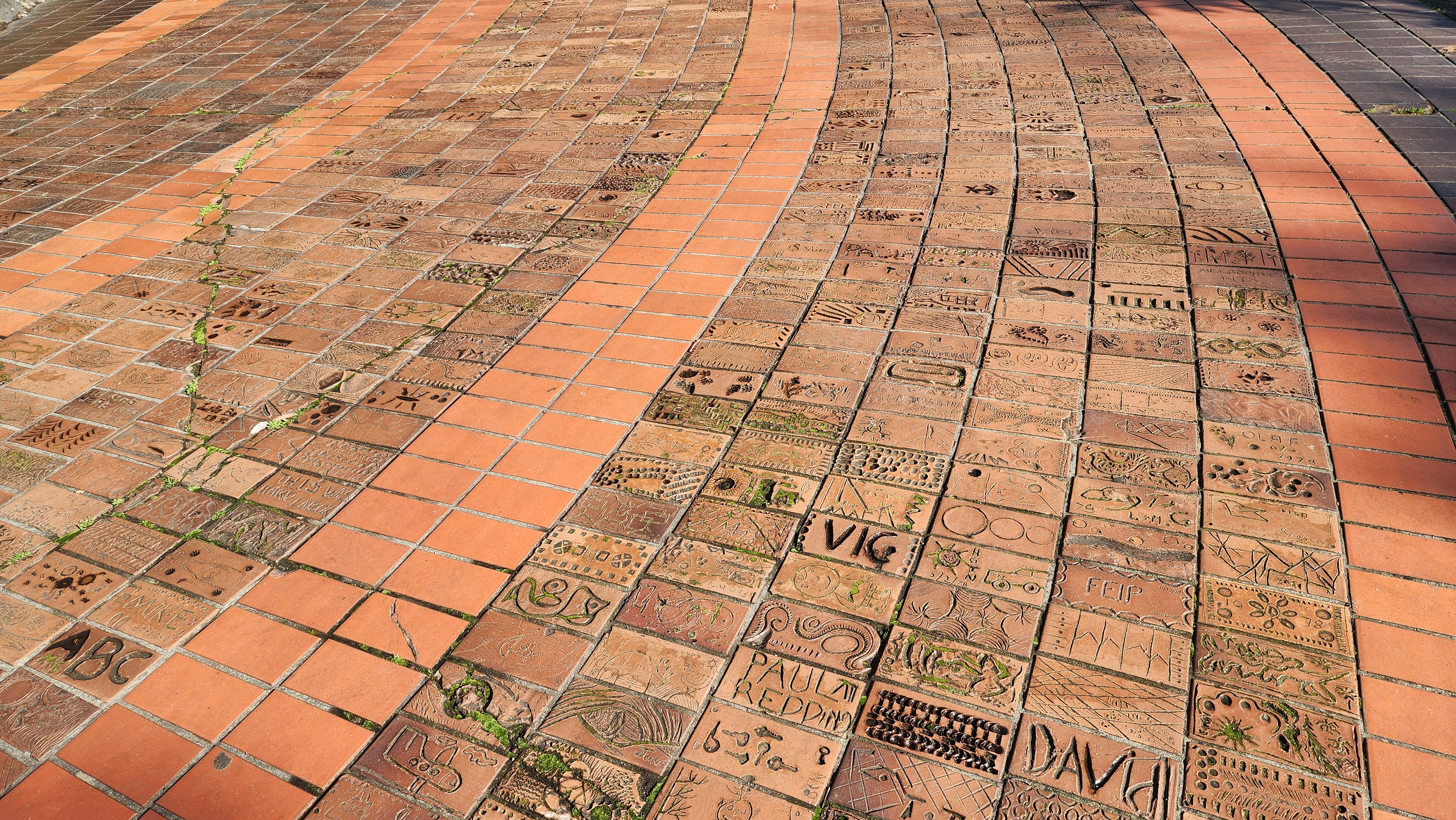
People’s Path (Close-up)

=== 1980s ===
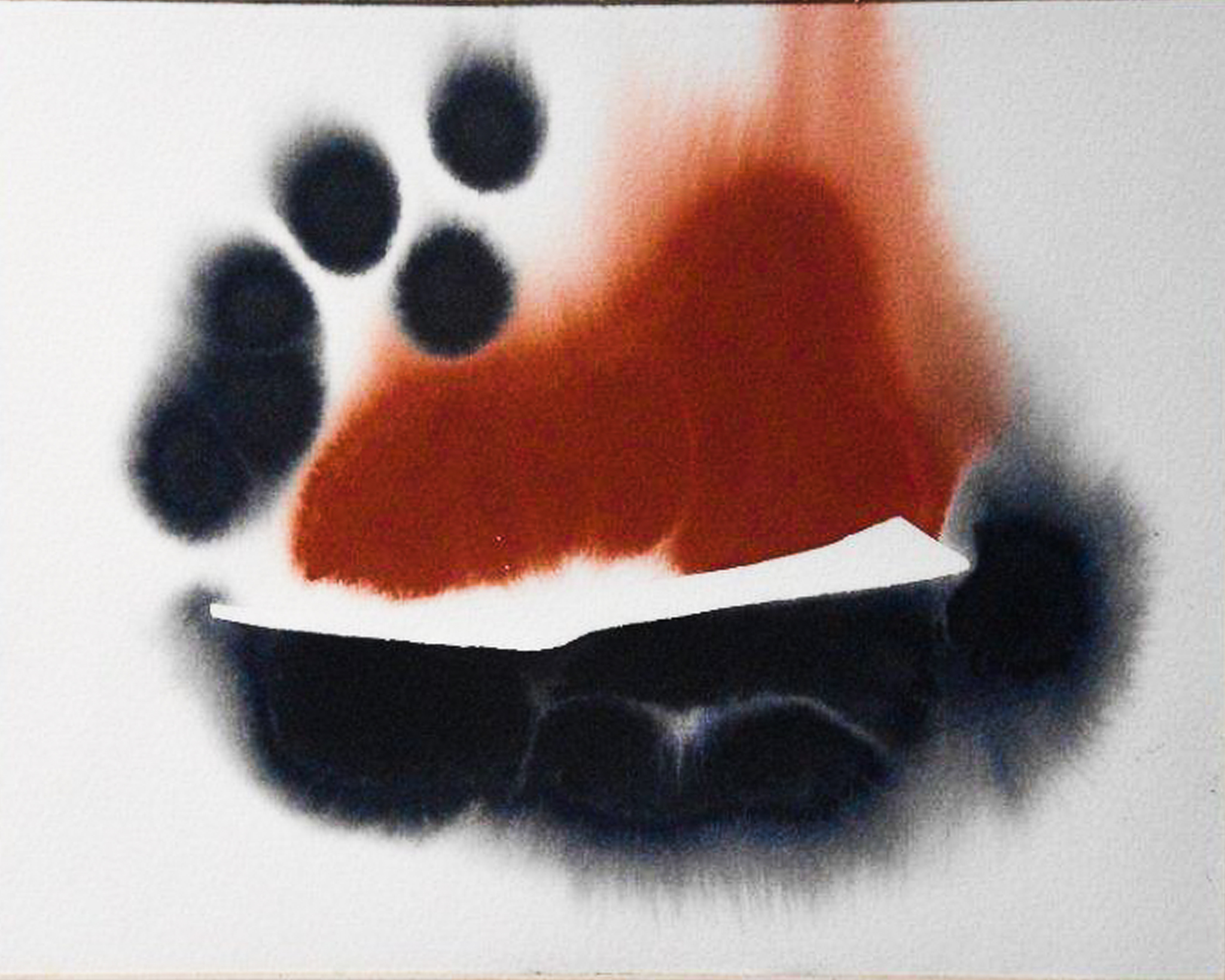
Ian Sprague, orange and indigo pigment on damp paper, 1980s; 165mm x 205mm; unsigned.

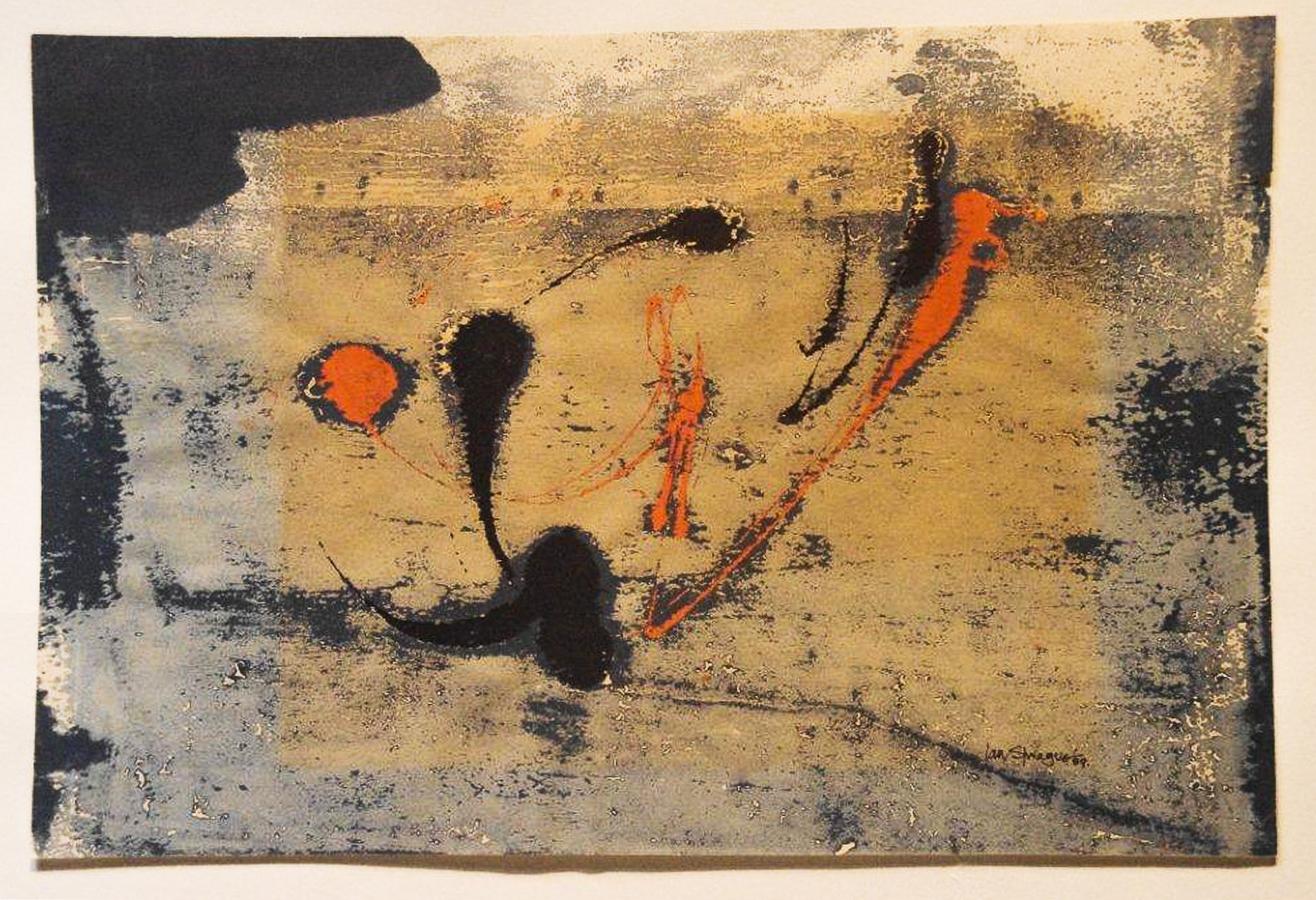
Orange and indigo monoprint; 260mm x 390mm; signed Ian Sprague ’89.

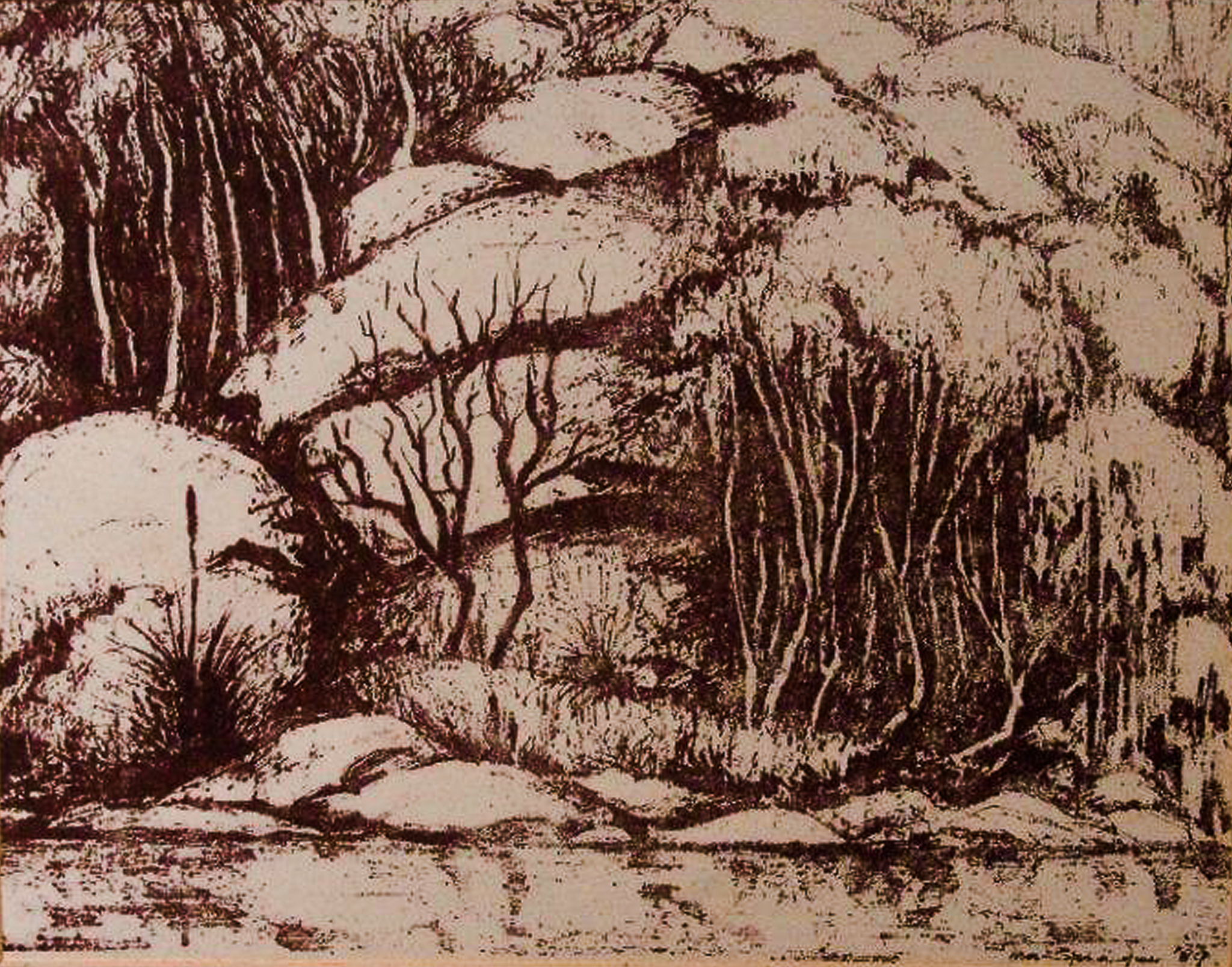
One-off lithograph Hawkesbury Scene; 167mm x 210mm; signed Ian Sprague ’89.

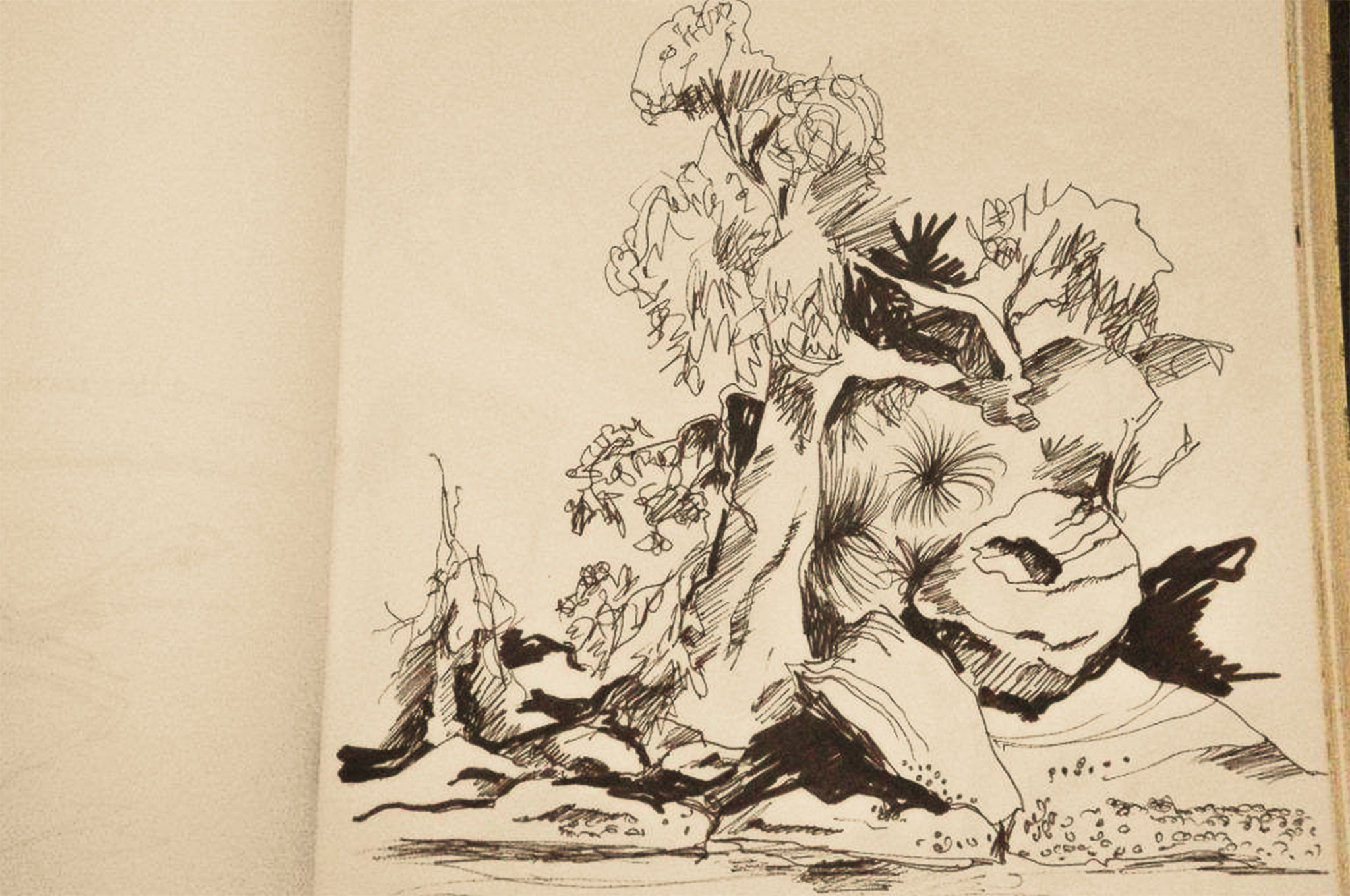
Ian Sprague pen and ink drawing, Hawkesbury River 1980s; unsigned and undated sketchbook page.

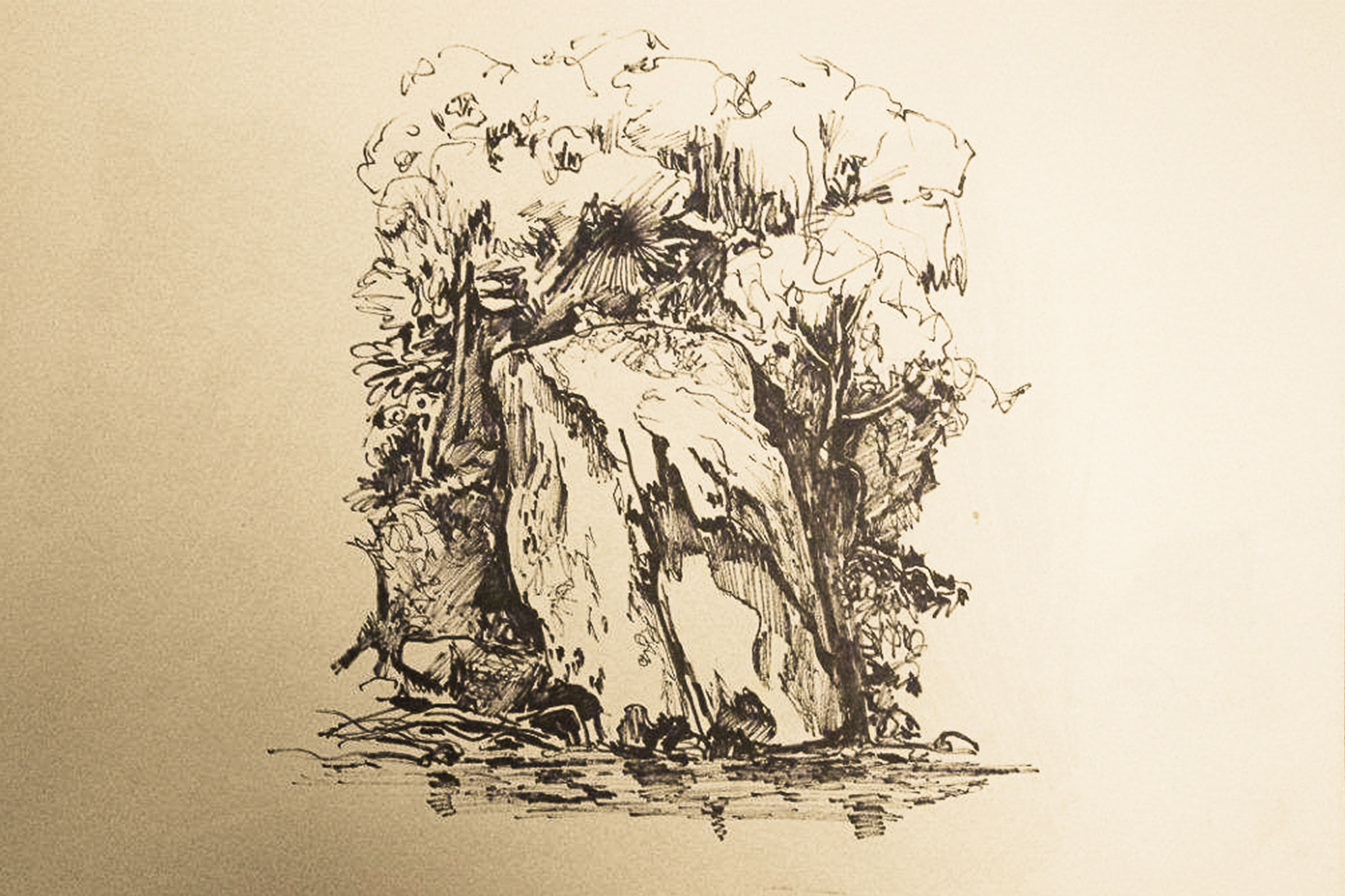
Ian Sprague pen and ink drawing, Hawkesbury River 1980s; 27cm x 35cm; unsigned and undated sketchbook page.

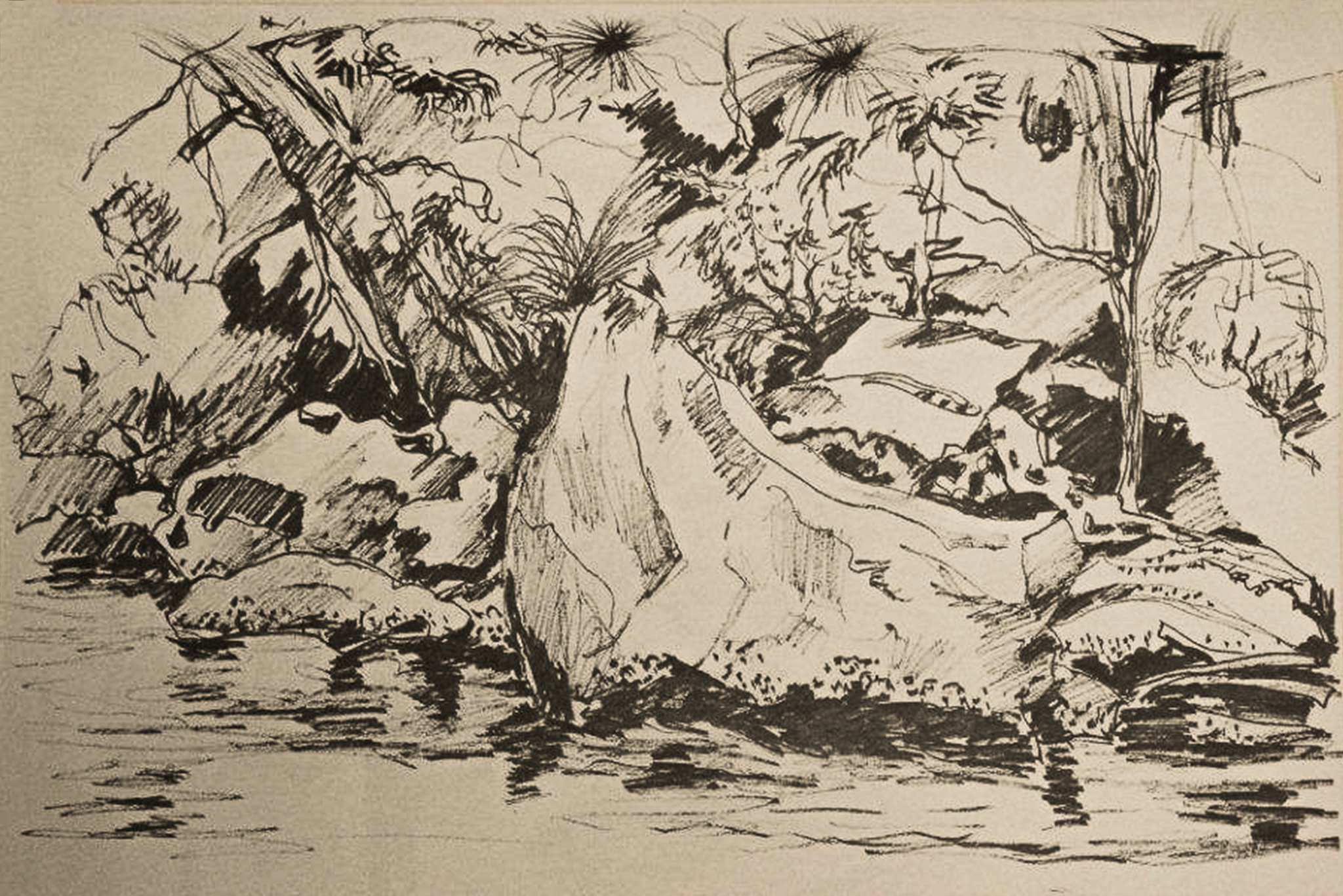
Ian Sprague pen and ink drawing, Hawkesbury River 1980s; 27cm x 35cm; unsigned and undated sketchbook page.

=== 1990s ===
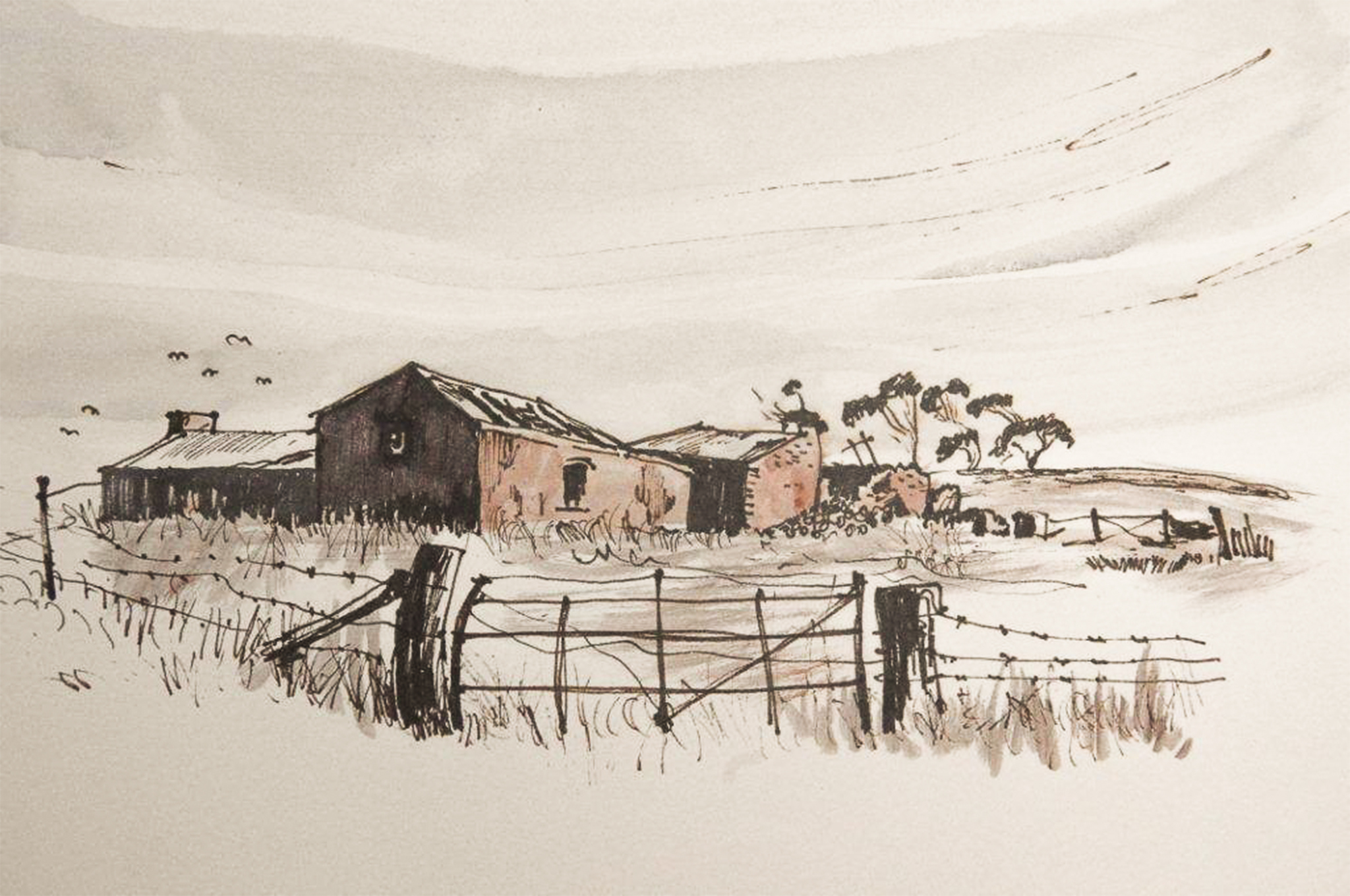
Ian Sprague landscape with pen, ink and brown wash; unsigned and undated. Probably done near the Flinders Ranges, South Australia, 1992.

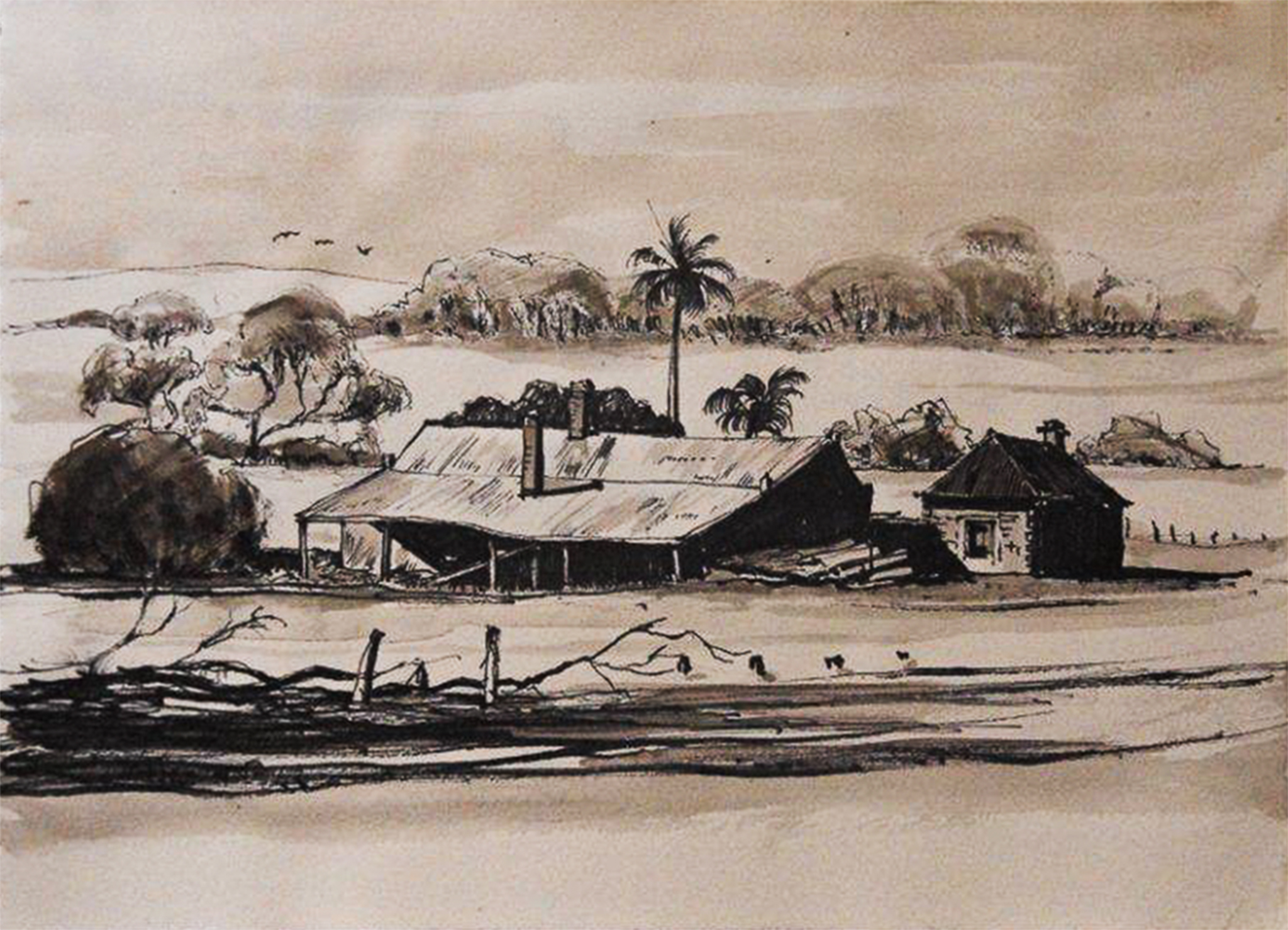
Ian Sprague sketchbook landscape in pen, ink and wash; unsigned and undated.

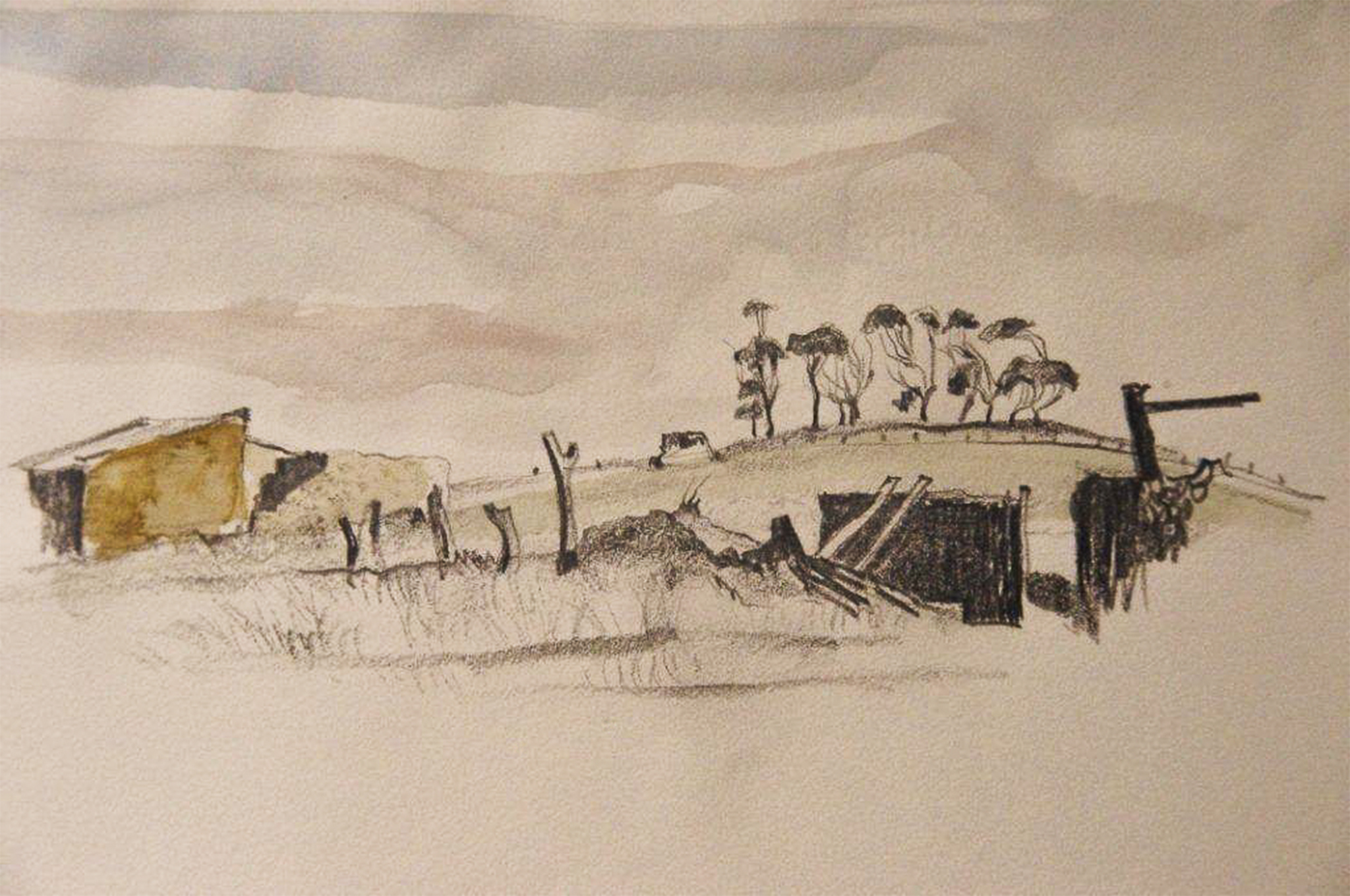
Ian Sprague landscape with pencil and washes on rag paper; unsigned and undated. Probably done near the Flinders Ranges, 1992.

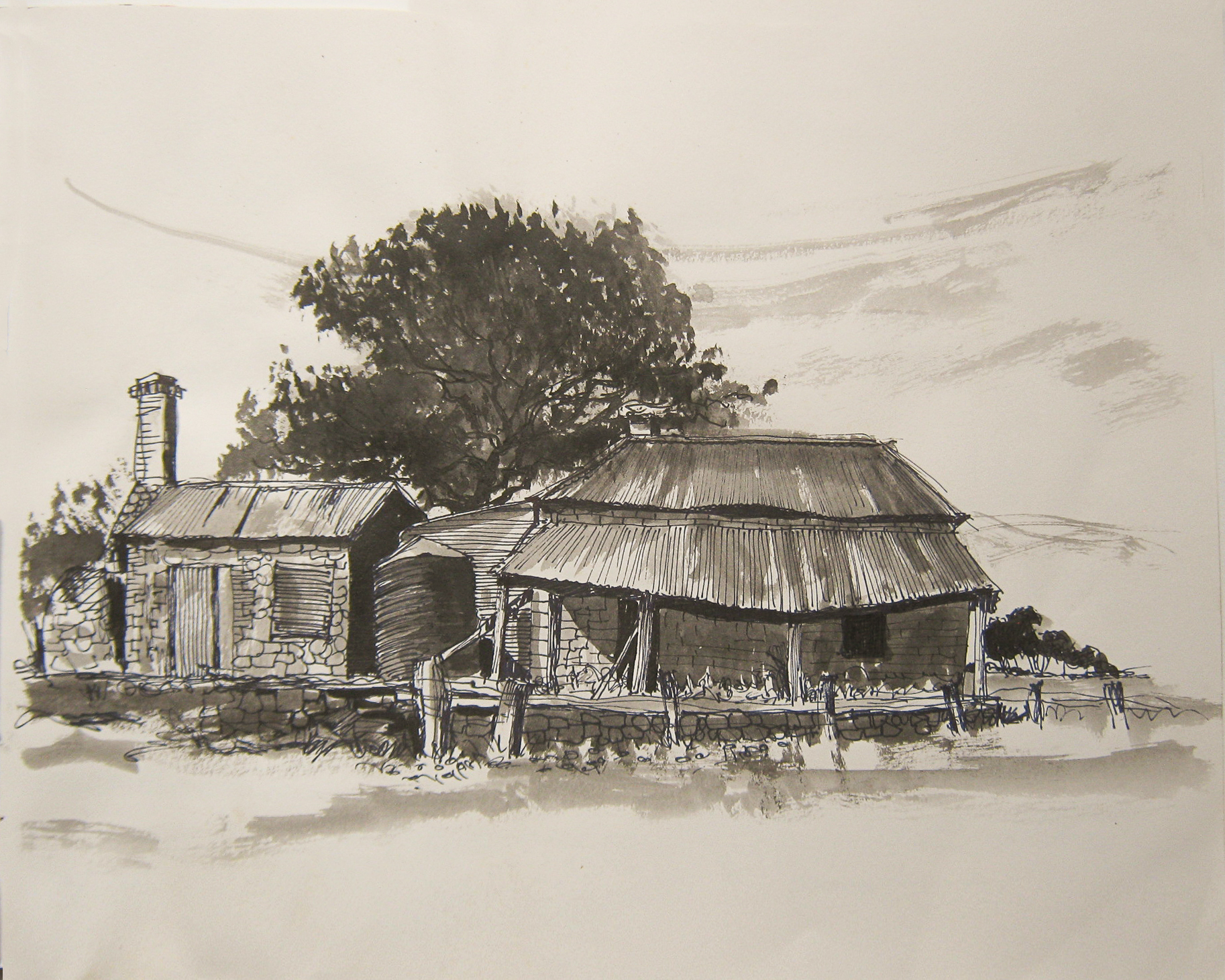
Ink and wash drawing of a cottage at Marananga, Barossa Valley, 1992; 27cm x 35cm; unsigned and undated.

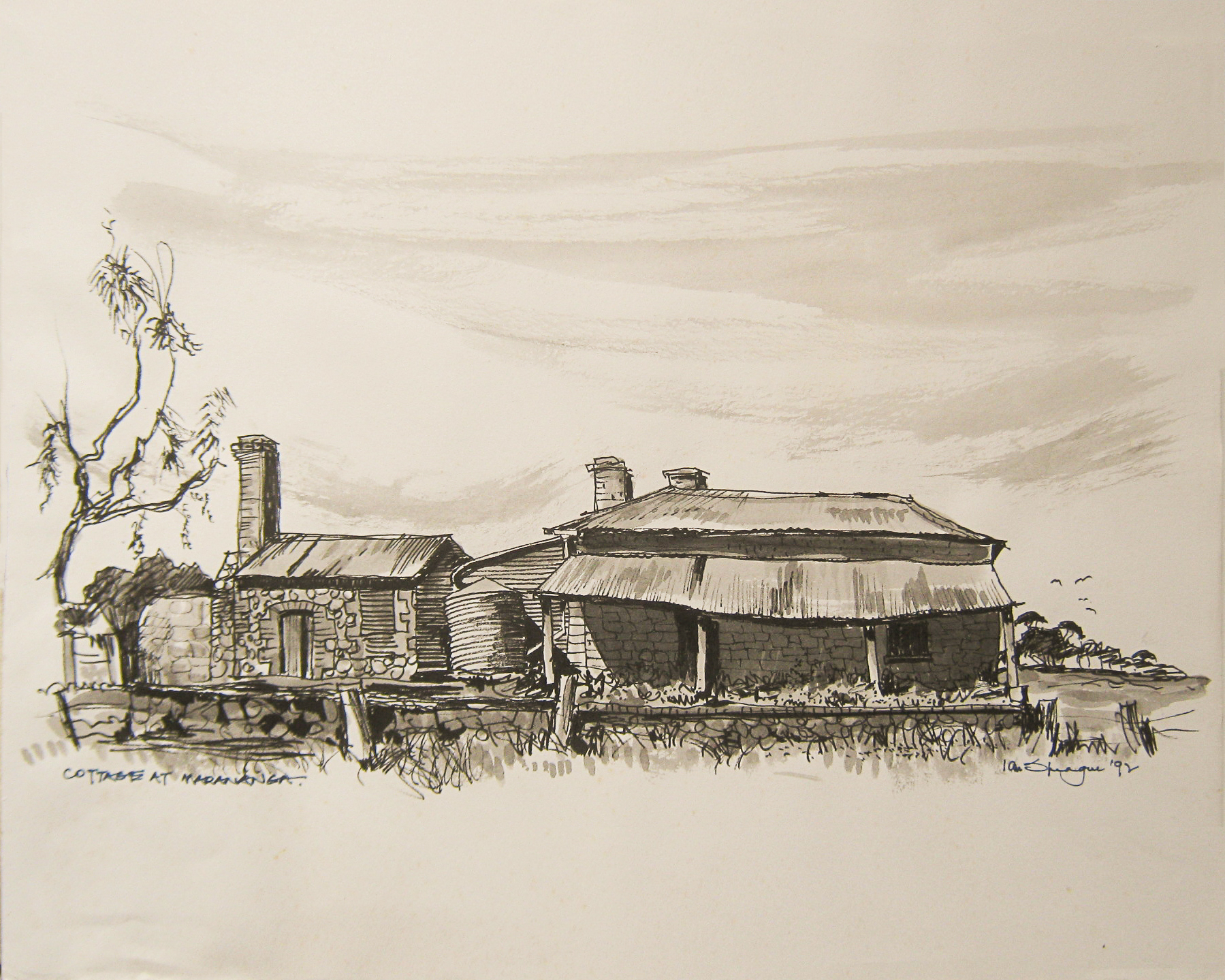
Ink and wash drawing of the same cottage shown previously, Barossa Valley 1992; 27cm x 35cm; titled Cottage at Marananga, Ian Sprague '92.

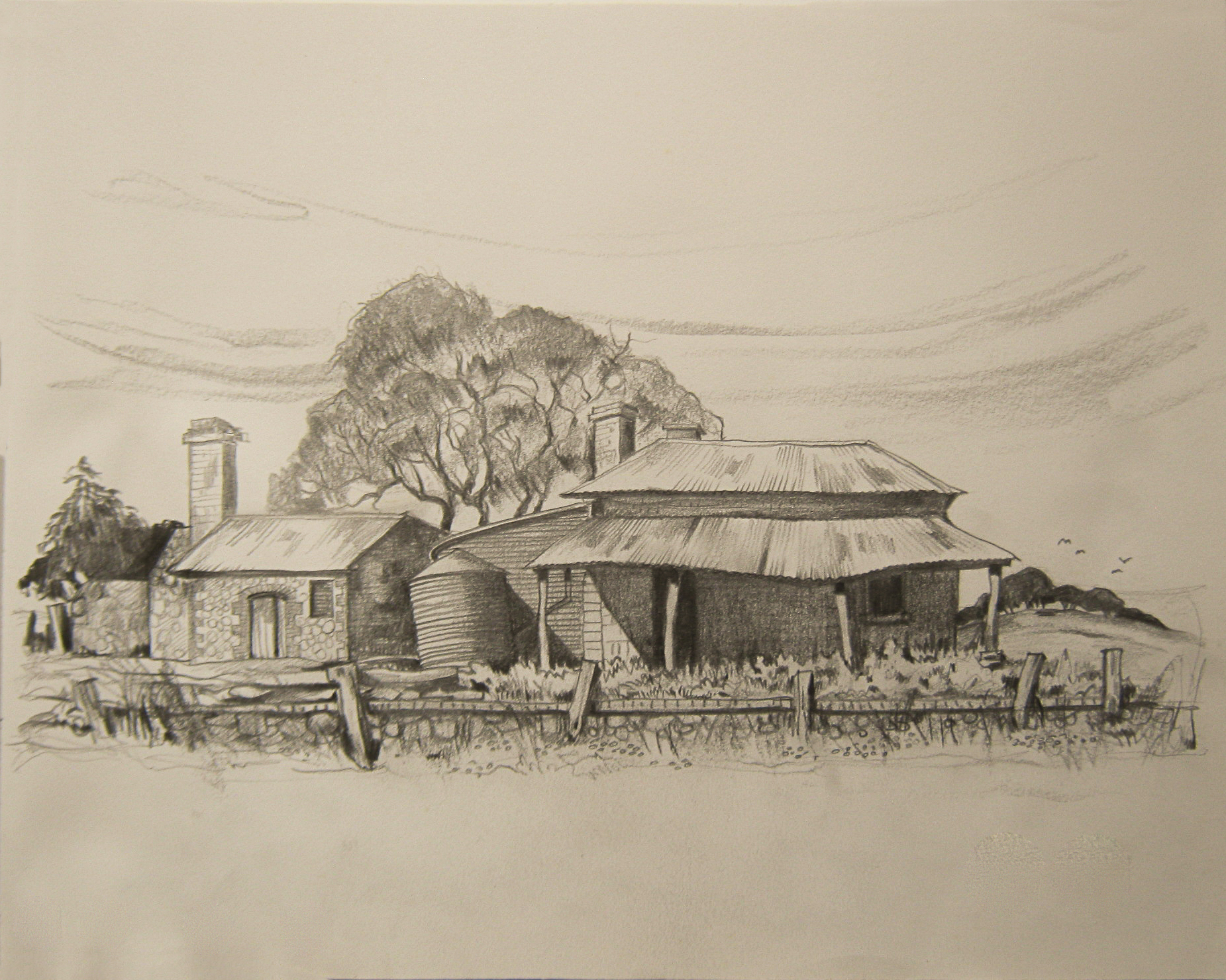
Pencil drawing of the same cottage at Marananga, 1992; 27cm x 35cm; unsigned and undated.

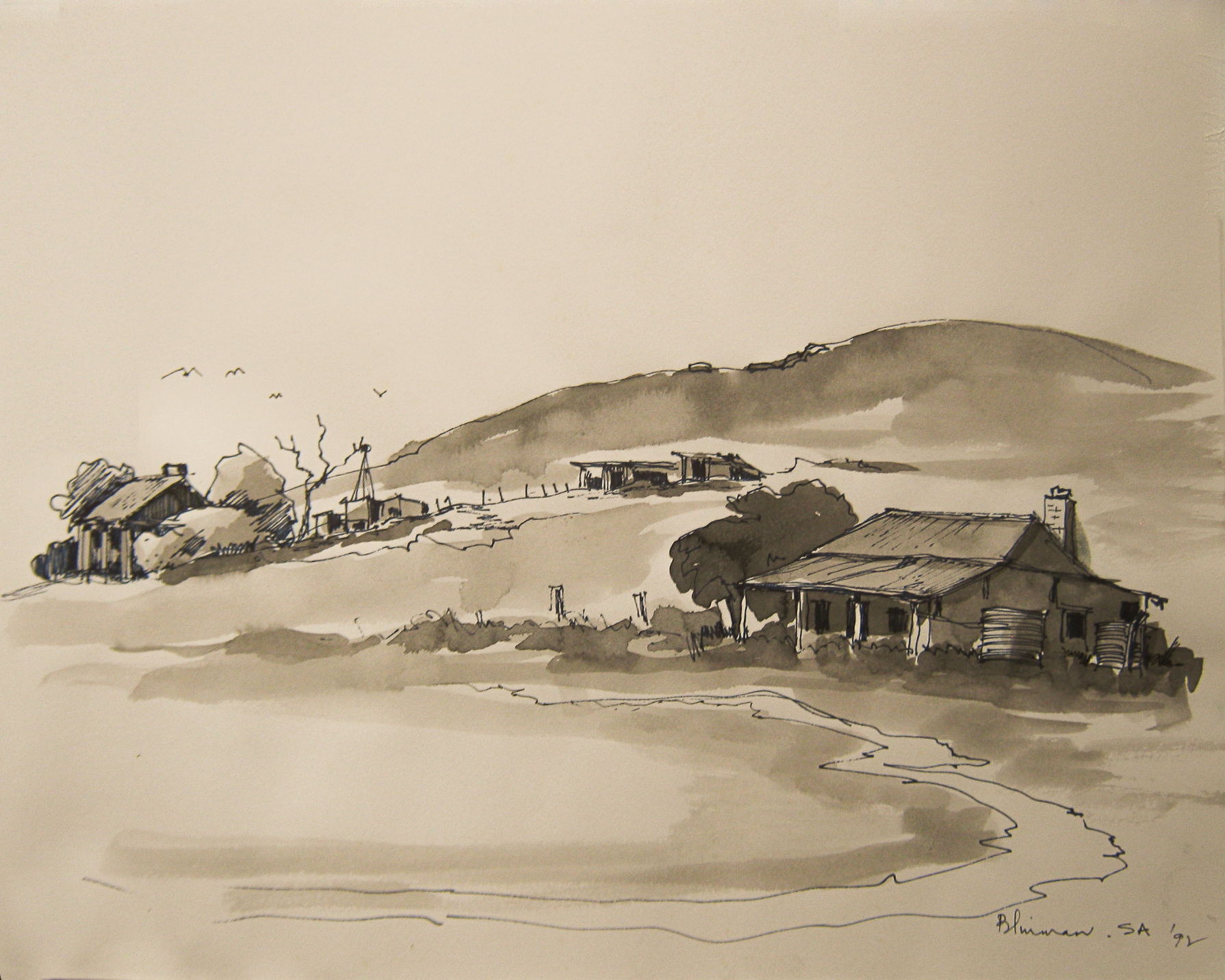
Ink and wash drawing made at Blinman, South Australia; 27cm x 35cm; titled Blinman SA '92.

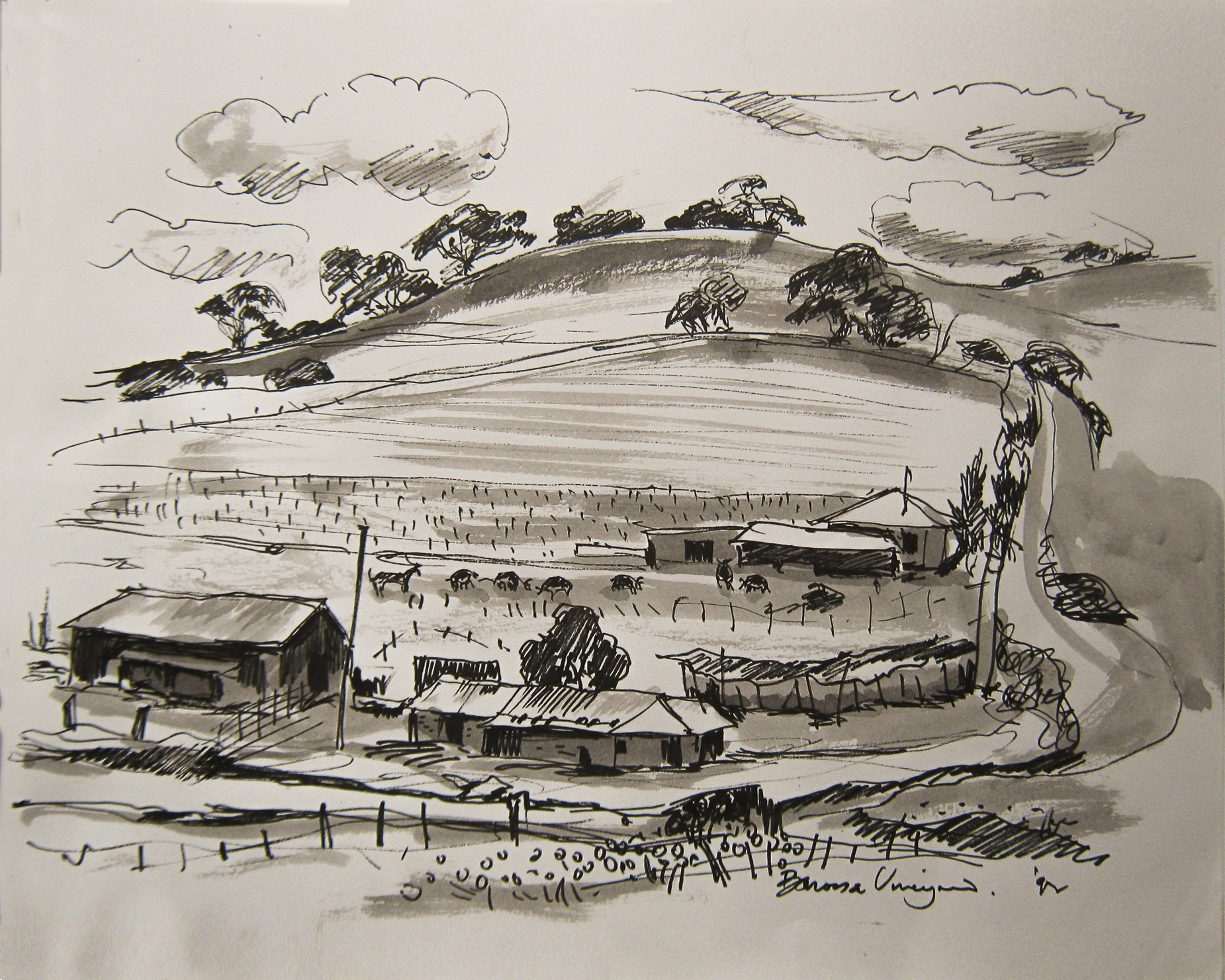
Ink and wash drawing, Barossa Valley, 1992; 27cm x 35cm; unsigned, titled Barossa Vineyard '92.

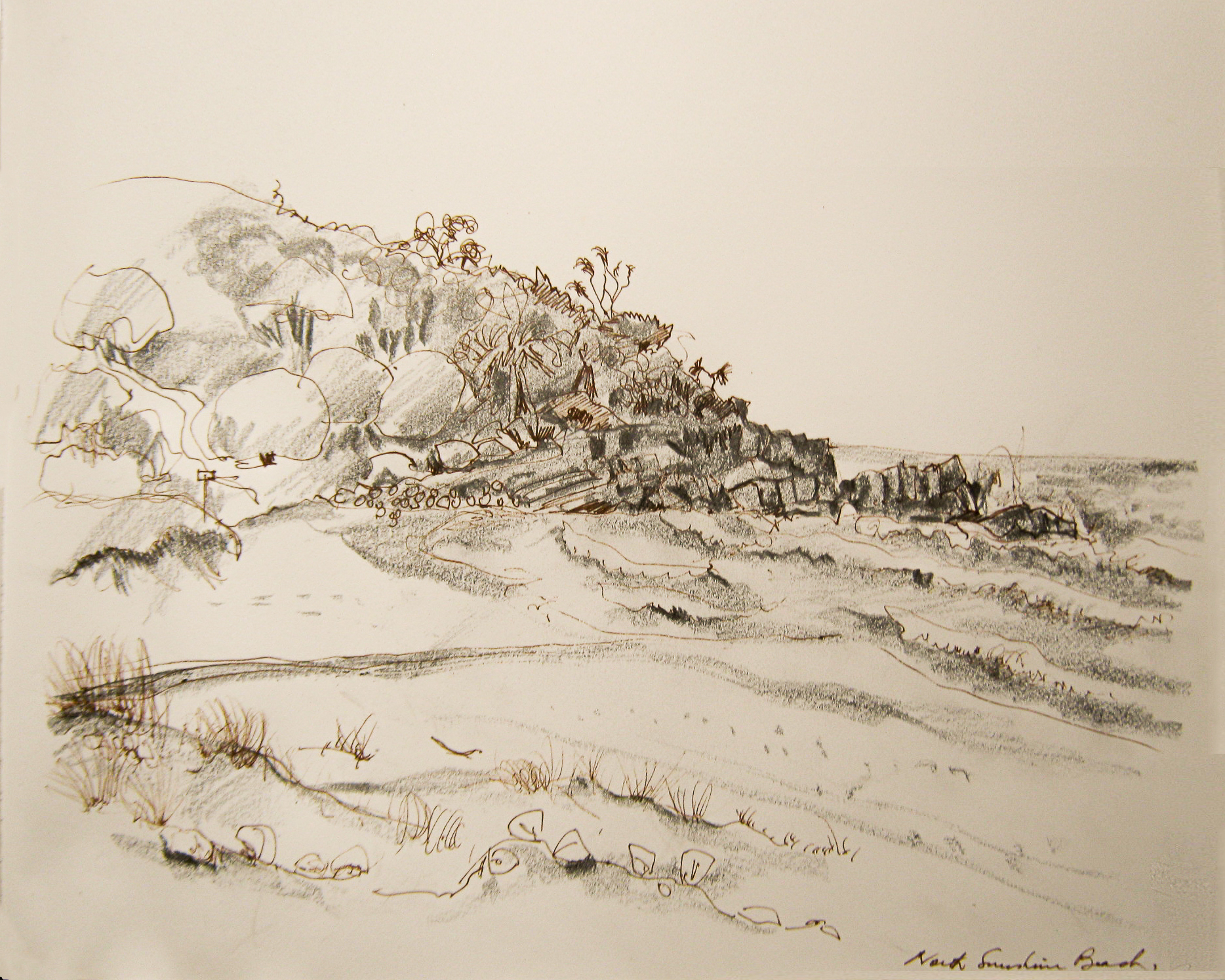
Brown ink and black crayon drawing, 1992; 27cm x 35cm; titled North Sunshine Beach.
