= Mashiko ware =

Type of Japanese pottery

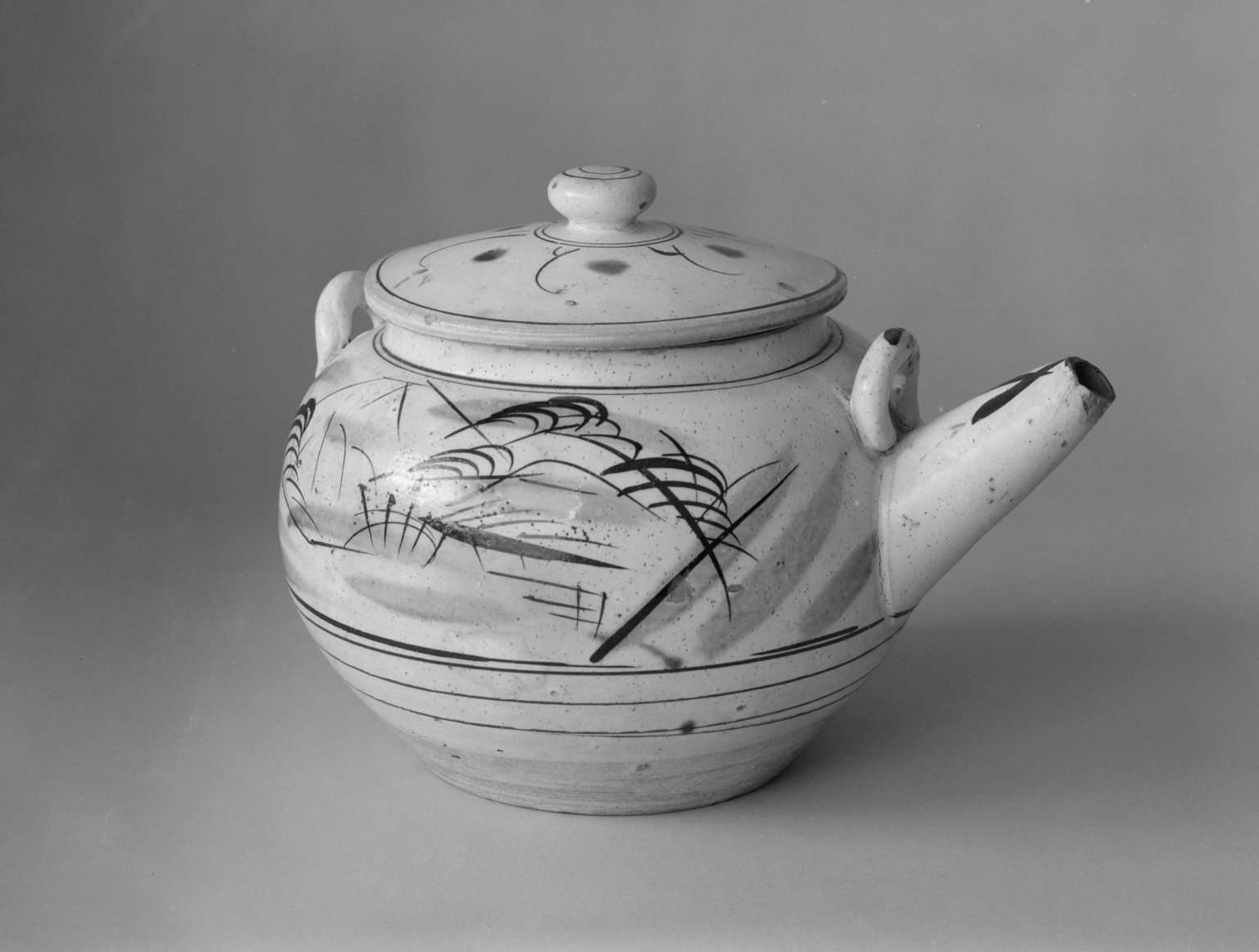
Ko-Mashiko stoneware teapot mado-e dobin ("Window Picture"), ca. 1915–35, Taisho/Showa era

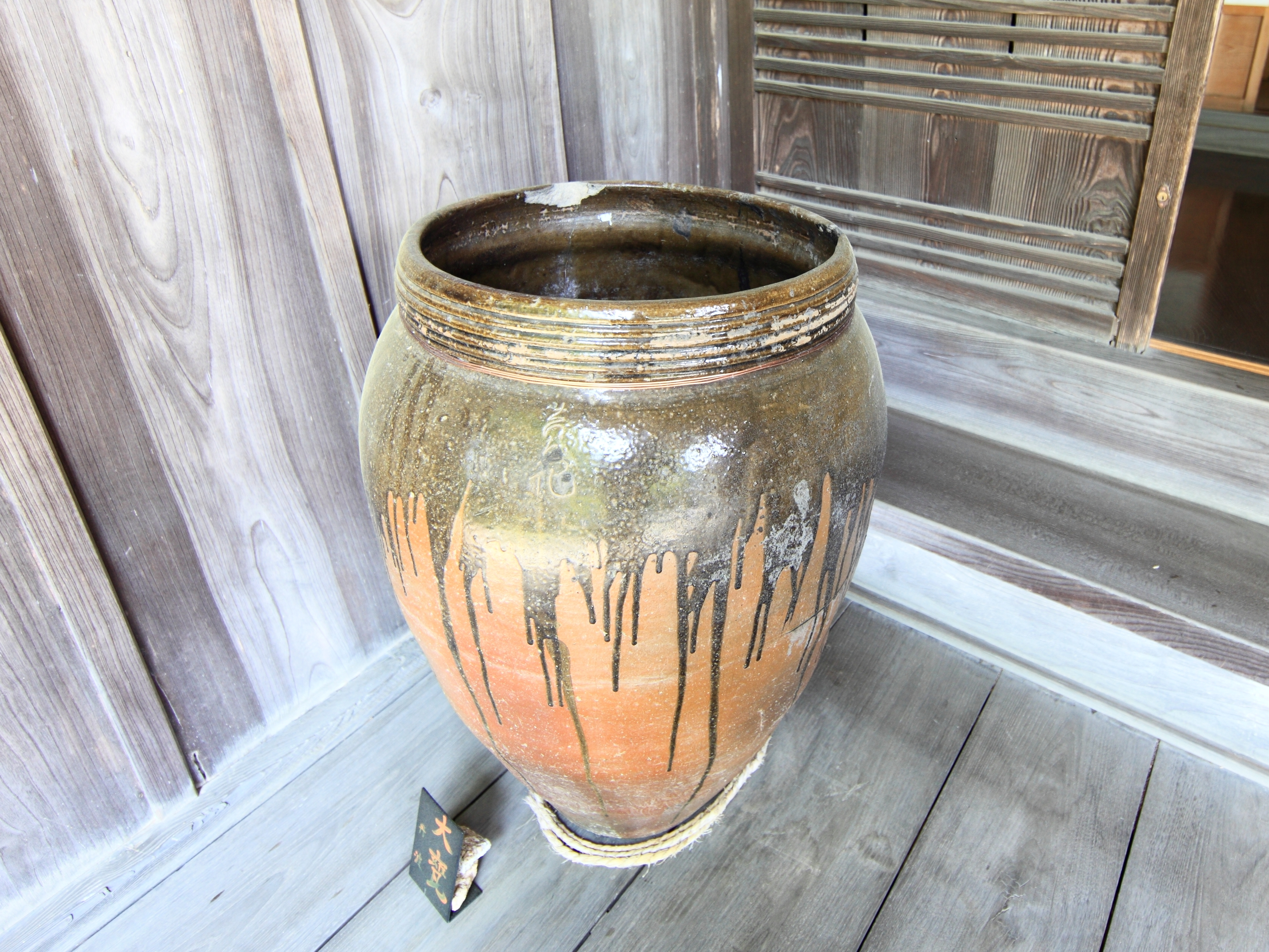
Large traditional Mashiko ware jar

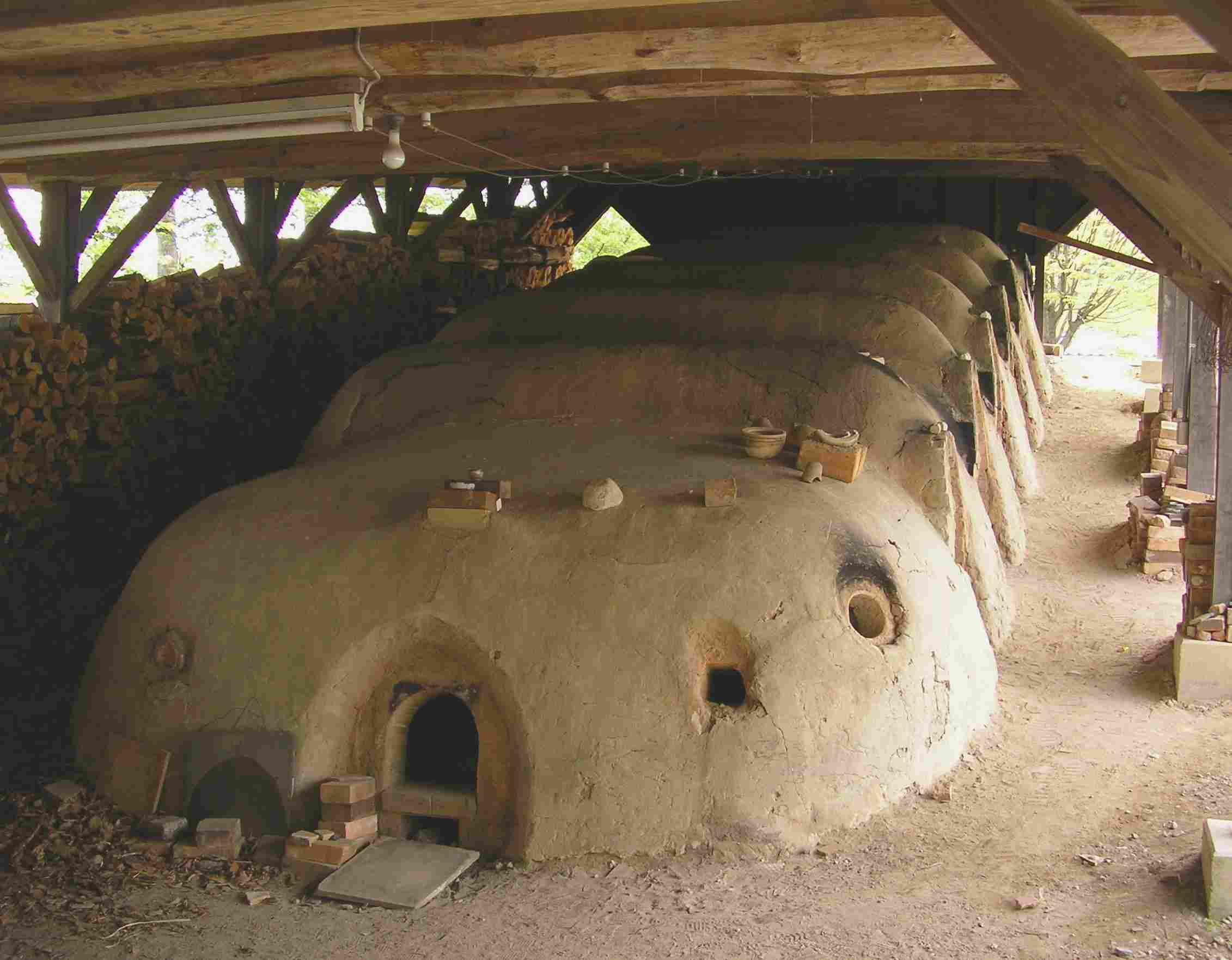
Noborigama (climbing kiln) in Mashiko

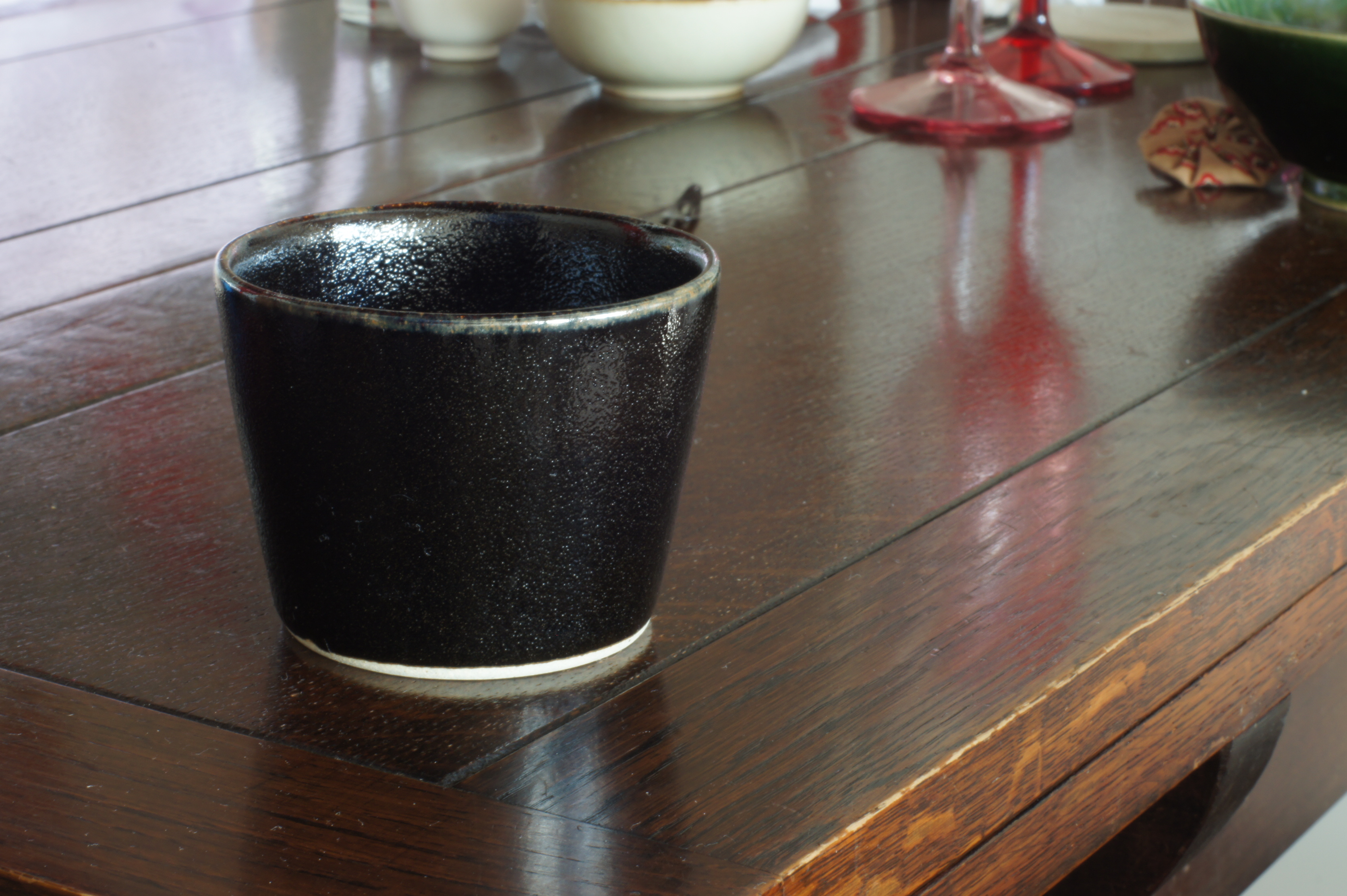
Mashikoyaki

Mashiko ware (益子焼, Mashiko-yaki) is a type of Japanese pottery traditionally made in Mashiko, Tochigi.

Early pottery in Mashiko dates back to the Jōmon and Yayoi periods. Mashikoyaki is often thought of as simple and rustic in style, with brown and maybe a little red glaze, but modern pottery made in Mashiko today is found in many styles, on account of the creative freedom brought to Mashiko by Shoji Hamada. Modern Mashikoyaki dates only to 1853, when a potter discovered that local clay here was ideal for ceramics. The style was popularized in 1930 when Hamada, later designated as a Living National Treasure, set up a kiln in Mashiko. Hamada's student, Tatsuzō Shimaoka, was also designated as a Living National Treasure and worked in Mashiko from 1953 until his death in 2007.

Mashiko is a folkware kiln site that is unlike some of the other older kiln sites around Japan. Following Shoji Hamada, people looking to return to a more traditional Japanese lifestyle settled in the area.

Twice a year, coinciding with the Golden Week Holidays in the first week of May, and again for the first week of November, there is a pottery and crafts festival where potters and craftsmen from Mashiko and surrounding areas come to the town and set up stalls.

== See also ==
- Meibutsu
- Mingei
