= Japanese Folk Crafts Museum =

Art museum in Tokyo, Japan

Coordinates: 35°39′39″N 139°40′45″E

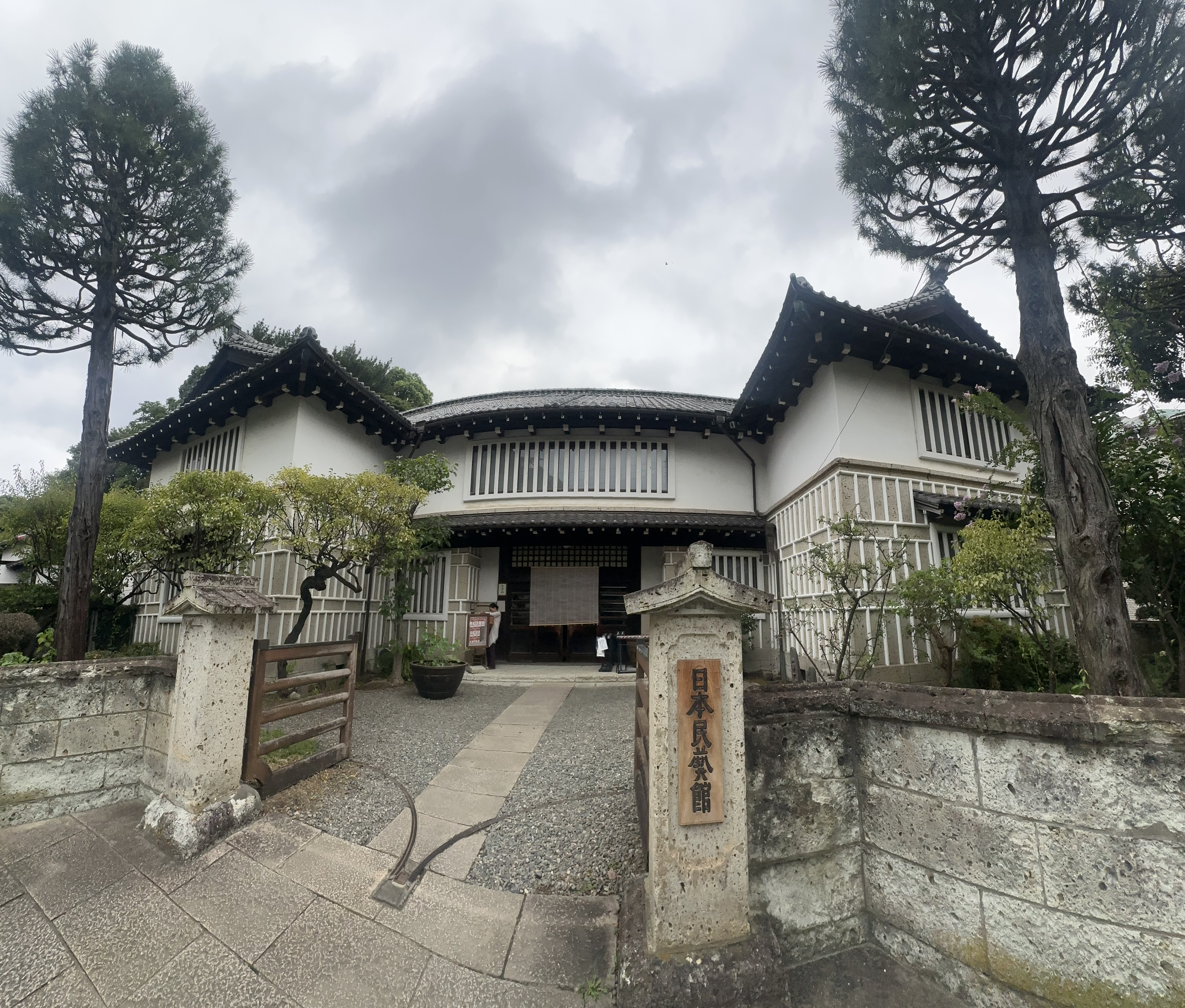
Japan Folk Crafts Museum in Tokyo

The Japan Folk Crafts Museum (Japanese: 日本民藝館, Hepburn: Nihon Mingeikan) is a museum in the 4th city block of Komaba, Meguro Ward, Tokyo, Japan, dedicated to the collecting, preserving, researching, and exhibition of the hand-crafted art of ordinary people, mingei, often translated as folk crafts. Access is from Komaba-Tōdaimae Station of Keio Inokashira Line.

The museum covers 1,818 square meters and was constructed with a traditional Japanese architectural style. A 'long' stone-roofed gate-cum-residence (nagaya-mon) was brought from Tochigi Prefecture and reconstructed in front of the building.

== History ==
Founded in 1936 by Yanagi Sōetsu, a religious philosopher, scholar, art researcher, and advocate in researching folk crafts. It is currently managed by The Japanese Folk Crafts Museum Foundation, a public interest corporation (The Japanese Folk Crafts Museum Foundation, Corporate Number (Assigned by Japan's National Tax Agency): 9013205001720 ) operating from the museum.

=== Before Opening ===
The founder, Yanagi Sōetsu, wanted to showcase various types of Japanese and Korean pottery/porcelain, textile arts, lacquer ware, wood and bamboo crafts, and the unknown artisans making these everyday items. Some other specific examples included are Korea's Joseon Period artistic handicrafts and wooden Buddhist statues carved by Mokujiki. The focus on introducing these various types of art history that previously had not been properly appreciated, not considered western fine art or an expensive antique, or by unknown craftsman created the Mingei movement. Inspired by Korean crafts, Yanagi Sōetsu's fascination with folk art developed through multiple trips to Korea during the Japanese colonial period. He defined folk crafts based on how they were made, wanting to highlight the beauty in that which was made by non-professional artists for more utilitarian purposes.

The museum was established in 1936 by Yanagi Sōetsu, the founder of the mingei movement; Hamada Shōji succeeded him as its director. Yanagi and Hamada officially announced their desire to establish a folk crafts museum in 1926. Construction began on the museum in 1935 and was completed in 1936.

=== Museum Opening ===
Yanagi moved back to Tokyo in January 1935 and in March received an offer of 100,000 yen from businessman, Magosaburō Ōhara (founder of Kuraray, Ohara Museum of Art, and The Ohara Institute for Social Research, Hosei University) to help fund opening a museum. In September 1936, the Japanese Folk Crafts Museum was opened next to his house. Yanagi was the first director and the opening exhibition was an "Exhibition of Crafts by Contemporary Artists,” containing work from potters such as Shōji Hamada, Kawai Kanjirō, and Tomimoto Kenkichi.

== Facility ==
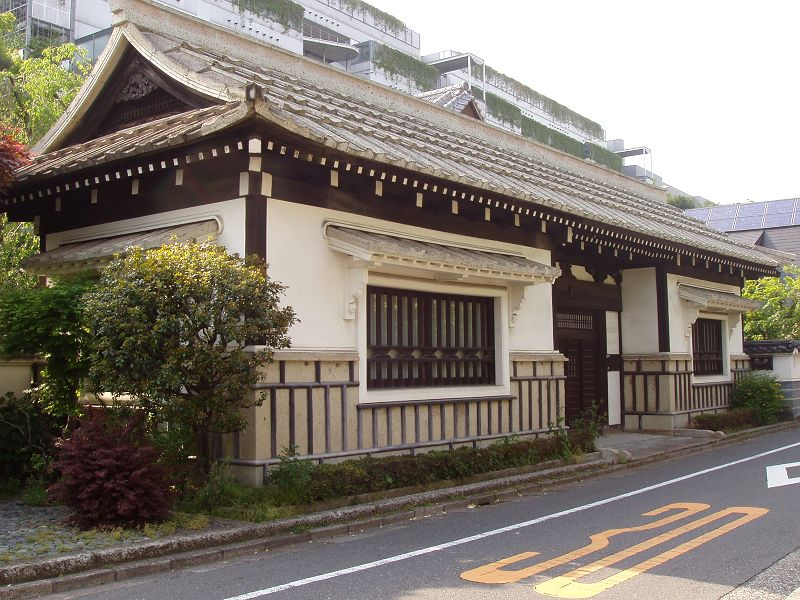
Western Building（Nagaya Gate）（Photographed in April, 2008）

- Main Building – A 2 story wooden construction with a tile roof and a total floor space of 685.26m^{2}
- New Building – Completed in 1982, it is a reinforced concrete construction with a total floor space of 754.46m^{2}.

It is built where the original main hall was and is connected to the main building.. The original main hall was dismantled and reconstructed in Toyota City's folk art museum.

- Western Building – Yanagi's residence (newly restored and open to the public for a limited time, 4 times a month) and the Nagaya gate (not open to the public) were both built in the Meiji Period. They are across the street from the main building.

In 2001 each building was reinforced/renovated with support from the Nippon Foundation and financial world/business circles.

== Cultural Assets of Japan ==
=== Important Cultural Properties of Japan ===
- Painted Karatsu jar with reed pattern – registered in 2003. It is considered a representative example of Karatsu pottery.

=== Designated Tangible Cultural Property in Tokyo ===
- Main Building（including the connected wall）
- The Western Building was the residence of Yanagi Sōetsu
- Western Building's Nagaya Gate（including the connected wall）

== Publications ==
The museum has published a number of books about its collection and special exhibitions, including the following:

- Guide of the Japan Folk Crafts Museum (1st edition 2016; revised edition 2025).

== See also ==
- Tomimoto Kenkichi Memorial Museum
- Folk Cultural Properties
- Japanese craft
- National Crafts Museum – Museum in Kanazawa, Ishikawa Prefecture, Japan
