= James Greig =

James Greig may refer to:

- Sir James Greig (British politician) (1859–1934), British barrister and Liberal Party politician
- James Greig (Australian politician), member of the Western Australian Legislative Council
- James Greig (banker) (1834–?), banker and member of the Legislative Council of Hong Kong
- James Greig (potter) (1936–1986), New Zealand potter
