= James Greig (potter) =

New Zealand potter (1936–1986)

James 'Jim' Greig
- Born: James Greig; 20 March 1936; Stratford, New Zealand
- Died: 25 September 1986 (aged 50); Kyoto, Japan
- Known for: Pottery
- Spouse: Rhondda Greig
- Website: http://www.jamesgreig.nz/

James Greig (1936–1986) was a New Zealand potter.

== Early life and education ==
Greig was born in Stratford, New Zealand in 1936. He studied at Wellington Technical College and went on to Auckland University to study architecture. There he met fellow architecture student Rhondda Greig, whom he married in 1962.

== Career ==
An encounter with the work of potter Len Castle encouraged Greig to take up pottery, and he attended Castle's evening classes for three years before moving to the Northland Region in 1961 to set up a pottery studio. He developed a strong relationship with Len Castle and was influenced by his work. Between 1964 and 1967, he became the resident potter in charge of the art and design centre at Massey University in Palmerston North. In 1968 he moved to Greytown in the Wairarapa and set up his own studio.

In 1978, a QEII Arts Council grant allowed Greig to travel to Japan where he studied the techniques of Japanese potters and developed strong connections with the pottery community, becoming particularly influenced by potter Kawai Kanjirō. Greig also travelled to Korea, Thailand, Nepal, Mexico and the USA during this trip.

In 1982, Greig was awarded a Japan Foundation Fellowship to spend a year living, working and studying in Japan. During this year, he was invited to exhibit in the highly regarded Tachibana Ten exhibition. He also exhibited work at Akasaka Green Gallery in Tokyo in 1983 and 1985.

Greig was made a Cultural Ambassador by the New Zealand Government in 1986. In 1986 he exhibited over 200 pieces of his work in the Tachikichi Department store in Kyoto. The day of the exhibition, Greig suffered a heart attack and died in his hotel room.

== Hot air ballooning ==
Greig had a strong interest in understanding the landscape in different ways, and a desire to see it from a birds-eye view. For this reason he travelled to Australia in the 1970s to train in hot air ballooning and obtained his own balloon back home. Greig received many invitations to fly around the country, many of which he accepted while also focusing on his ceramics career.

== Collections ==
His works are held in the collections of the Victoria and Albert Museum in London, the Museum of New Zealand Te Papa Tongarewa, The Dowse Art Museum, in the Japanese Imperial household and at the United Nations Headquarters in New York. He has exhibited with The Group and the New Zealand Academy of Fine Arts.

In 2016 Te Papa made a major acquisition of 23 pieces from the artist's estate, including unfired bisque works.

== Retrospective exhibition ==
A survey of Greig's work, James Greig: Defying Gravity, including many pieces not previously exhibited, opened at The Dowse Art Museum in December 2016.

== Further information ==
- Kimitoshi Sato, Beyond East and West: Potter Jim Greig seen from the perspective of Japanese colleague Kimitoshi Sato, New Zealand Crafts no. 24, Winter 1988
- Michael Volkerling, Jim Greig, New Zealand Crafts no. 19, Summer 1986.
- Combining culture and landscapes, interview with Defying Gravity exhibition curator Sian van Dyk, Upbeat programme, Radio New Zealand, 21 December 2016
- Mark Amery,Review of Defying Gravity, The Big Idea, 17 January 2017
- Artist website
