= Otake Kokichi =

Japanese feminist writer and activist (1893–1966)

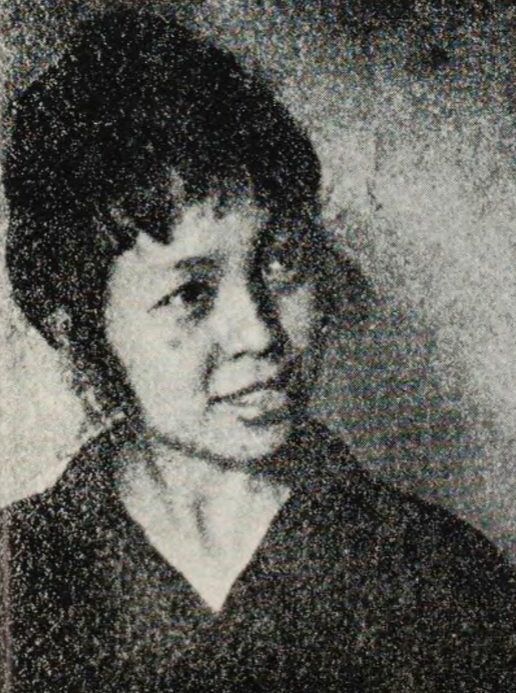
- Born: Otake Kazue; 1893; Osaka, Japan
- Died: 1966 (aged 72–73)
- Spouse: Tomimoto Kenkichi (married 1914-1945)
- Partner: Hiratsuka Raicho (1911-1912)
- Children: Tomimoto Akira and Sue

Otake Kazue (1893–1966), best known by her pen name, Otake Kokichi (尾竹紅吉), was a feminist writer and activist in early 20th century Japan. She was an artist, and she received higher education at Japan Women's College. She joined the Japanese Bluestocking Society (青鞜社, Seitō-sha) and started contributing to the Bluestocking magazine (青鞜, Seitō) in 1911. She became a controversial member because she instigated the "Five-colored sake" and Yoshiwara incidents and because of her lesbian affair with Hiratsuka Raicho. She left the group in 1912, and after dealing with her declining mental and physical health, she went on to marry Tomimoto Kenkichi, change her name to Tomimoto Kazue, and have two children. Otake lived separately from Kenkichi for many years, and she started going by her pen name again during this time. The couple divorced following World War II because of their extreme political differences. In her writing career post-Bluestocking, she incorporated first-wave feminist, Marxist, and anti-imperialist ideas into her fiction works. While she is regarded as a pioneer for queer feminism in Japan, her extended breaks from writing to raise her children and protest the Second Sino-Japanese War led to her having a whitewashed legacy.

== Early years ==
Otake Kazue was born in 1893 in Osaka. Her father was a woodcut printing artist and urged her to be his heir, and her mother educated her about feminine arts like shamisen (三味線) and dance. Her mother was a Sōtō Zen Buddhist and her father was from a Jōdo Shinshū family. Her father later converted to Christianity and changed his name to Francisco Otake after his wife died and his daughter moved to Tokyo.

Growing up, Otake would often sneak to the library and read books that offered different perspectives about life. Some of her ideological influences were Dostoyevsky, Schopenhauer, Tolstoy, Buddha, Da Vinci, and Hiratsuka Raicho.

Otake went to art school in Suginami-ku and later went to Japan Women's College in Tokyo. While she was in Tokyo, she lived with her Christian aunt and uncle. Her uncle, Otake Chikuha, was a famous Japanese painter.

== Bluestocking Society involvement and controversies ==
After learning about Bluestocking in 1911, Otake Kazue became a fan. She joined the Japanese Bluestocking Society in 1911 as an illustrator and contributor for the magazine. This is when she started going by the pen name, Otake Kokichi. Within a year of joining, Otake became a controversial figure within the group for the "Five-colored sake" incident, the Yoshiwara Incident, and her relationship with Hiratsuka Raicho.

=== "Five-colored sake" Incident ===
In the summer of 1912, Otake was out at a restaurant gathering subscriptions for Bluestocking. She was shown a new cocktail that had five different liquors in it. In her excitement over the drink, she wrote a fictional story about Hiratsuka drinking the "Five-colored sake" with a man. Newspapers took the story as factual and started berating Hiratsuka for drinking alcohol by calling her a "New Woman".

=== Yoshiwara incident ===
Otake's uncle brought her on many trips to Yoshiwara to talk with the oiran (花魁). In the summer of 1912, Otake invited other women from the Japanese Bluestocking Society, Hiratsuka and Nakano Hatsuko, to go to Yoshiwara with her. They hired a geisha named Eizan to ask about how she felt working there.

Otake bragged about the trip to some of her friends, and the story was soon published in newspapers. Public outrage over the story led to someone stoning Hiratsuka's house. Other members of the Japanese Bluestocking Society called to expel Otake for exploiting Yoshiwara women and bringing negative press to their group.

=== Relationship with Hiratsuka Raicho ===
In the 1910s in Japan, lesbianism was pathologized. From 1911 to 1912, Otake and Hiratsuka became involved in a one-year public relationship. To avoid being pathologized, the women compared their relationship to nanshoku (男色). Both women dressed in men's clothes, and Hiratsuka called Otake "her boy".

The press called attention to the affair by calling Hiratsuka a sex-addicted bisexual and Otake a natural lesbian. Both were also mocked for their masculine gender expressions and imitation of nanshoku.

== After Bluestocking Society ==
The incidents that Otake was at the center of and the subsequent declining reputation of her Christian aunt and uncle caused Otake to leave the Bluestocking society in 1912.

=== Mental and physical health ===
Otake experienced intense stress from the backlash of these incidents that caused her to self-harm. She had also been unknowingly dealing with tuberculosis.

In the summer of 1912, Otake was admitted into a sanatorium in Chigasaka to recover. Hiratsuka visited Otake in the hospital. While at the hospital, Hiratsuka met Okumura Hirosha, an artist who was also visiting Otake. Even though Otake and Hiratsuka's relationship never officially ended, Hiratsuka went on to marry Okumura on New Year's Eve of 1913.

=== Family ===
In 1914, Otake met, fell in love with, and married Tomimoto Kenkichi, an imperialist and gifted ceramic artist from the Nara prefecture. Otake changed her name to Tomimoto Kazue. Soon after the marriage, the couple moved to Anzemara and lived with the Tomimoto family. They had two daughters named Tomimoto Akira and Sue. Akira's name (陽) came from the same Japanese characters that were used in the Bluestocking manifesto that compared women to the sun (太陽).

Otake eventually left the Tomimoto household because of the mounting pressure that was being placed on her to be a traditional wife and mother. For many years, Otake and Kenkichi lived separately, and Otake raised their daughters. While they lived separately, Otake started going by her pen name Otake Kokichi again. Soon after World War II ended, Kenkichi divorced Otake for wearing men's kimonos, ruining his imperial reputation, and having lesbian tendencies.

=== Career and activism ===
After leaving the Japanese Bluestocking Society, Otake translated feminist theory, made art for journal covers, and wrote fairytales and fiction for different magazines for work. Otake used both subtle and straightforward feminist and Marxist messaging in many of the works she produced during this time. For example, in 1913, she used the interview with the geisha during the Yoshiwara incident to argue that geisha should be treated as humans in “A Gathering of Geisha” in the Chūō Kōron (中央公論). To demonstrate her protest against the Second Sino-Japanese War, she took a hiatus from writing and opened a salon to support progressive women.

Part of her activism included teaching her daughters values considered radical during the time period. Otake educated her daughters with a variety of perspectives and taught them to reject the "Good Wives, Wise Mothers" construct. In 1928, Otake and Akira were arrested for attending a labor protest, which brought public shame upon Kenkichi.

== Legacy ==
There has only been one full-length biography about Otake Kokichi, called Seitō no Onna: Otake Kokichi den (Woman of Bluestocking: a biography of Otake Kokichi) by Watanabe Sumiko. Otake was not viewed as a mastermind of writing, so there is no published collection of her works.

Otake is often referenced as a pioneer for lesbian feminism in Japan, such as in the Mainchu Daiku by Izumo Marou.

== Contributions and works ==
- Bluestocking illustrator and writer (1911-1912)
- "Returning From Asakusa (To Raichō)" (1911)
- “A Gathering of Geisha” (January 1913) in the Chūō Kōron (Central Review)
- Safuran (Saffron) publisher (March–August 1914)
- Women's Art fiction writer
- Funa fairytale writer
