= Sardar Gurcharan Singh =

Sardar Gurcharan Singh was an Indian potter.

He studied in Japan. After his return for a couple of years his patron was the Maharao Raja of Bundi. He set up his kiln in Delhi in 1952. He received the Padma Shri for his services in the development of Indian ceramic art.

In 1991 the Delhi Blue Pottery Trust was founded by him to further develop the art.

A documentary film "The Lotus and the Swan" was made about his life by Nirmal Chander and presented at the Dharamshala International Film Festival.

He died in 1995 at the age of 99.

== See also ==
- Bernard Leach
- Hamada Shōji
