= Shōji Hamada =

Japanese artist (1894 – 1978)

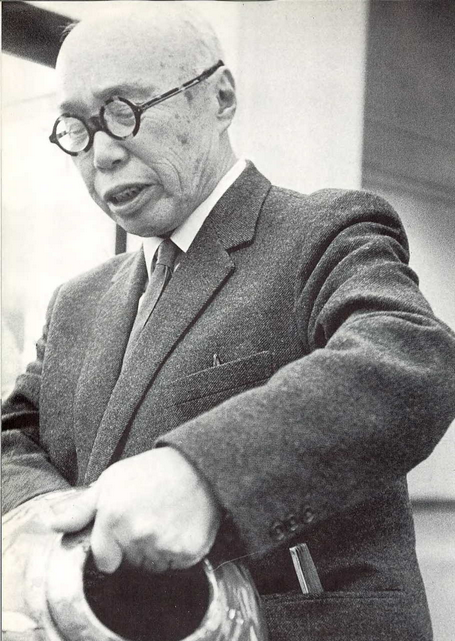
Hamada at the University of Michigan, 1967 or 1968

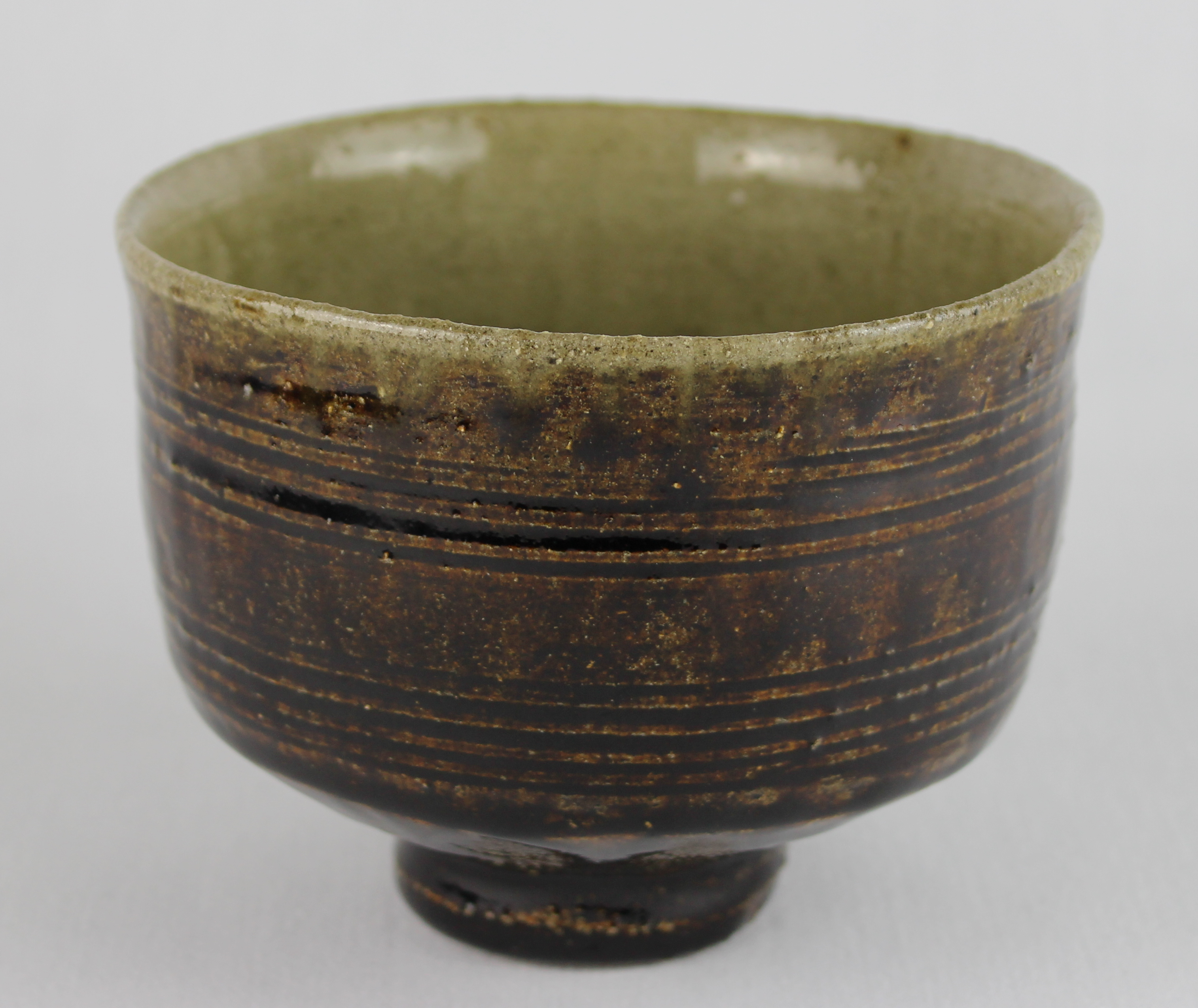
Thrown, combed tea bowl by Shoji Hamada

Shōji Hamada (濱田 庄司, Hamada Shōji; December 9, 1894 – January 5, 1978) was a Japanese potter. He had a significant influence on studio pottery of the twentieth century, and a major figure of the mingei (folk-art) movement, establishing the town of Mashiko as a pottery centre. In 1955 he was designated a "Living National Treasure".

== Biography ==
Hamada was born in Kawasaki, Japan, in 1894, and was named Shoji (象ニ).

After finishing his studies at the elite Hibiya High School, he studied ceramics at Tokyo Institute of Technology, then known as Tokyo Industrial College with Kawai Kanjirō under Itaya Hazan. As the sole students in the school interested in becoming artist-potters, Hamada and the slightly elder Kawai were soon friends, touring the city in search of inspiration. They worked together in Kyoto at the former body of the Kyoto Municipal Institute of Industrial Technology and Culture where they experimented on glazes using various minerals. They were acquainted by Yanagi Sōetsu and Tomimoto Kenkichi while visiting potteries and exhibitions.

Hamada was deeply impressed by a Tokyo exhibition of ceramic art by Bernard Leach, who was then staying with Yanagi Sōetsu, and wrote to Leach seeking an introduction. The two found much in common and became good friends, so much so that Hamada asked and was granted permission to accompany Leach to England in 1920 when the latter decided to return and establish a pottery there.

Hamada and Leach were influential participants in the Pottery seminar at Black Mountain College in 1952, attended by many younger and later prominent potters.

== Pottery in Mashiko ==
Having spent three years in St Ives with Bernard Leach, he returned to Japan in 1923 and traveled to potteries and stayed at Tsuboya in Okinawa Prefecture for weeks, then eventually established his workshop in Mashiko, about 100 km (62 mi) north-east of Tokyo. Here, he built his own pottery and committed himself to using only locally sourced materials, not only in the clay he used, but also the glazes he created and the brushes he manufactured himself from dog hair and bamboo.

In 1955 the Japanese government designated him "Living National Treasure", the first time for someone from the field of crafts. The previous year on 29 May 1954, the Cultural Property Protection Act had been amended, and a new Preservers of Important Intangible Cultural Properties (Jūyō Mukei Bunkazai Hojisha) designation was passed the bill in November for its criteria and approval details.

Following Yanagi Muneyoshi, Hamada was enthusiastic about folk art movement in Japan. When Yanagi died in 1961, he succeeded as the second director of the Japanese Folk Crafts Museum, and in 1977, he opened his own museum at his home, Mashiko Sankōkan (present Shoji Hamada Memorial Mashiko Sankokan Museum), and exhibited his collection of folk crafts from Japan and abroad.

Hamada Shoji was very supportive of young artists who moved to Mashiko such as his student Shimaoka Tatsuzō, and Kamoda Shōji, and was also important in establishing Mashiko as a destination for day tourism. He provided housing and hosted workplace for visiting potters from abroad as well.

Hamada died in Mashiko on January 5, 1978.

== Preserving local architecture ==
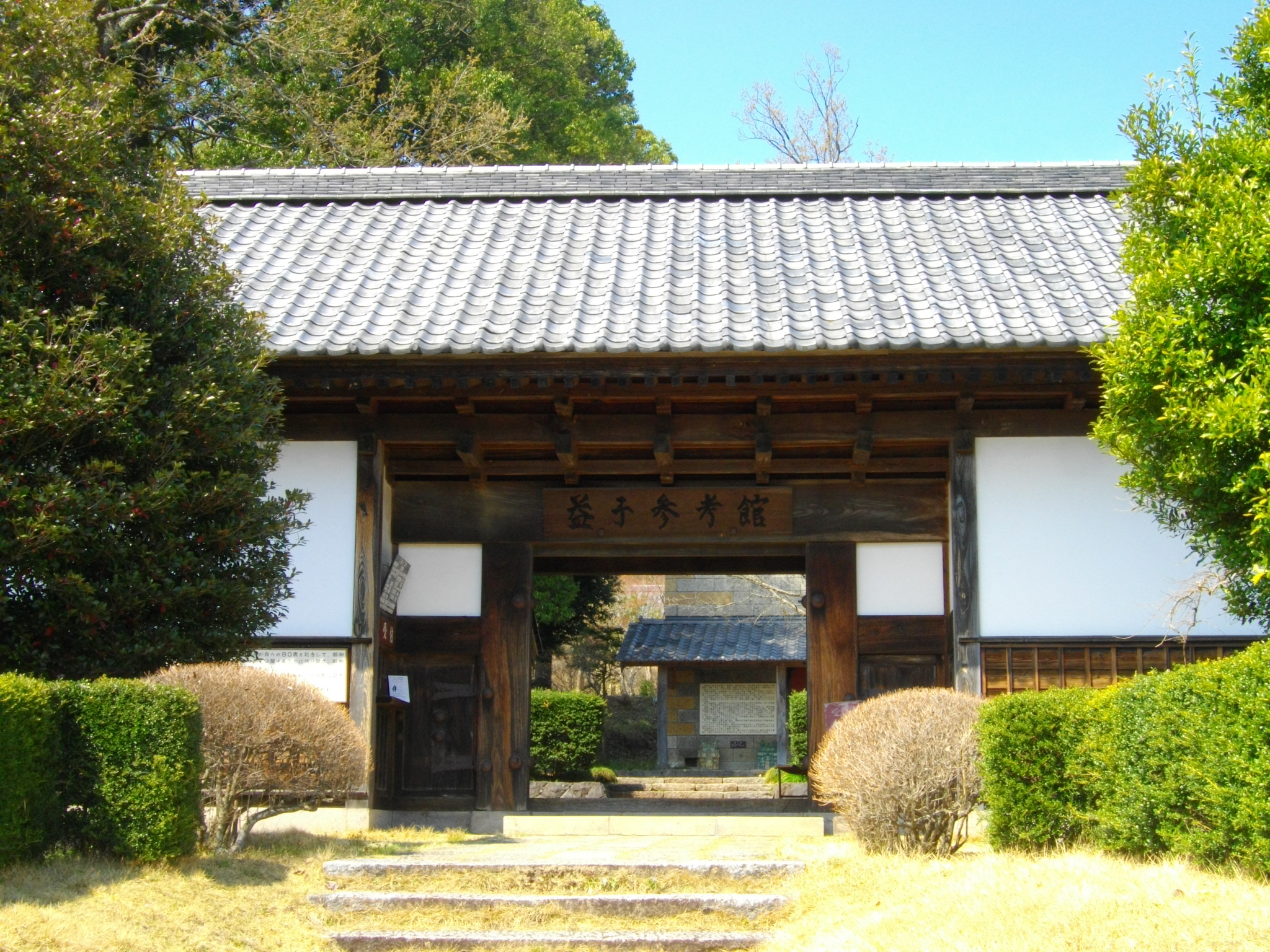
Shōji Hamada Memorial Mashiko Sankokan Museum

Since he moved to Mashiko, Hamada bought, relocated, and refurbished traditional farm houses, stone warehouses, and nagaya-mon gatehouses of Edo period unique to southern Tochigi Prefecture on his property. The first was his residence in 1930, followed by others he used as workshops and for entertaining guests and apprentices, with the last one used since 1942 as his workshop. In 1989 his residence was donated to and rebuilt at Mashiko Museum of Ceramic Art, or Ceramic Art Messe Mashiko, after the house was designated a cultural property of Mashiko. The museum is still open today and visitors can view Hamada's studio, living quarters, and various craft collections.

== Influence ==
Throughout a lifetime dedicated to making pottery he achieved international recognition and his works have been collected by museums across the world. Hamada’s influence was felt not only in his native Japan, particularly in Mashiko, but also in the West. In the United Kingdom and the US, his style and philosophy became well known amongst studio potters, and he was revered as the archetypal "Oriental" potter.

A square plate with iron pigment brushwork by Shōji Hamada

Today Hamada's works attain high prices at auction. In the UK, examples of his work can be seen at the York Art Gallery.

A young Sardar Gurcharan Singh met him and further developed his style of pottery in India.

== Awards and merits ==
- Living National Treasure in 1955
- Medals of Honor (Japan), Purple Ribbon in 1964
- Order of Culture in 1968

Degrees

- Honorary degree in arts, Royal College of Art
