= Kawai Kanjirō =

Japanese potter

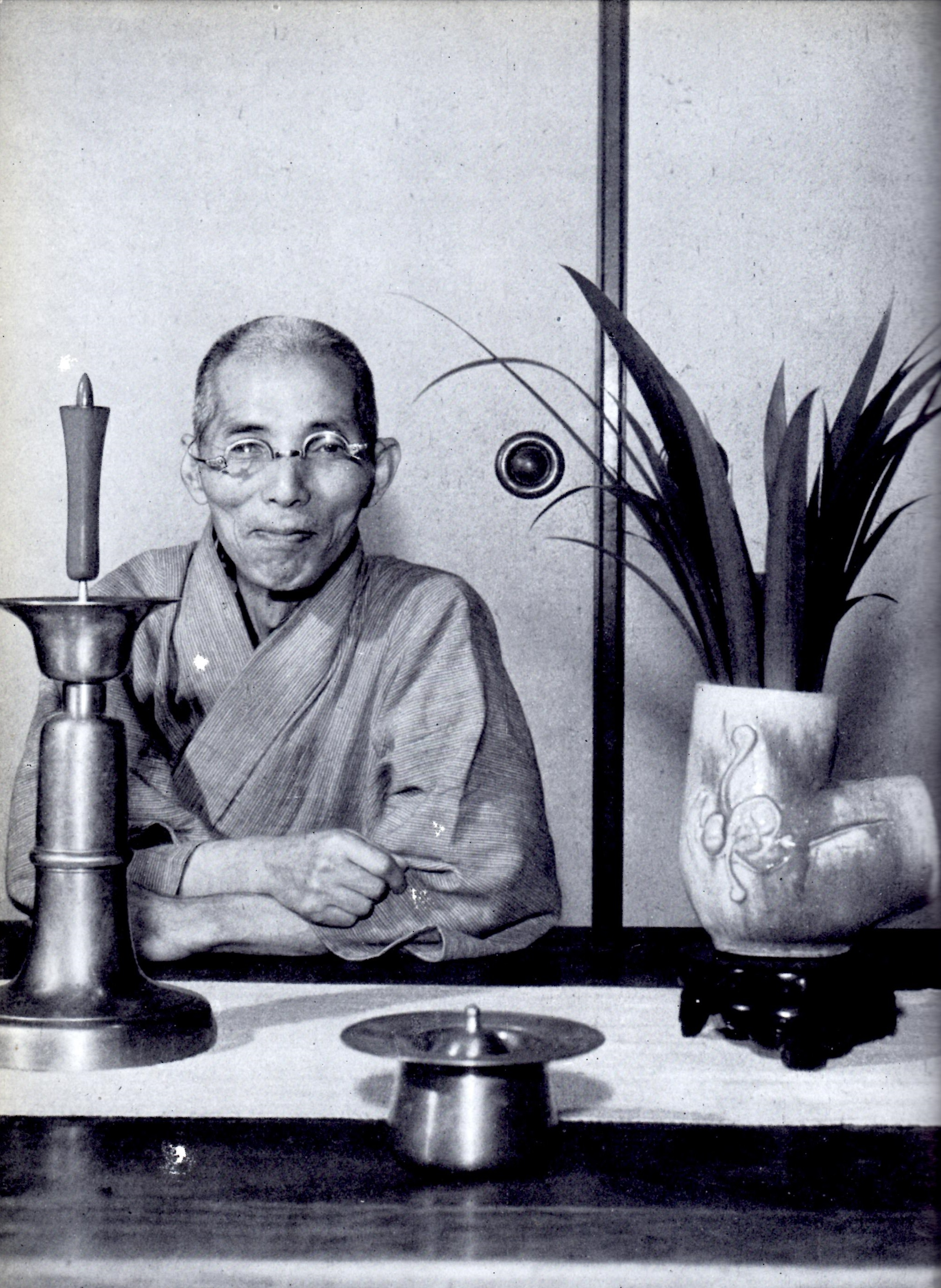
circa 1950

Kawai Kanjirō (河井 寬次郎; 24 August 1890, in Yasugi, Shimane – 18 November 1966) was a Japanese potter and a key figure in mingei (Japanese folk art) and studio pottery movements, which included Bernard Leach, Shōji Hamada, Kenkichi Tomimoto, Shikō Munakata, Keisuke Serizawa, and Tatsuzō Shimaoka, among others.

== Biography ==
Becoming interested in pottery as a child by watching a nearby farmer who made pottery in his spare time, Kawai-san knew by the age of 16 that he wanted to become a potter. Kanjirō graduated from the Tokyo Higher Polytechnical School in 1914 and worked briefly at the Kyoto Research Institute for Ceramics. Hamada Shoji, whom he first met in Tokyo, followed Kawai to Kyoto, where the two are said to have conducted over 10,000 experiments on glazes. Disillusioned with what he felt was an unnecessarily excessive focus on studying theory at both schools, in 1920 he built his own kiln in Kyoto (a climbing kiln "noborigama") "the Shokeiyo, with eight chambers, began the "Kawai Factory" and began to give exhibitions.

Kawai was trained in the use of chemical glazes and gained wide recognition for their use while still in his early twenties. But he was ultimately dissatisfied with this early work and, thanks in large part to a chance encounter with Yanagi Soetsu and Hamada Shoji, turned instead to natural glazes, to nature, or "to the science that precedes all science - and a return to nature was my salvation". He is widely regarded as a master of glazes, especially of warm red copper (shinsha or yuriko - one of his trademark colors), rich brown iron (tetsu-yu), chrome and cobalt (gosu).

He was also an artist, calligrapher, sculptor, writer and philosopher. As a man who respected the dignity of simplicity and collected the works of poor craftspeople from all over Asia, he admired "ordered poverty" and had a profound love for the unpretentious men of the soil and made their simplicity a part of himself. His pots come in many asymmetrical shapes and show expressionistic techniques such as tsutsugaki (slip-trailed decoration), ronuki (wax-resist) or hakeme (white slip).

Kanjirō refused all official honours, including the designation of Living National Treasure. Like his lifelong friend Hamada, Kawai never signed his work but said, "My work itself is my best signature." His pieces are on display in the Folk Art Museum of Tokyo and each year, the Takashimaya Department Store had an exhibition of his work in their Tokyo and Osaka shops. In November 1953, Kawai-san had one of his biggest exhibitions at the Korin Kaku in Tokyo and over 500 of his pieces were shown.

== Legacy ==
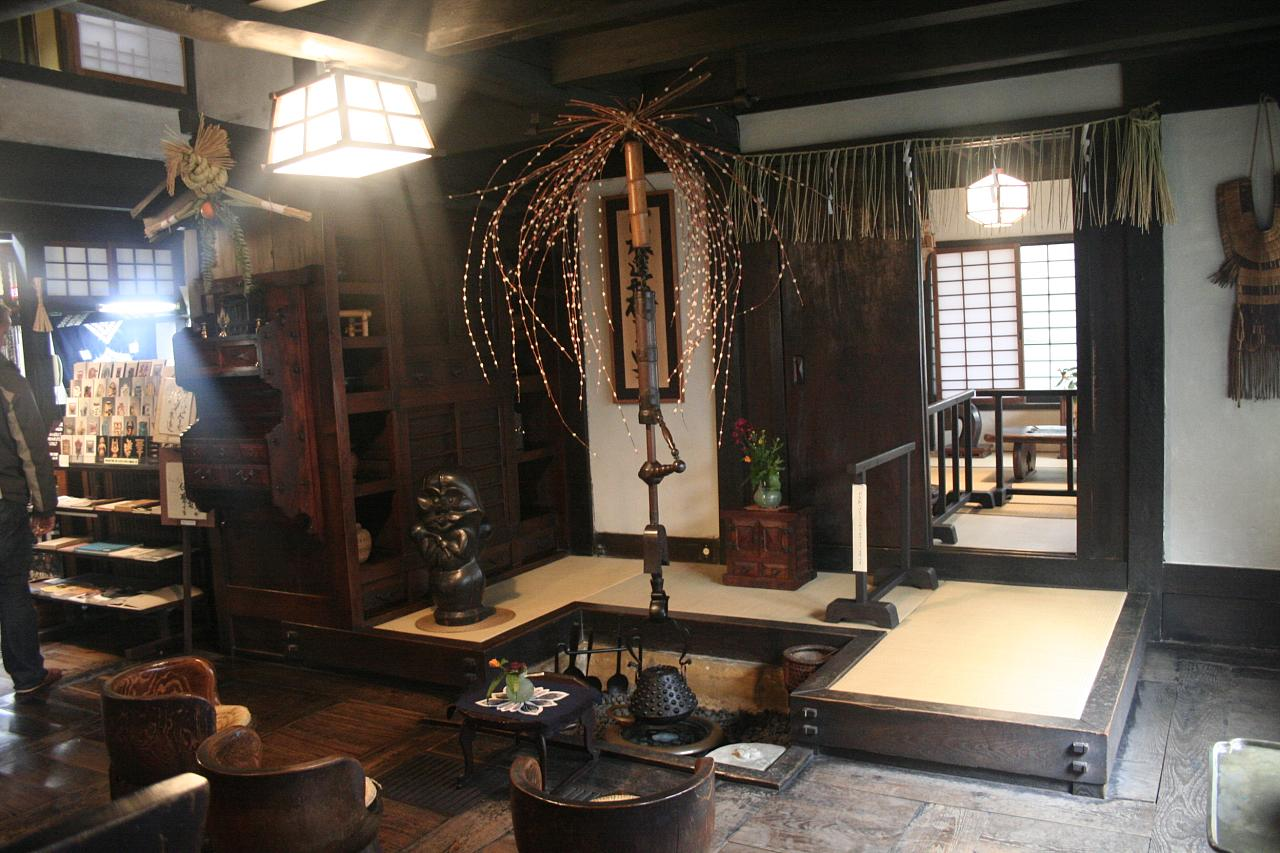
Kanjirō's restored house interior, January 2008

Kawai taught Claude Laloux in the nineteen fifties and mentored a number of Japanese ceramic artists throughout his life.

His house (restored in 1973) in Gojōzaka, Kyoto, is now a museum run by his relatives. Besides a display of his ceramics, some of his sculpture and woodcarvings are included in the collection. His house incorporates both Japanese and Western living styles, so one can see both tansu and tatami and also some Western furnishings. His studio and noborigama kiln are to the rear of the museum. The firing lasted 48 hours and consumed over 2,000 bundles of firewood. The interior temperature reached 1,350 Celsius.

From March 10 to May 10, 2026, the Japan Society exhibited Kawai Kanjirō: House to House, the first U.S. retrospective of his work which included ceramics, as well as wood sculptures and furniture.

== Quotes ==
He was also a poet and, like his pottery, his writing is strong and unconventional. In 1953, a book entitled We Do Not Work Alone was published.

"The pledge of fire: To return to all things purified."

"Everything that is, is not. Everything is, yet at the same time, nothing is. I myself am the emptiest of all."

"When you become so absorbed in your work that beauty flows naturally then your work truly becomes a work of art."

"Any work of art belongs to everyone, because it is whatever each person sees in it." "It is the same with people. We are all one. I am you. The you that only I can see."
