= Tatsuzō Shimaoka =

Japanese potter

Tatsuzō Shimaoka (島岡 達三, Shimaoka Tatsuzō; 27 October 1919 – 11 December 2007) was a Japanese mingei inspired potter who studied under Shōji Hamada and later became the second Living National Treasure of Mashiko, Japan. He was best known for his unique Jōmon zogan style of pottery, and was a master of many slip decorating and firing techniques for pottery. Throughout his career, Shimaoka worked collaboratively with a group of workers, students, and apprentices from Japan and abroad. After supervising the loading of what would become his last noborigama firing in late 2007, Shimaoka collapsed, and died several weeks later in late 2007 from acute liver failure at Mashiko in Tochigi Prefecture.

== Early life ==
Shimaoka was born near Ikebukuro in Tokyo. At 19 he decided he wanted to become a mingei potter, after visiting the Japanese Folk Crafts Museum, which he found very inspiring. At that time Shimaoka was attending the Tokyo Institute of Technology, and after an accelerated war time graduation in 1942 he served as an officer in the Japanese army in Burma and spent some time as a prisoner of war. It wasn't until 1946 that he was able to start his pottery apprenticeship with Hamada.

== Career ==
In 1946 Shimaoka began his apprenticeship with the potter Shōji Hamada in Mashiko, Japan. The formal apprenticeship ended in 1949. After working for three years at the Tochigi Prefecture Ceramic Research Center, in 1953 Shimaoka set up his own pottery next door to his former teacher Shoji. The following year he gave his first exhibition, it was held in Tokyo. 1963 saw the first of his yearly exhibitions in Tokyo's Matsuya Ginza department store. He would later go on to also have yearly exhibitions at Hankyu department store in Osaka. Shimaoka's first American exhibition was held in Boston in 1974, his first European exhibition was at the Museum für Kunst und Gewerbe Hamburg (Museum of Arts and Crafts) in 1977.

Over the years Shimaoka has frequently lectured and taught in the United States and Canada.

His work can be found in many museums around the world, including the Victoria and Albert Museum, the Metropolitan Museum of Art, the Museum of New Zealand, the British Museum, the ASU Art Museum, the Minneapolis Institute of Art, the Brooklyn Museum, the University of Michigan Museum of Art, the Artizon Museum, the Asian Art Museum, the John Young Museum of Art, the Royal Ontario Museum, and the Israel Museum.

Press Molded Bottle by Tatsuzo Shimaoka.

== Pottery style ==
In 1996 Shimaoka was designated a Living National Treasure (Ningen Kokuho) by the Japanese Government. This honor was bestowed upon him for his unique contribution to the art of pottery.

Shimaoka's Jōmon zogan pottery was inspired by two ancient processes. The Jōmon rope like process and the Korean Yi Dynasty process of adding white slip to decorative indentations.

Jōmon involves using silk and other dense ropes (often obihimo, or cord to wrap the obi for Japanese kimono) to make impressions in leather hard clay, while zogan is a process whereby slip is applied and inlaid in multiple layers into the impressed pattern. The slipped pattern is then carved back to the clay, highlighting it and leaving patterns exposed. Hamada Shoji is reputed to have brought the technique for salt glazing to Japan after a visit to Europe in the early 1950s, and Shimaoka was also widely known for his salt glaze work. He designed one of the first noborigama kilns in Mashiko that had markedly different atmospheres in each chamber, and he was also a pioneer in importing clays from around Japan to Mashiko, such as clay from Shigaraki. His noborigama had separate chambers for ash covered ware, charcoal reduced ash covered ware, high temperature reduction feldspathic ash glazes, traditional Mashiko glazes such as seiji, nuka, kaki, and kuro, and a final chamber for salt glaze.

== Honors ==
- Order of the Rising Sun, 1999.
