= Tomimoto Kenkichi Memorial Museum =

Museum in Ando, Nara, Japan

Coordinates: 34°36′14.6″N 135°45′26.7″E

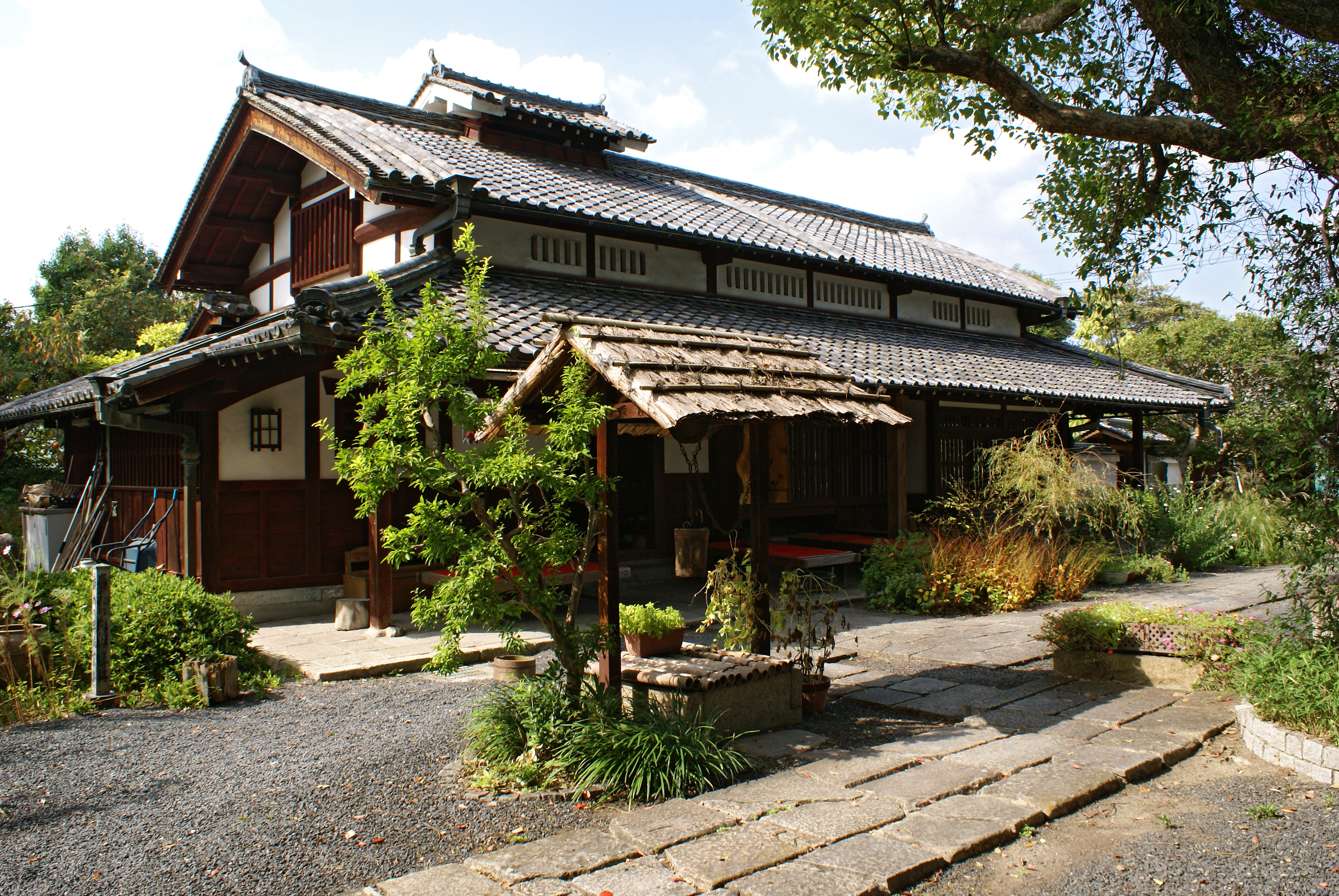
Tomimoto Kenkichi Memorial Museum

The Tomimoto Kenkichi Memorial Museum (富本憲吉記念館, Tomimoto Kenkichi Kinenkan) opened in Ando, Nara Prefecture, Japan in 1974. It is dedicated to the life and works of Tomimoto Kenkichi, who was born in the vicinity.
