= Mingei =

Japanese folk art philosophy formed in the 1920s

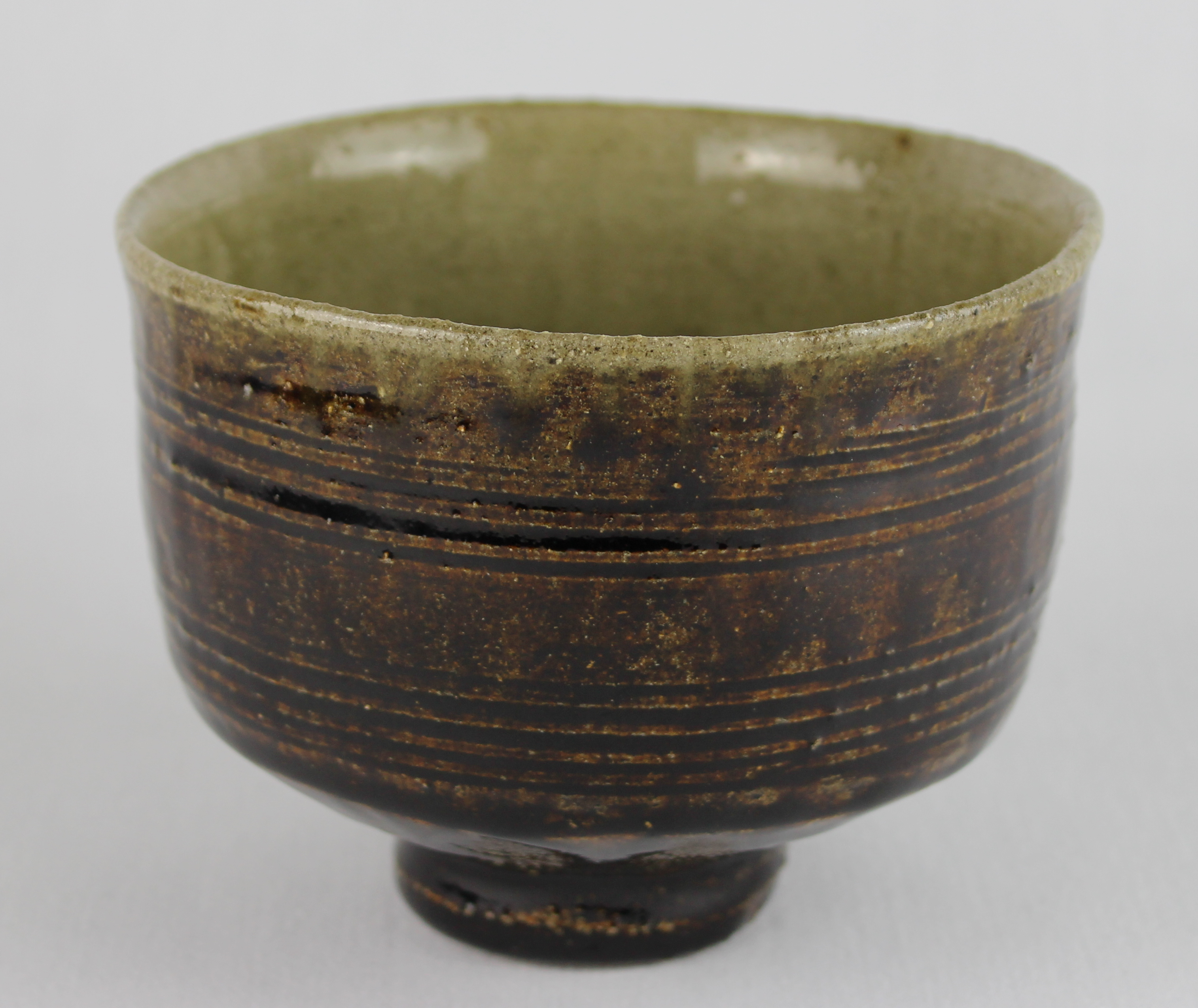
Thrown, combed tea bowl by Shōji Hamada

The concept of mingei (民芸), variously translated into English as "folk craft", "folk art" or "popular art", was developed from the mid-1920s in Japan by a philosopher and aesthete, Yanagi Sōetsu (1889–1961), together with a group of craftsmen, including the potters Hamada Shōji (1894–1978) and Kawai Kanjirō (1890–1966). As such, it was a conscious attempt to distinguish ordinary crafts and functional utensils (pottery, lacquerware, textiles, and so on) from "higher" forms of art – at the time much admired by people during a period when Japan was going through rapid westernisation, industrialisation, and urbanization. In some ways, therefore, mingei may be seen as a reaction to Japan's rapid modernisation processes.

== Origins ==
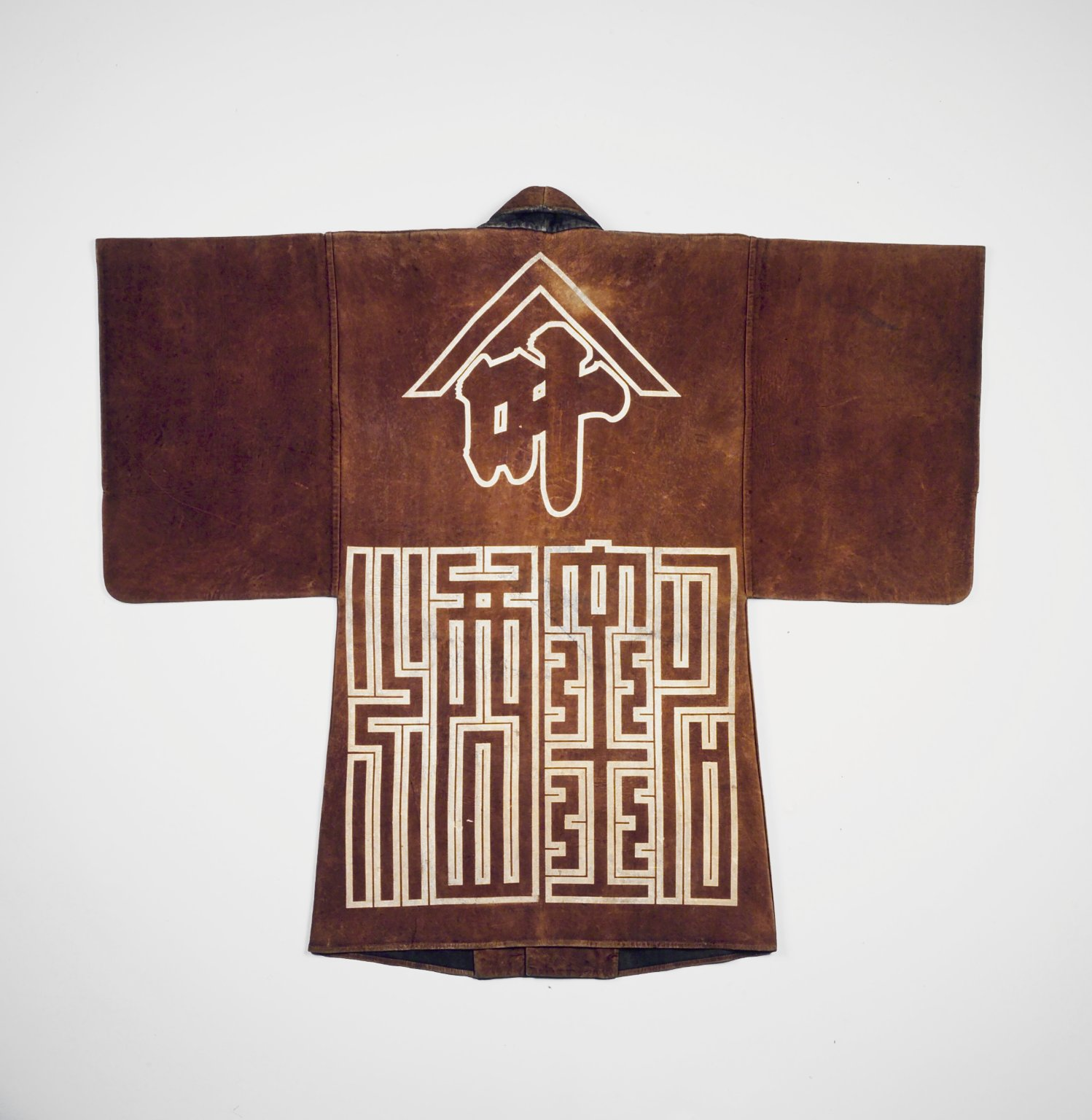
Leather Fireman's Coat, late 19th century. Brooklyn Museum

As a young man, Yanagi developed a liking for Joseon (1392–1910) ceramics, and in 1916, made his first trip to Korea. There he started to collect items, especially pottery, made by local Korean craftsmen. Realising that Yi Dynasty wares had been made by "nameless craftsmen", Yanagi felt that there had to be a similar sort of "art form" in Japan. On returning home, therefore, he became interested in his own country's rich cultural heritage and started collecting "vanishing" craft items. The objects in his collection included woodwork, lacquer ware, pottery and textiles – from Okinawa and Hokkaidō (Ainu), as well as from mainland Japan.

In certain important respects, therefore, what became the Japanese Folk Craft Movement owed much to Yanagi's early interest in Korea, where he established a Chōsen Folk Art Museum in one of the old palace buildings in Seoul in 1924. In the following year – after considerable discussion with two potter friends, Hamada Shōji and Kawai Kanjirō – the phrase that they coined to describe the craftsman's work was mingei (民藝). This was a hybrid term, formed from minshū (民衆), meaning "common people", and kōgei (工藝), or "craft". Yanagi himself translated it into English as "folk craft" (not "folk art"), since he wished to stop people from conceiving of mingei as an individually-inspired "high" art (bijutsu [美術]).

Realising that the general public needed to be educated in his understanding of the beauty of Japanese crafts, Yanagi set about propagating his views in a series of articles, books and lectures, and his first complete work Kōgei no Michi (工藝の道, The Way of Crafts) was published in 1928. In 1931, he started a magazine Kōgei (工藝, Crafts) in which he, and a close circle of friends who thought like him, were able to air their views. Although Yanagi had formally declared the establishment of the Folk Craft Movement (日本民芸運動) in 1926, it really only began with publication of this magazine, and the number of Yanagi's followers increased considerably as a result of their reading its contents. In 1952, Kōgei was absorbed by a second magazine Mingei (民藝, first published in 1939). In 1936, with financial assistance from a few wealthy Japanese businessmen, Yanagi was able to set up the Japan Folk Crafts Museum (Nihon Mingeikan, [日本民芸館]) and three years later, in 1939, launched a second magazine, Mingei (民藝). This remains the official organ of the Japan Folk Craft Association (Nihon Mingei Kyōkai [日本民芸協会]), founded in 1931.

There are, therefore, three manifestations of the Folk Craft Movement: (1) the Folk Craft Museum, which exhibits objects that are seen to be truly "mingei" and which Yanagi intended should establish a "standard of beauty"; (2) the Folk Craft Association, which promotes Yanagi's ideals throughout Japan and publishes two monthly magazines; and (3) the folk craft shop, Takumi (工), which acts as a major folk craft retail sales outlet in Tokyo.

== Theory ==
The philosophical pillar of mingei is "ordinary people's crafts" (民衆的な工芸, minshūteki na kōgei). Yanagi's theoretical and aesthetic proposition was that beauty was to be found in ordinary and utilitarian everyday objects made by nameless and unknown craftsmen – as opposed to higher forms of art created by named artists. In his first book outlining his concept of mingei, originally published in 1928, he argued that utilitarian objects made by the common people were "beyond beauty and ugliness", and outlined a number of criteria that he considered essential to "true" mingei folk crafts.

Yanagi's main focus was on beauty. The beauty of folk crafts, he argued, lay in: (1) the use of natural materials and "natural" hand-made production; (2) traditional methods and design; (3) simplicity and (4) functionality in form and design; (5) plurality, meaning that folk crafts could be copied and reproduced in quantity, leading to (6) inexpensiveness. Beauty was also found in (7) the fact that folk crafts should be made by anonymous – or "unknown" – craftsmen, and not by well-known named artists. Finally, (8) there was the "beauty of health", whereby a healthy attitude during the manufacture of folk crafts led to healthy crafts. In other words, beauty and folk crafts were the product of Japanese tradition – a tradition which he emphasised by saying that mingei should be representative of the regions in which they were produced and make use of natural materials found there.

Yanagi's book The Unknown Craftsman has become an influential work since its first release in English in 1972. In it, he examines the Japanese way of viewing and appreciating art and beauty in everyday crafts. At the same time, however– and by his own admission – his theory was not simply a craft movement based on aesthetics, but "a spiritual movement" in which craftsmen should work according to ethical and religious ideals, if beauty was to be achieved. In this respect, it may be argued that he chose to express his vision of "spirituality" through the medium of folk crafts and was, as a result, concerned with how folk crafts were made, rather than with these crafts as objects in themselves. Provided that they were made according to a certain set of rules laid down by himself, they would naturally accord with his concept of "beauty".

== Direct Perception (直観) and Self Surrender (他力道) ==
Yanagi's main emphasis was on beauty which, in his opinion, was unchanging, created by an immutable spirit. Sung period ceramics, or medieval Gothic architecture were products of the same spirit; "true" man was unchanging, unaffected by cultural or historical background. The present and the past were linked by beauty.

In order to appreciate such beauty, argued Yanagi, one should not allow previous knowledge, prejudice, or subjectivity to cloud one's judgement. This could be achieved by means of what has been variously translated as "intuition", "the seeing eye", and "direct perception" (chokkan, [直観]), whereby a craft object should be seen for what it is, without any prior knowledge or intellectual analysis coming between object and onlooker. It thereby directly communicated the inherent beauty of that same object.

If chokkan was an "absolute foot rule", it also defied logical explanation and was, therefore, very much part of his "spiritual" approach to aesthetics and the appreciation of folk craft beauty. But chokkan was also a method of aesthetic appreciation that could be applied, and recognised, by anyone provided he or she perceived things "directly". In other words, if chokkan was "subjective" or "arbitrary", than it was not "direct" perception at all.

The other half of Yanagi's theory of beauty was concerned with the spiritual attitude of the craftsman (as opposed to that of the person appreciating a craft object). For crafts to be beautiful, he said, the craftsman should leave nature to do the creating; salvation came from outside oneself, from what Yanagi called "self surrender" (tarikidō, [他力道]). Tariki was not denial of the self so much as freedom from the self. Just as an Amidha Buddhist believed he could be saved by reciting the nenbutsu prayer and denying his or her self, so the craftsman could attain a "pure land of beauty" by surrendering his self to nature. No craftsman had within himself the power to create beauty; the beauty that came from "self surrender" was incomparably greater than that of any work of art produced by "individual genius".

== Post-war developments ==
Many of Japan's traditional ways were destroyed following the country's defeat in the Second World War. The outbreak of the Korean War in 1950 led to the Japanese Government instituting a system designed to protect what it considered to be the National Treasures of Japan and individual artist-craftsmen – popularly known as "national treasures" (ningen kokuhō, [人間国宝]) – who were deemed to be holders of important cultural skills (jūyō mukei bunkazai, [重要無形文化財]). The spread of Yanagi's ideas was helped by these developments so that, by about 1960, the concept of mingei had become known not just to a small group of people living in Tokyo, Kyoto and Osaka, but — as a result of publicity by the media — to almost everyone in Japan.

This resulted in enormous consumer demand for hand-made folk crafts, which many people thought included such things as tooth-picks and log cabins, as well as more mainstream crafts. This demand came to be labelled the "mingei boom" and continued until the mid-70s, since when it has gradually declined until becoming almost irrelevant to contemporary Japanese in the 2000s. Nevertheless, craftsmen who had been struggling to make ends meet before and just after the Pacific War, suddenly found themselves comparatively well-off; potters in particular benefited financially from the "boom". With all the publicity surrounding folk crafts, new kilns were set up everywhere. So far as the purists were concerned, however, the day of the "instant potter" had come to accompany the other "instants" of everyday life in Japan – coffee, noodles and geisha. The average craftsman, they said, was interested in mingei for the money that was to be made from it, rather than for its beauty. It was little more than an urban elitist fad.

The mingei boom led to a number of paradoxes affecting Yanagi's original theory of folk crafts. (1) Yanagi had argued that beauty would "be born" (rather than "created") only in a "communal" society, where people cooperated with one another. Such cooperation bound not only one man to another, but man to nature. Folk crafts were in this respect "communal arts". However, consumer demand for mingei objects led to increased mechanisation of production processes which, in themselves, relied far less on cooperative work and labour exchanges than they had in the past. (2) Mechanisation also led to less reliance on, and use of, natural materials – something that Yanagi had insisted upon as essential to his concept of beauty – something which also deprived modern mingei of its specifically "local" qualities. (3) Both media exposure and consumer demand encouraged the emergence of the artist-craftsman (geijutsuka, [芸術家]) intent on making money, and to the gradual disappearance of the less profit-motivated "unknown craftsman". Consequently, (4) mingei as "folk craft" gradually came to be seen as mingei as "folk art". (For further analysis, see)

== Critiques: William Morris and Orientalism ==
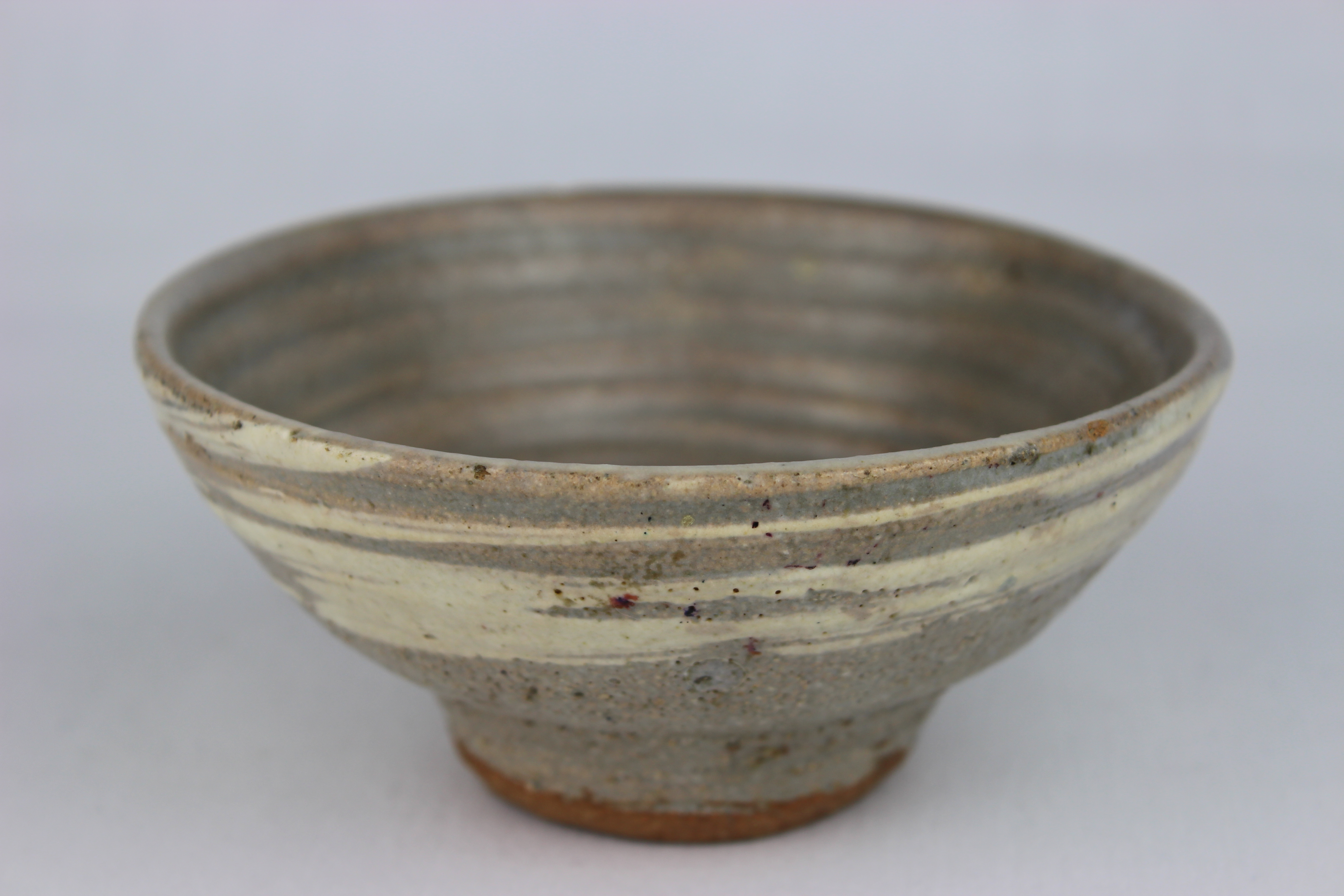
Thrown bowl by Bernard Leach

In the light of Yanagi's emphasis that beauty is derived from 'nature' and 'cooperation', it is not surprising to find in his works a criticism of modern industrialized society. In this respect, he echoed similar theories put forward in other industrialising countries – notably those of William Morris and followers of the Arts and Crafts movement in the United Kingdom. Both men argued there was a close connection between the incentive for profit and the quality of work produced under a capitalist system of wage labour relations. But, whereas Morris's immediate enemy was the division of labour afforded by mechanisation and industrialisation, Yanagi was most opposed to individualism. Change the nature of society, said Morris; change the nature of individualism, said Yanagi, if people wished to have beauty in their lives.

Although often denied by Japanese followers of mingei, as well as explicitly by Yanagi himself, his theory of folk crafts would appear to rely, therefore, on Western writings. Certainly, the similarities between his and Morris's work are too many to be ignored. As to when and how he came across Morris's ideas, however, is not so clear. Brian Moeran has argued that two of Yanagi's closest friends, Bernard Leach (1887–1989) and Kenkichi Tomimoto (富本憲吉) (1886–1963), both potters, introduced him to Morris's ideas, but Yanagi was already deeply steeped in Western science, philosophy, literature and art, and numerous articles in Japanese had already been published on Ruskin and Morris before Yanagi outlined his mingei ideas. Nevertheless, similarities in thought should not be interpreted as being identical. One major difference is that Yanagi introduced Buddhist thinking into his philosophy (especially that of Daisetsu Suzuki and Kitarō Nishida) – something completely lacking in the British Arts and Crafts movement. Ultimately, the main difference between Morris and Yanagi might best be summarised as a demand by one (Morris) to change the nature of society, and by the other (Yanagi) to change the nature of individualism.

Yuko Kikuchi (菊池優子) has further argued that power relations and ultra-nationalism lie at the core of the formation of mingei theory. When Yanagi put forward his "criterion of beauty in Japan" (日本における美の標準, nihon ni okeru bi no hyōjun) in 1927, he was doing so during a period of rising militarism in Japan. The very Japaneseness of mingei, therefore, and Yanagi's failure to recognise the influence of William Morris on his thinking, may be seen to echo the cultural nationalism of Japanese intellectuals at that time. In addition, he applied his "criterion of beauty" to the crafts of the Okinawans and the Ainu in the Japanese peripheries, and to those of the colonies including Korea, Taiwan and Manchuria. Mingei theory, therefore, far from being an Oriental theory, is a "hybridization" and "appropriation" of Occidental ideas such as those of William Morris (1834–1896). Whereas in Leach's view, he had helped Japanese artists to rediscover their original, Oriental culture, Japanese themselves applied Orientalism to their own art and projected the same Orientalism onto the art of other Far Eastern countries like Korea. Kikuchi terms this occidentalist phenomenon "Oriental Orientalism", while Moeran has referred to it as "inverse orientalism, as well as to "counter-orientalism" tendencies found in Japanese society more generally.

In this context, Yanagi's Korea and its Art, in particular, has been severely criticised by Korean intellectuals as a "colonialist view of history". Yanagi defined "beauty of sadness" (悲哀の美, hiai no bi) as the "innate, original beauty created by the Korean race" (民族の固有の美, minzoku no koyū no bi) and expressed his belief that a long history of foreign invasions of Korea was reflected in Korean art, and especially in the "sad and lonely" lines of its pottery. Such a theory has been criticised by Korean scholars as an "aesthetic of colonialism".

== Examples ==
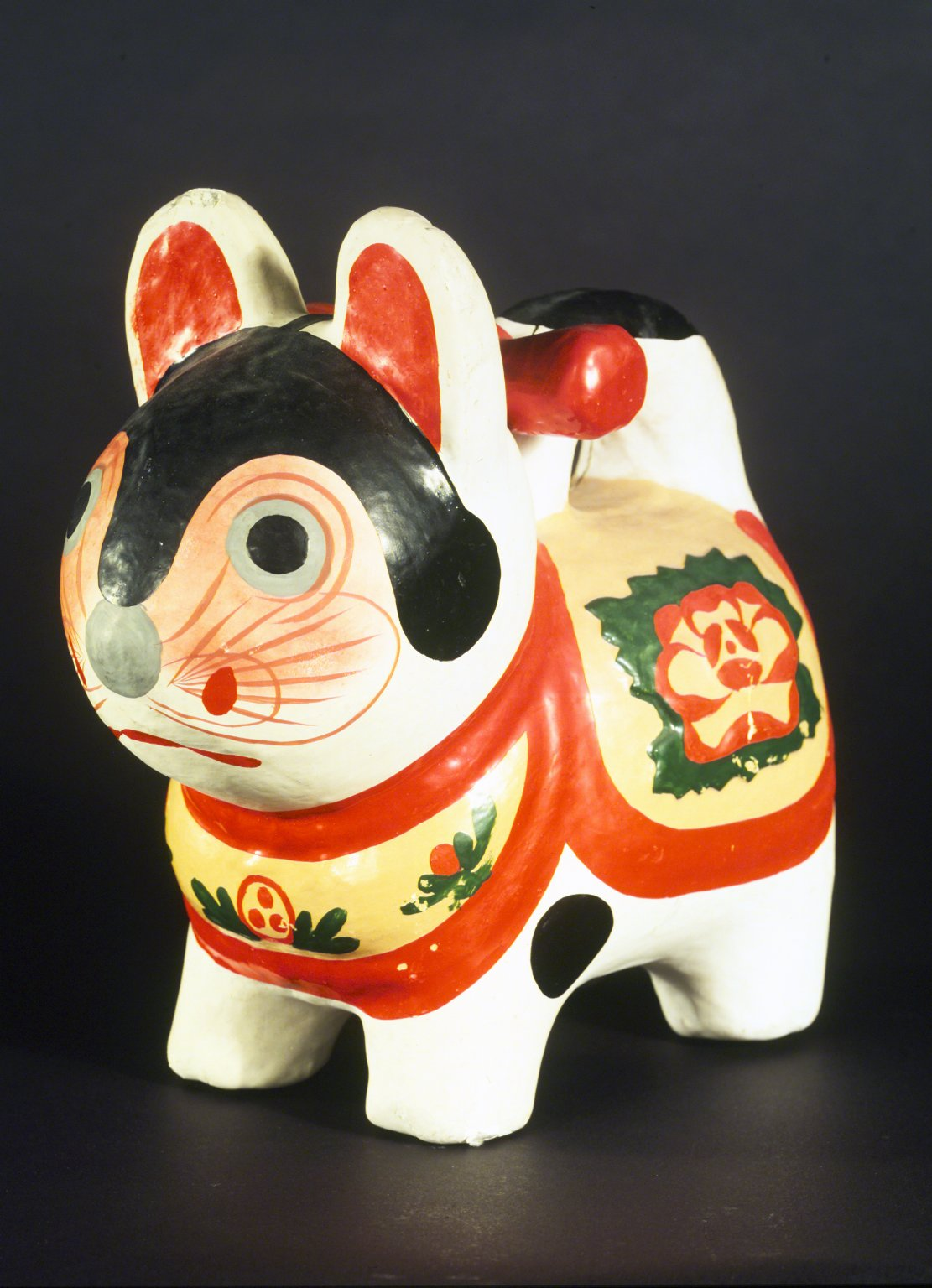
Inu-Hariko (Papier-mache Puppy Doll), ca. 1950. Brooklyn Museum

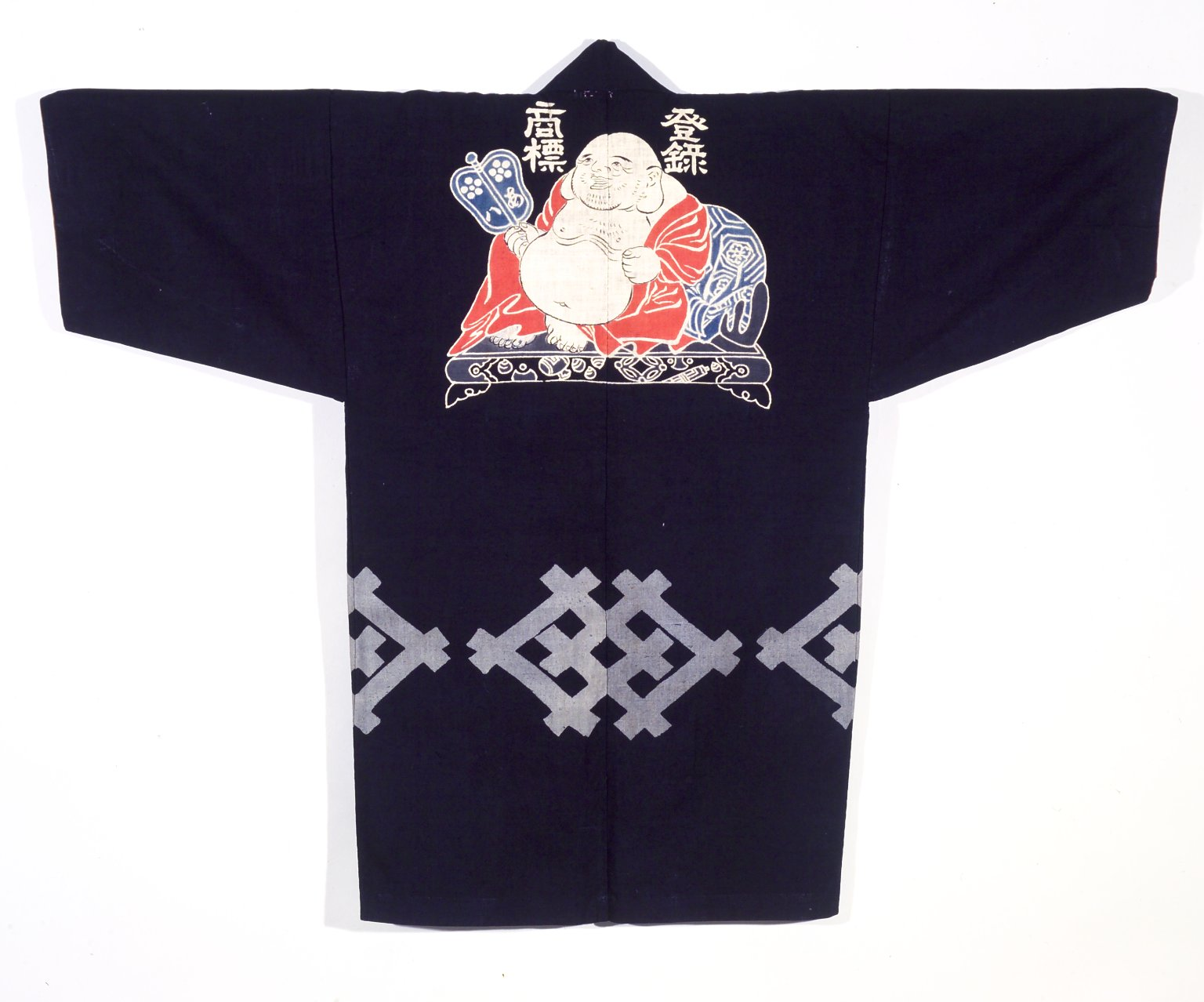
Workman's Livery Coat (Happi), late 19th-early 20th century. Brooklyn Museum

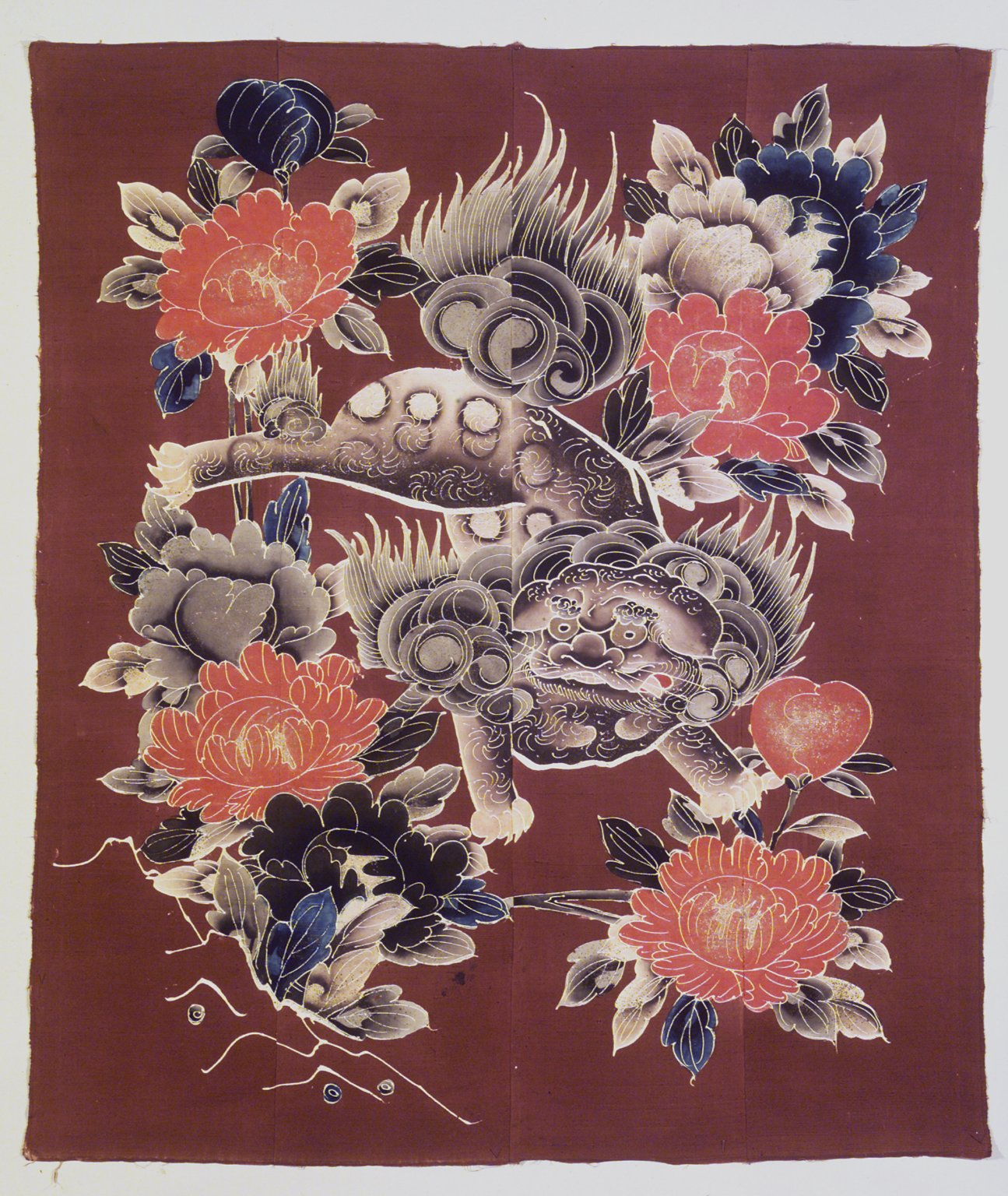
Futon-Gawa (Quilt Cover), early 20th century. Brooklyn Museum

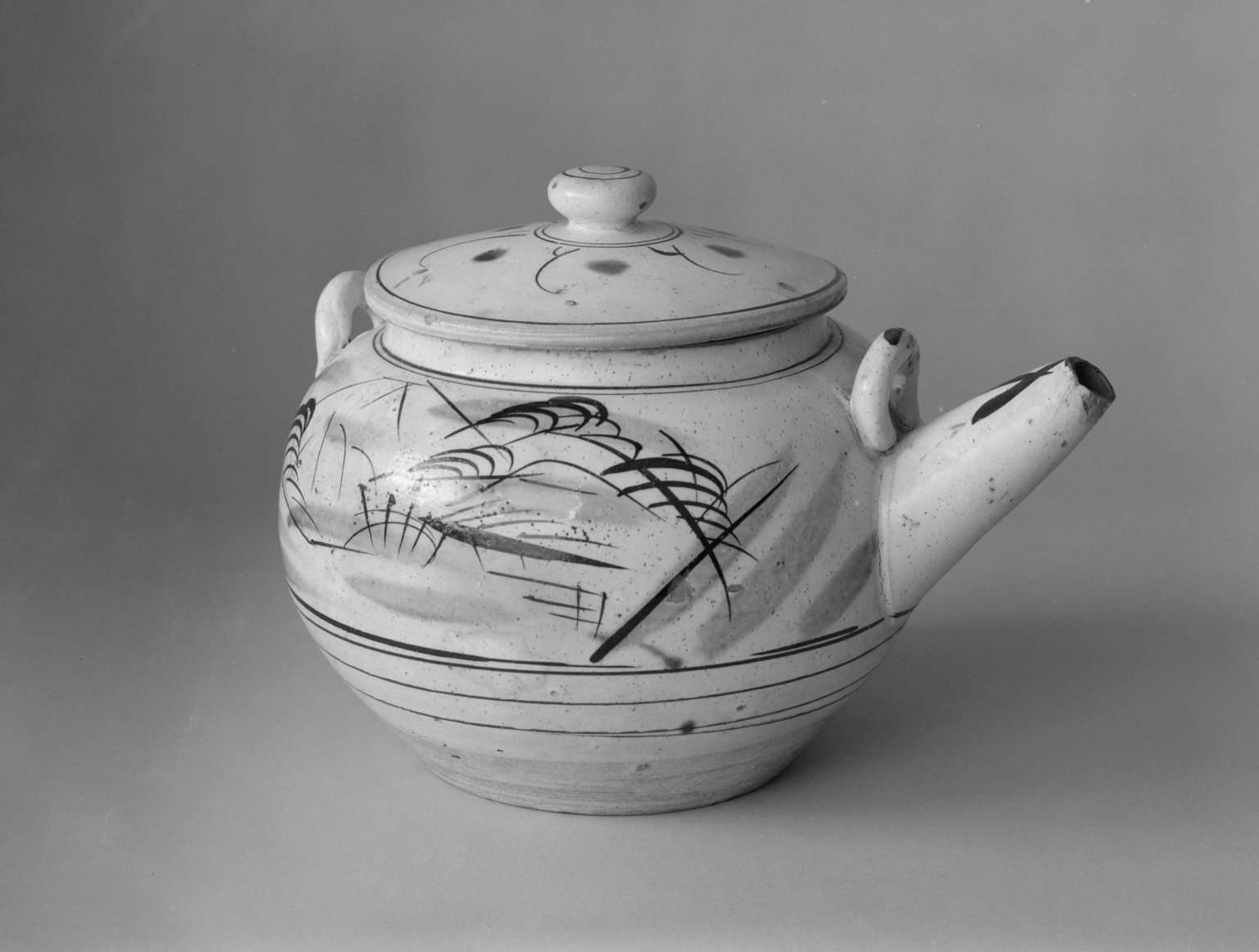
Ko-Mashiko Ware Mado-e Dobin "Window Picture" Teapot, ca. 1915-35. Brooklyn Museum

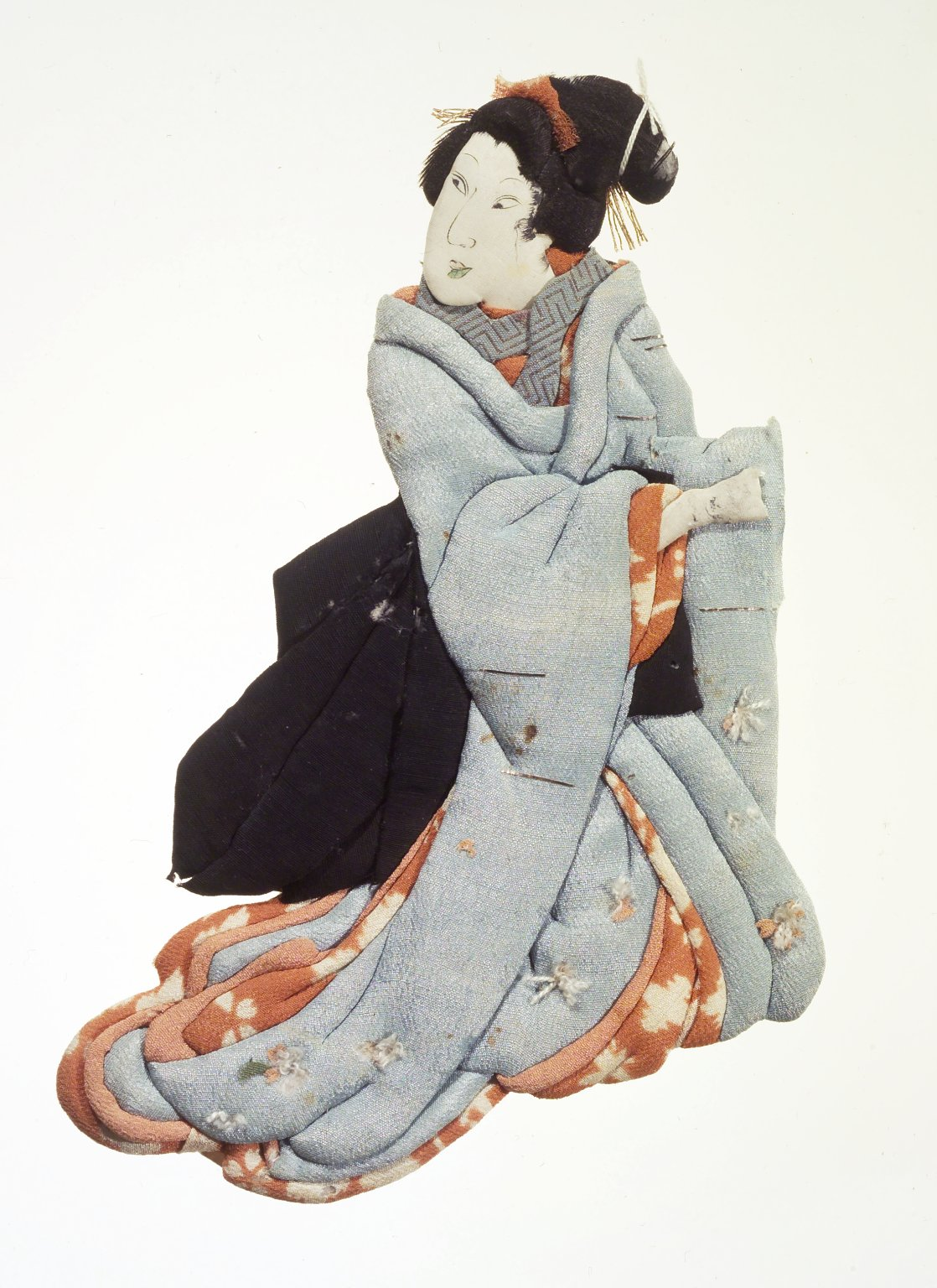
Oshi-e ("Push Picture"), A Geisha (Female Entertainer), 19th century. Brooklyn Museum

== See also ==
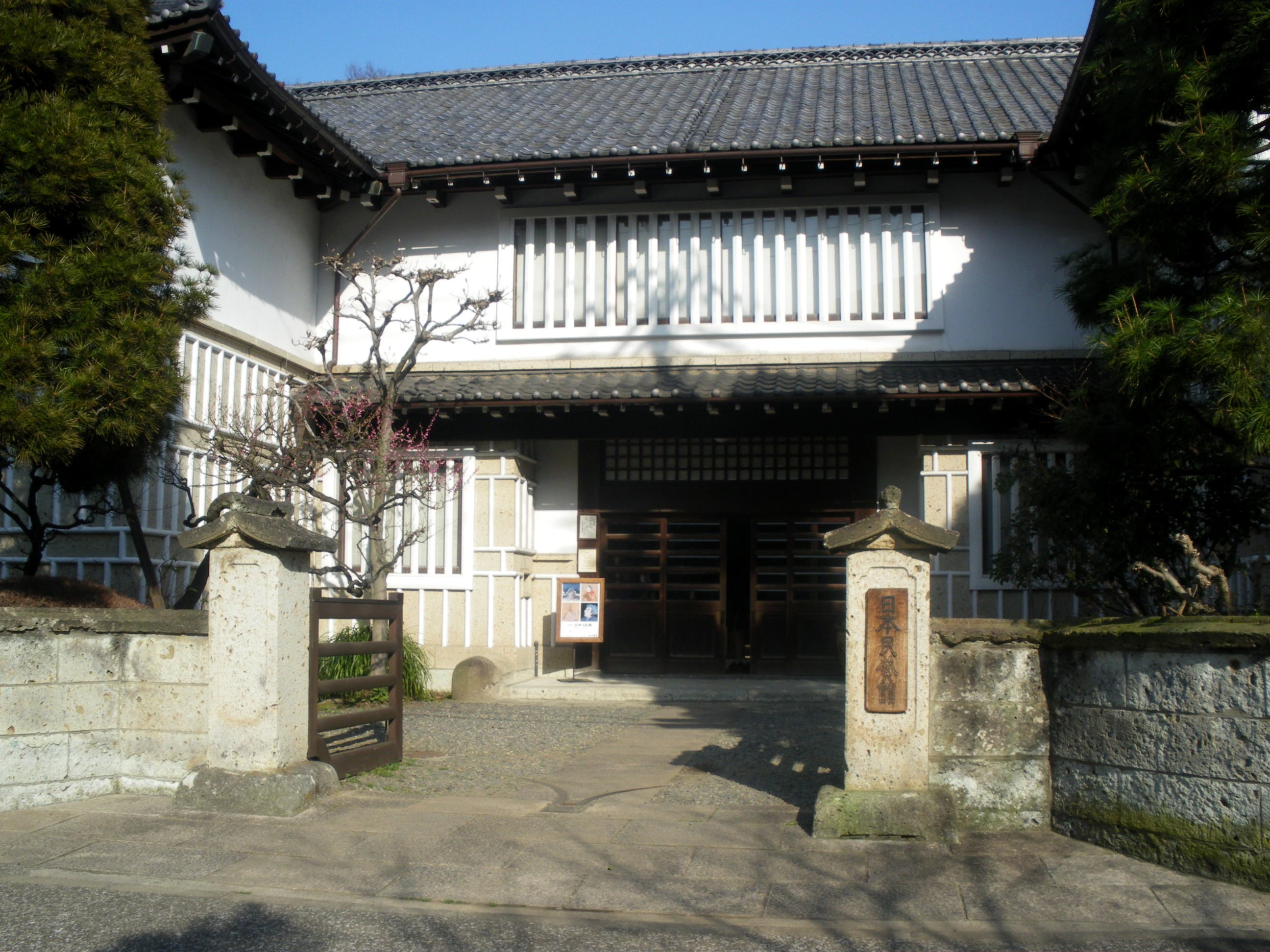
Japanese Folk Crafts Museum in Tokyo

- Japanese Folk Crafts Museum
- Mingei International Museum
