= Tachikichi =

Company in Kyoto city, Japan

Tachikichi Corporation
- Native name: 株式会社たち吉
- Industry: Wholesale and retail of Japanese and Western tableware
- Founded: 1752
- Headquarters: 21 Tachiuri Higashi-cho, Shijo-dori Tominokoji Kado, Shimogyo-ku, Kyoto, Japan
- Website: https://www.tachikichi.co.jp/en/

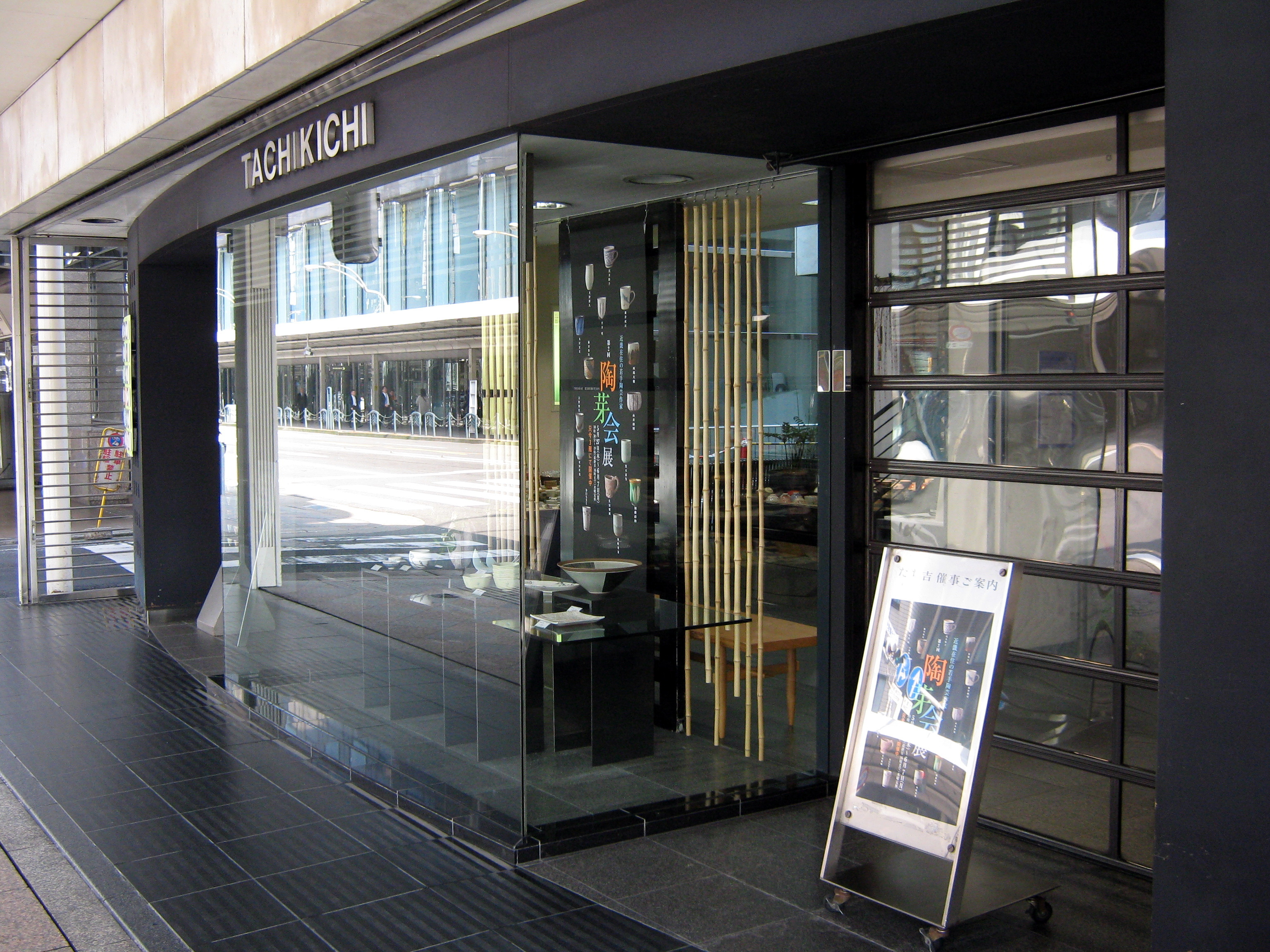
Tachikichi entrance

Tachikichi Corporation (株式会社たち吉 かぶしきがいしゃたちきち kabushiki-gaisha tachikichi) is a Japanese pottery and porcelain manufacturer and seller with more than 260 years of history. Its headquarters are located in the Shimogyō-ku ward of Kyoto.

== History ==
The company was first founded in the center of Kyoto in 1752 (Edo period), under the name of Tachibana-ya Kichibee (橘屋吉兵衛), in the vicinity of the intersection of Shijō and Tominokoji streets. In 1894, its 8th generation owner changed the business name to Tachikichi.

Its products, in particular as gifts, enjoyed great popularity, reaching sales of more than 20 billion yen during the Japanese asset price bubble period. However, in the period after the bubble collapsed the company experienced financial difficulties, due to a decline in sales of luxury products and pressure from cheaper products from abroad.

== Present day ==
The company continues to be a retailer of modern and traditional Japanese pottery and porcelain. In February 2015 the company joined under the umbrella of major investment fund New Horizon Capital. It was reported that the fund would invest approximately 1 billion yen to revitalize the administration and help preserve the legacy of a long standing traditional business.
