= Ando, Nara =

Ando 安堵町
- Town
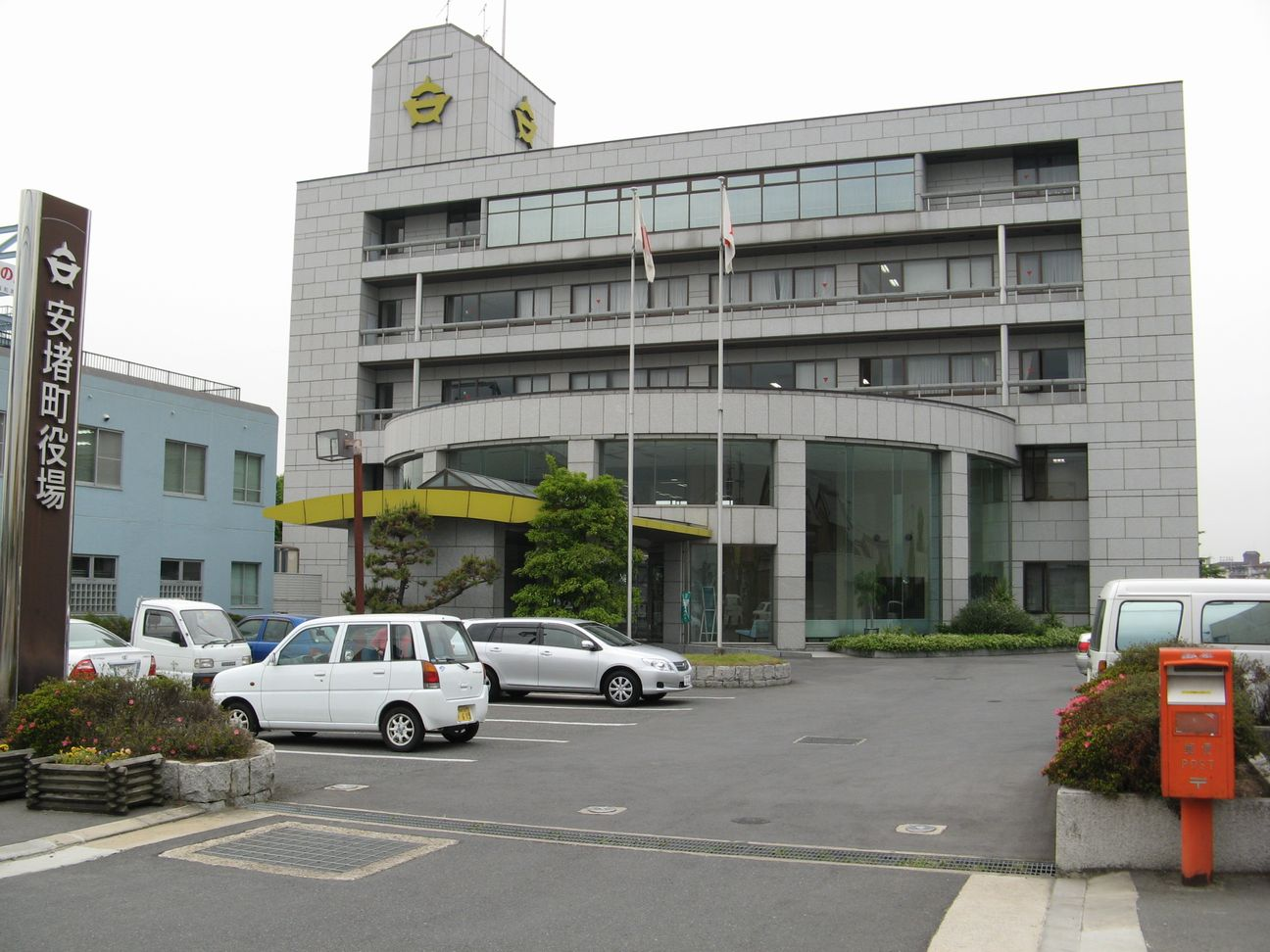
- Ando Town Hall

- Flag Emblem
- Interactive map of Ando
- Location in Japan
- Coordinates: 34°36′23″N 135°45′24″E
- Country: Japan
- Region: Kansai
- Prefecture: Nara
- District: Ikoma

Area
  - Total: 4.31 km^{2} (1.66 sq mi)

Population (December 1, 2024)
  - Total: 6,962
  - Density: 1,620/km^{2} (4,180/sq mi)
- Time zone: UTC+09:00 (JST)
- City hall address: 958 Higashi-ando, Ando-chō, Ikoma-gun, Nara-ken 639-1095
- Website: Official website
- Symbols
- Flower: Dianthus
- Tree: Ilex integra

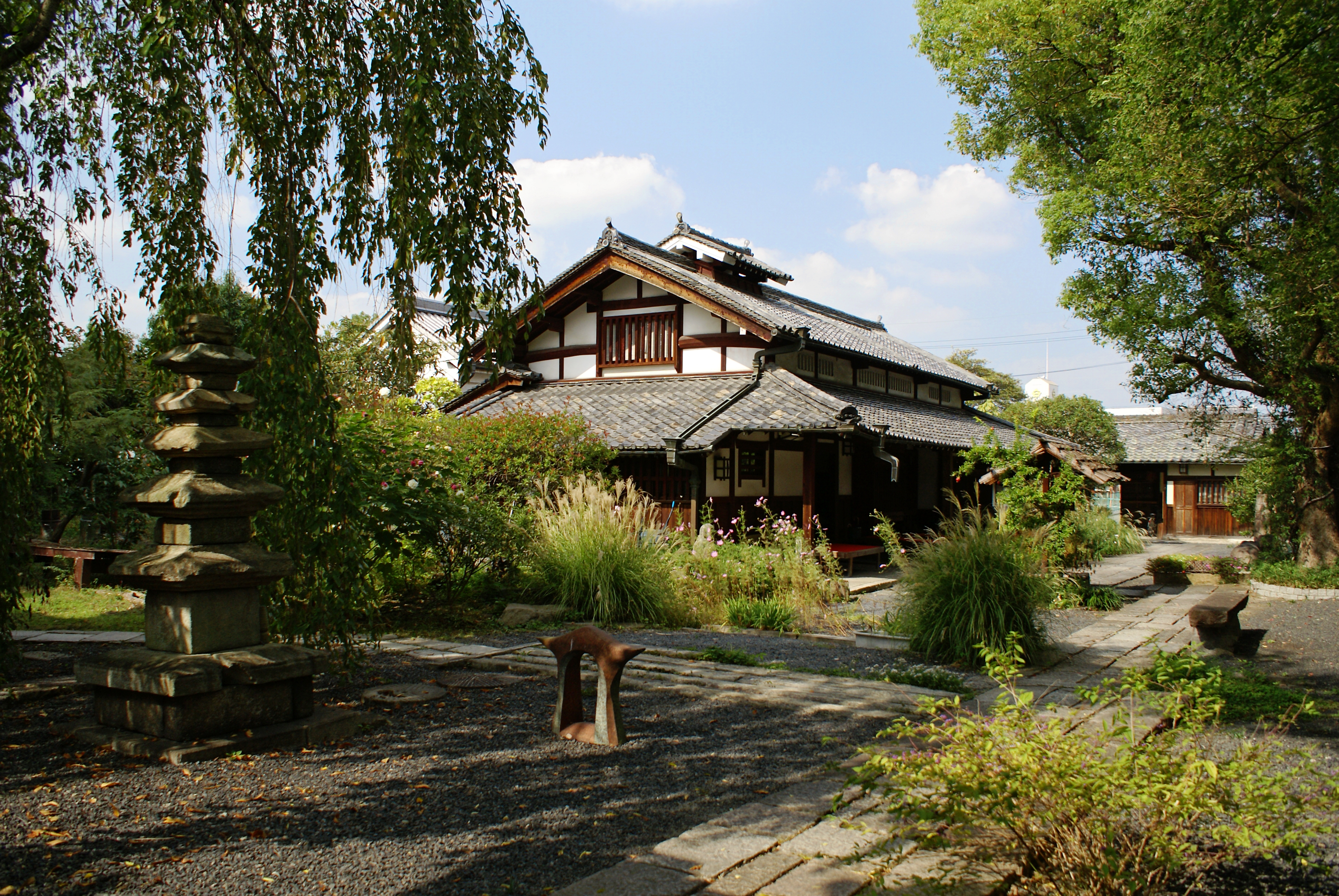
Kenkichi Tomimoto Memorial Museum

Ando (安堵町, Ando-chō) is a town located in Ikoma District, Nara Prefecture, Japan. As of 1 December 2024, the town had an estimated population of 6,962 in 3584 households, and a population density of 1600 persons per km^{2}. The total area of the town is 4.31 km^{2} (1.66 sq mi).

== Geography ==
Located in the northwestern portion of Nara Prefecture, it is a relatively small town situated close to the center of the Nara Basin. The Tomio River and Yamato River flow through Ando.

=== Surrounding municipalities ===
Nara Prefecture

- Yamatokōriyama
- Okaruga
- Kawanishi
- Kawai

=== Climate ===
Ando has a humid subtropical climate (Köppen Cfa) characterized by warm summers and cool winters with light to no snowfall. The average annual temperature in Ando is 14.1 °C. The average annual rainfall is 1636 mm with September as the wettest month. The temperatures are highest on average in August, at around 26.1 °C, and lowest in January, at around 2.6 °C.

=== Demographics ===
Per Japanese census data, the population of Ando is as shown below

Historical population
Year	Pop.	±%
1940	3,862	—
1950	4,964	+28.5%
1960	4,809	−3.1%
1970	5,321	+10.6%
1980	6,459	+21.4%
1990	8,728	+35.1%
2000	8,539	−2.2%
2010	7,929	−7.1%
2020	7,225	−8.9%

== History ==
The area of Ando was part of ancient Yamato Province. The village of Ando was established on April 1, 1889, with the creation of the modern municipalities system. On September 30, 1986, Ando was elevated to town status.

== Government ==
Ando has a mayor-council form of government with a directly elected mayor and a unicameral town council of eight members. Ando, collectively with the other municipalities of Ikoma District, contributes two members to the Nara Prefectural Assembly. In terms of national politics, the town is part of the Nara 2nd district of the lower house of the Diet of Japan.

== Economy ==
The local economy is based on agriculture and light manufacturing.

== Education ==
Ando has one public elementary school and one public junior high schools operated by the town government. The town does not have a high school.

== Transportation ==
=== Railways ===
The West Japan Railway Company (JR West) Kansai Main Line (Yamatoji Line) runs through the town, but there is no train station. The nearest train station is Horyuji Station in neighboring Ikaruga.

=== Highways ===
- Nishi-Meihan Expressway

== Local attractions ==
- Ando Town Museum of History (安堵町歴史民俗資料館)
- Daidōkyō (大道教) Headquarters
- Tomimoto Kenkichi Memorial Museum
- Nakake House
