= Otake Chikuha =

Japanese painter

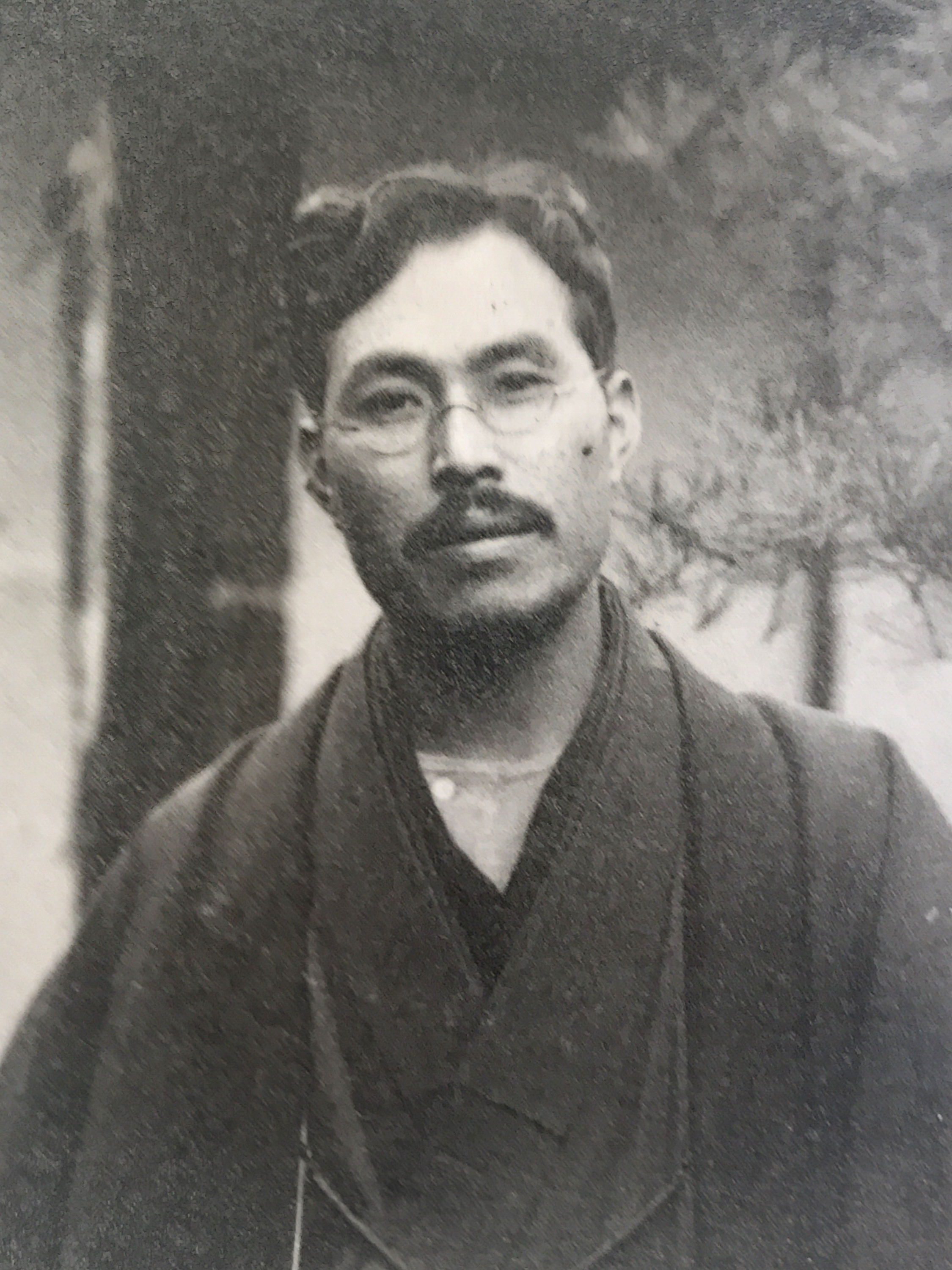
- Otake Chikuha, ca. 1915.
- Born: Otake Somekichi; January 11, 1878; Niigata, Niigata
- Died: June 2, 1936 (aged 58); Tokyo, Japan
- Known for: nihonga, ukiyo-e

Otake Chikuha (尾竹 竹坡; January 11, 1878 – June 2, 1936) was a Japanese painter. He was first known for his nihonga and ukiyo-e paintings. Although he was a praised figure at the height of his career, he later lost his reputation. He moved onto experimenting with more ambitious styles motivated by his anti-mainstream sentiments.

== Early life ==
Chikuha was born in Niigata City, Niigata Prefecture as Somekichi in 1878. His father Otake Kuramatsu was a dyer, who also painted under the name Otake Kokuseki. His two brothers, Etsudo and Kokkan both became proliferate painters, and the three of them came to be known as the Otake Brothers.

== Career ==
At the age of four, he learned nanga under Sasada Unseki, and received the pseudonym Chikuha. In 1891, he moved to Toyama where his older brother, Etsudo lived at the time. To make a living, he started working on images for newspapers, and preliminary sketches for medicine advertisements. In 1896, he moved to Tokyo following his younger brother Kokkan who left three years earlier, and became a disciple of Kawabata Gyokusho. He also learned yamato-e techniques of portraiture from Kobori Tomoto, bird-and-flower painting from Kajita Hanko, Kano school line drawing from Hashimoto Gaho.

He started sending his works to Kyoshinkai, biennial exhibitions hosted by Nihon Kaiga Kyokai and Inten hosted by Nihon Bijutsuin. Both of these institutions were led by Okakura Tenshin, an influential figure in developing Japanese modern art institutions. Through these submissions and subsequent attention by Tenshin, Chikuha made himself known in the field. However, in 1908, due to political differences among artist groups and movements, Chikuha left Tenshin in anger.

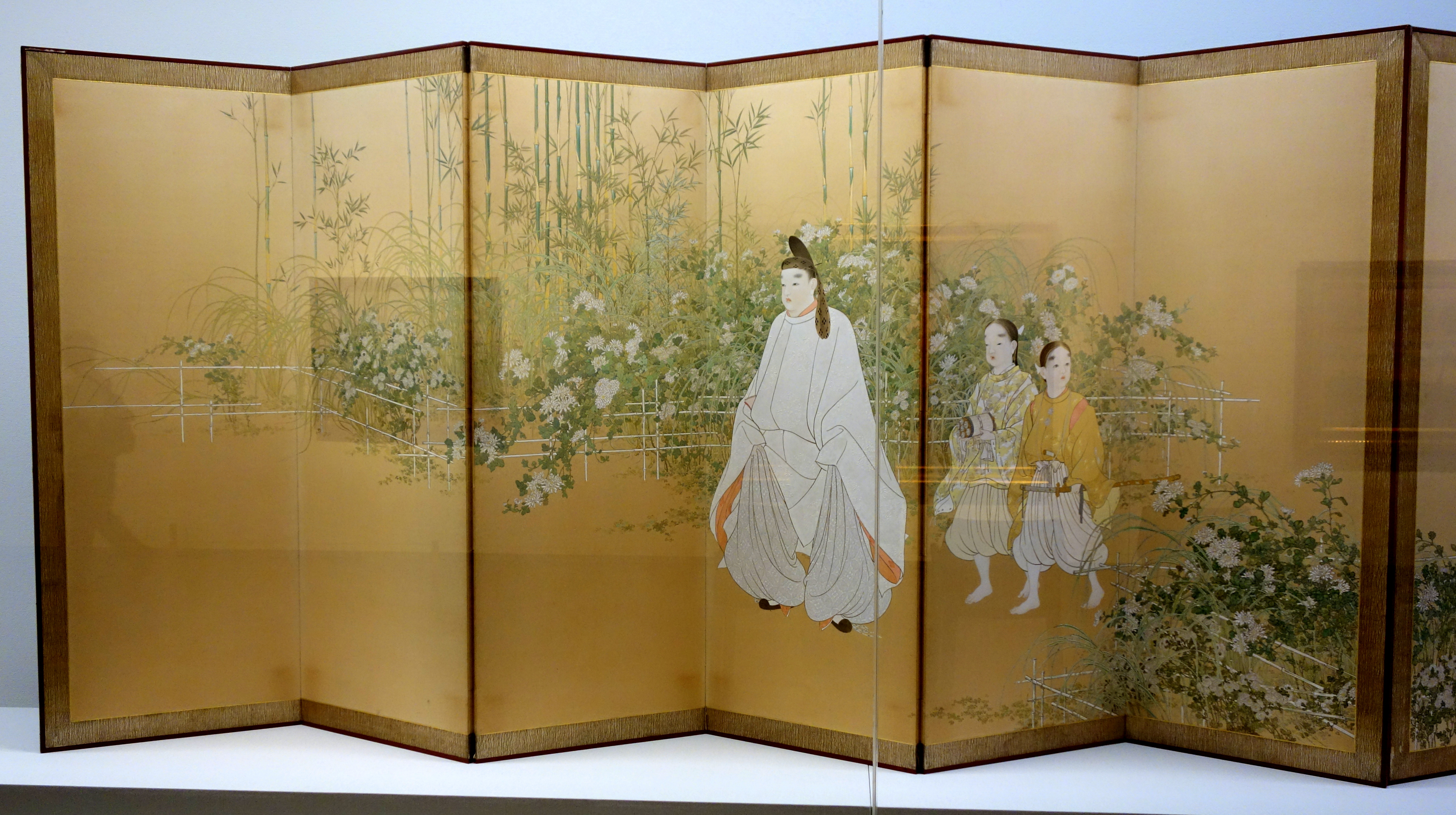
The Visit (Otodure) 1910, color on paper - National Museum of Modern Art, Tokyo

His leave from Tenshin marks the beginning of his most proliferate period, during which he produced his most famous works. This includes The Visit (Otodure), his most known work which won nito sho (highest prize) in Bunten in 1910 (currently at National Museum of Modern Art, Tokyo). He also won the santo sho (second highest prize) in 1909, nito sho in 1911. Although he continued to submit works to Bunten until 1918, he did not win any further awards. Due to his frustration, he decided to run for the general election in 1915, for a position in the House of Representatives. He did not get elected, and ended with much debt. It is this failure that lead him to decline in his later years.

In order to pay back his debt, Chikuha produced hundreds of Sun, on sea waves, which caused his reputation to decline in the artistic community. Despite this he kept painting artistically vigorous works, moving from detailed portraits and sceneries to vivid abstracts. Starting the winter of 1935, Chikuha suffered from bronchial asthma until he died at his home in Hongo, Tokyo on June 2 at the age of 59.

== Works ==
His works are in stored in many Japanese museums, including National Museum of Modern Art, Tokyo (Otodure (The Visit)), the Miyagi Museum of Art (Tsuki no Uruoi / Taiyo no Netsu / Hoshi no Tsumetasa). In particular, the Niigata Prefectural Museum of Modern Art owns more than twenty works including Aogiri.

In the United States, Museum of Fine Arts, Boston (Akan Genshirin (Akan Primeval Forest)) and Philadelphia Museum of Art (Rakujo (Fall of a Castle)) possess his works.
