= Tomimoto Kenkichi =

Japanese potter (1886–1963)

Tomimoto Kenkichi (富本憲吉; June 5, 1886 – June 8, 1963) was a Japanese potter and a Living National Treasure.

== Biography ==
His family came from Nara prefecture.

He received a commission to design a large Japanese-lacquered zelkova shelf called “kingin-sai kazari tsubo” for the Ume-no-Ma audience room of Tokyo Imperial Palace.

In November 1914, Tomimoto married Otake Kazue (also known as 'Kokichi'), a niece of the artist Otake Chikuha. Kazue was at one time a member of the feminist literary group Seito (publishers of the magazine of the same name, Bluestocking). A controversial figure in her youth, Kazue had a close relationship (and, it was thought, an infatuation) with Raicho Hiratsuka. It is thought that Tomimoto may have drawn an early draft of the woodblock print which Otake finished and submitted to Seito, which appeared as the cover of the 1913 New Year's issue of Seito magazine.

After marrying, the couple moved to Nara, Japan. Tomimoto and Kazue had three children together, but later separated.

== Honors ==
He was a recipient of the Order of Culture. He was also named a Living National Treasure.

The Tomimoto Kenkichi Memorial Museum was opened in 1974 in Ando, Nara. His work is also kept in several other museums worldwide, including the Gifu Prefectural Ceramics Museum, the Ohara Museum of Art, the Museum of Ceramic Art, Hyogo, the Museum of Fine Arts, Boston, the Cleveland Museum of Art, the University of Michigan Museum of Art, the Museum of Modern Art, Kamakura & Hayama, the Brooklyn Museum, the National Museum of Modern Art, Tokyo, the National Museum of Modern Art, Kyoto, the Asahi Beer Oyamazaki Villa Museum of Art, the Museum of New Zealand, the Artizon Museum, the Victoria and Albert Museum, and the National Museum of Asian Art.

== See also ==
- Seison Maeda
- Yokoyama Taikan
- Kaii Higashiyama
- Yasushi Sugiyama
- Imperial Household Artist
