= Ethical pot =

Trend in studio pottery

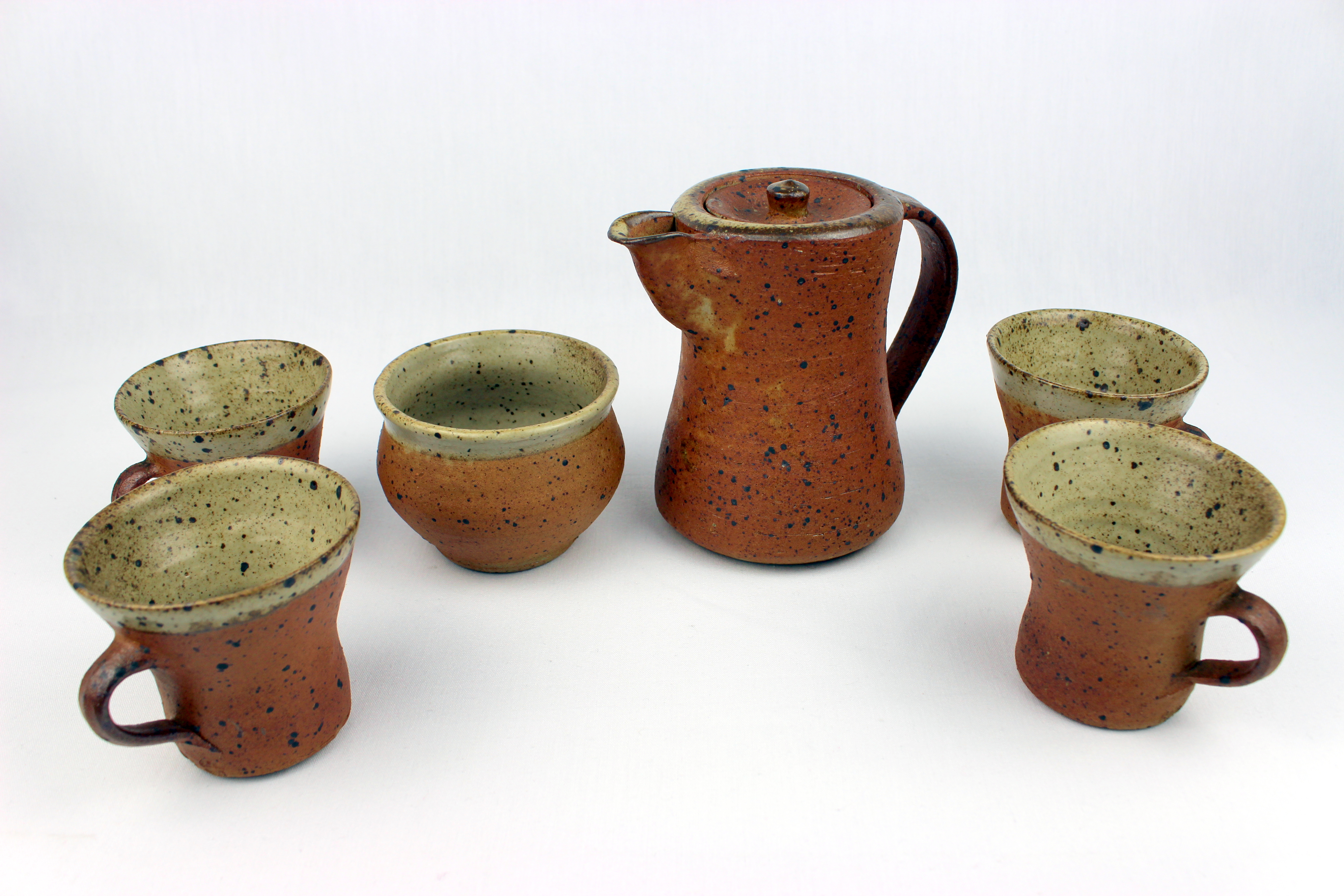
Ethical teaware by the Leach Pottery

The term "ethical pot" was coined by Oliver Watson in his book Studio Pottery: Twentieth Century British Ceramics in the Victoria and Albert Museum to describe a 20th-century trend in studio pottery that favoured plain, utilitarian ceramics. Watson said that the ethical pot "lovingly made in the correct way and with the correct attitude, would contain a spiritual and moral dimension". Its leading proponents were Bernard Leach and a more controversial group of post-war British studio potters. They were theoretically opposed to the expressive pots or fine art pots of potters such as William Staite Murray, Lucie Rie and Hans Coper.

The ethical pot theory and style was popularized by Bernard Leach in A Potter's Book (1940). He expanded the theories that ethical pots should be utilitarian, "naturally shaped" and originally derive from "oriental forms that transcended mere good looks". Leach had previously spent considerable time in Japan studying eastern crafts and mingei. His ethical pot idea was a rough interpretation of mingei for the western world; he advocated simplicity (ideally the best pots are so quick to make that they could be "thrown before breakfast"), and pots made to look natural and hand crafted. Soetsu Yanagi, a leading figure in the mingei movement, said that a craft object "must be made by an anonymous craftsman or woman and therefore unsigned; it must be functional, simple, and have no excess ornamentation; it must be one of many similar pieces and must be inexpensive; it must be unsophisticated; it must reflect the region it was made in; and it must be made by hand."

According to ceramic art critics of today, this pot style was intended to be modernist, useful, and "democratic in usage" as opposed to the fine art pot and also opposed to industrial art.

== Potters in the movement ==
The potters apprenticed to Bernard Leach include: Michael Cardew, Katherine Pleydell-Bouverie, Norah Braden, David Leach and Michael Leach (his sons), William Marshall, Kenneth Quick and Richard Batterham. His American apprentices included: Warren MacKenzie, Byron Temple, Clary Illian and Jeff Oestrich. He was a major influence on the leading New Zealand potter Len Castle, and they had worked together in the mid-1950s. Through his son David, Bernard was the main influence on the work of the Australian potter Ian Sprague.

== See also ==
- Studio pottery
- Mingei

== Sources ==
- Britt, John. Critical Ceramics: The "Unknown Craftsmen" is Dead. File retrieved February 10, 2007.
- de Waal, Edmund. A Ceramic History: Pioneering Definitions 1900-1940 The Studio Pot. File retrieved February 10, 2007.
- Leach, Bernard. A Potter’s Book, Faber and Faber, 1988. ISBN 0-571-04927-3
- Watson, Oliver. Studio Pottery: Twentieth Century British Ceramics in the Victoria and Albert Museum.
