= Richard Parker (potter) =

Richard John Parker (born Nelson, 1946) is a New Zealand potter who has been based in Kaeo for most of his career.

== Education and teaching career ==
Parker attended Nelson College from 1960 to 1964, and graduated from Christchurch Teachers Training College with a diploma in primary school teaching in 1966. Between 1967 and 1973 he taught at a number of schools around New Zealand.

== Ceramics career ==
In Nelson, Parker was exposed to the work of early studio potters including Harry Davis, May Davis, and Mirek Smisek.

In 1973 Parker attended a workshop run by potter Yvonne Rust in Northland, which prompted his decision to become a full-time potter. Through the rest of the 1970s he worked in Northland, producing domestic ware, until making the decision to focus solely on art pottery in 1979.

Like many New Zealand potters of the period, Parker's early work was influenced by Bernard Leach, Shoji Hamada and Soetsu Yanagi, but from the 1980s he developed an individual style.

He works in grogged terracotta covered with a local white slip. His techniques include coiling, cutting, press moulding, throwing and slab building, and he uses a lead glaze for brightness and iron and copper pigments. His most characteristic works are his signal plates (small round decorated plates designed to be hung in groups on the wall) and his Grecian urn-shaped vases, where the form is built by flattened coil construction in terracotta, then the exterior is slab-cut with wire; top openings are cut with wire in trefoil or quatrefoil shapes, giving glimpses of the unglazed terracotta interior, while the body is decorated in painted glazes. Craft historian Helen Schamroth writes:

In the mid 1980s he embarked on what would become his signature work. He took a very old idea – wire-cutting into a solid block of clay – and shaped his works as three-dimensional drawings with strong, winged silhouettes. The immediacy and audacity excited him, and the new works attracted considerable critical acclaim nationally and internationally. The wings of these pots are important features, often making reference to human form – playful, strongly defined, yet not macho.

In 1987 Parker received a Queen Elizabeth II Arts Council grant to be artist in residence at The Quarry arts centre in Whangarei, where he worked alongside artist Shona Rapira Davies. In 1992 he was one of 14 artists invited to make work for the New Zealand exhibition at Seville Expo '92; the exhibition was subsequently shown in Amsterdam and toured New Zealand as Treasures of the Underworld.

In 1995 Parker was commissioned by Malcolm Harrison to create an anchorstone, titled G8, for a large-scale installation in New Zealand's Parliament Buildings. In 2003 he was invited to demonstrate at the Second World Ceramic Biennale in Icheon, Korea, and in 2006 he was elected as a member of the International Academy of Ceramics, Geneva.

== Awards and recognitions ==
Parker was awarded the Premier award in the Portage Ceramic Awards in 2002. In 2011 he was recognised by Objectspace as their inaugural Master of Craft, with a touring survey exhibition and accompanying publication.

== Collections ==
Parker's work is held in collections throughout New Zealand and Australia, including The Dowse Art Museum, the Museum of New Zealand Te Papa Tongarewa, the Otago Museum, the Suter Art Gallery in Nelson, the Whangarei Art Museum and the Powerhouse Museum in Sydney.

== Further sources ==
Louise Guerin, Richard Parker, New Zealand Crafts 21, Winter 1987
