= Victor Anicet =

French visual artist and ceramist (1938–2026)

- Born: 18 April 1938; Le Marigot, Martinique
- Died: 26 October 2026 (aged 88)
- Known for: Visual artist, ceramist
- Notable work: Presence de L'Est Multiple (2011), La vision des vaincus (2014), Hommage aux Amèrindiens (1997), Stained glass, Co-Cathedral of Our Lady of Assumption, Saint-Pierre (2006)
- Website: http://ladoration.fr/vanicet/

Victor Anicet (18 April 1938 – 26 October 2026) was a French visual artist and ceramist.

== Life and career ==
=== Training and early career ===
Anicet trained as a ceramist initially at the Ecole des Arts Appliqués in Fort-de-France (academy of applied arts), continuing his training at Ecoles des Métiers des Arts de Paris (school of applied arts) in the ceramics department; at graduation in 1961, he was recognised as first in his class. After obtaining certification for a preparatory class for physics and chemistry applied to ceramics at the Arts et Métiers in Paris, he undertook numerous training courses in Europe: first in France, with potters such as Yves Mohy and Jean and Jacqueline Lerat at the École des Beaux-Arts de Bourges, then in England with John Reeve and Bernard Leach, at Michael Cardew's St Ives pottery and finally with Marion Mangold in Ottweiler, in Germany.

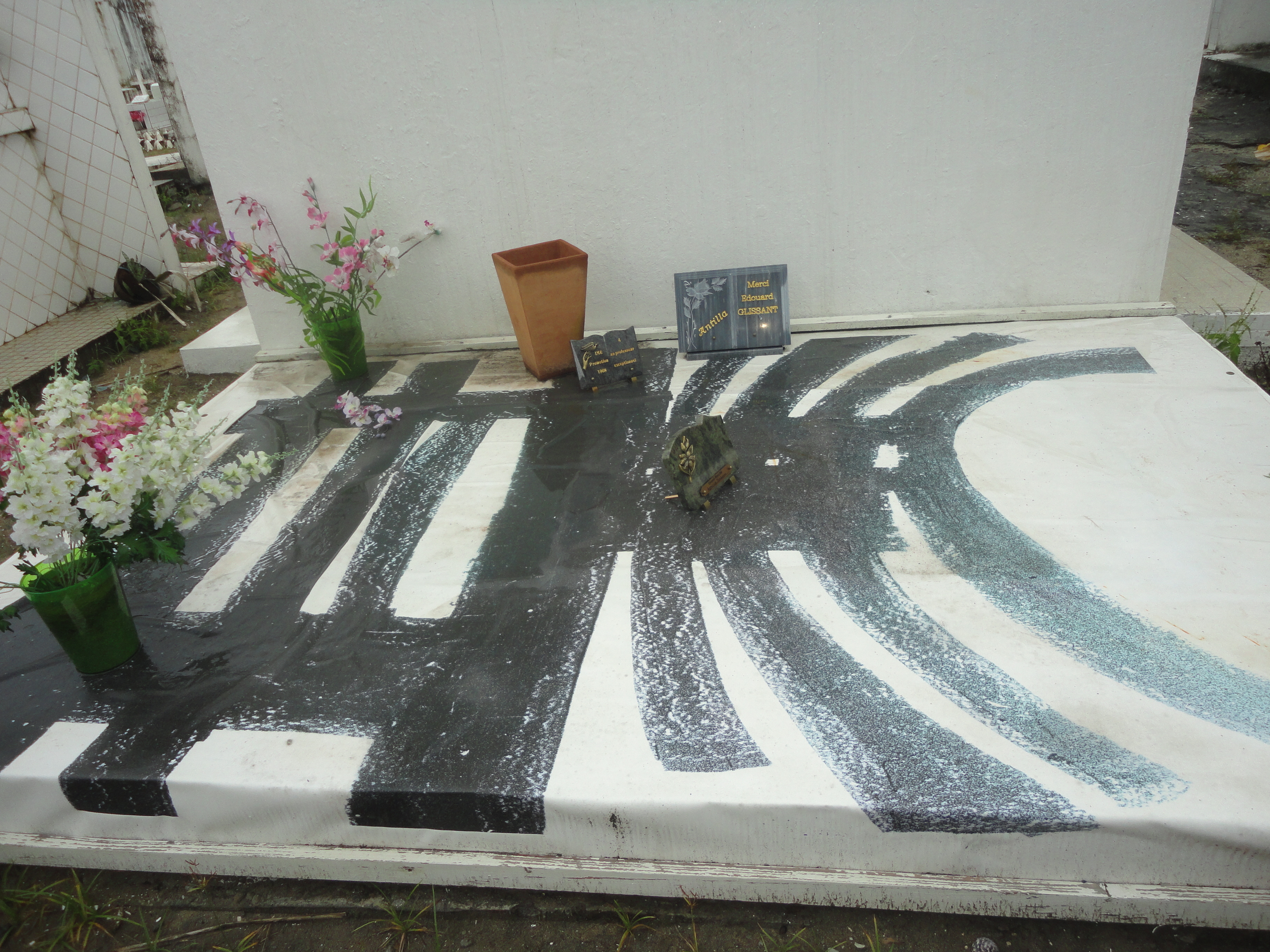
"Presence de L'Est Multiple", the tombstone Anicet created for his friend, Édouard Glissant.

=== Background and work in Martinique ===
His paintings evoke Maroons as people of courage and rebellion. He created objects that respond to Martinique and the history of the indigenous people of the island, which he explored at a young age with Rev. Pere Pinchon, co-founder of the International Association for Caribbean Archaeology and an initiator of archaeological research in Martinique. Assisting at a dig in the Adoration district in Le Marigot, Anicet learned about the ceramic culture of the Arawak by observing the fragments of pottery he was cleaning.

In 1984, he was a co-creator of the group "Fwomajé", the Creole for the kapok tree, which carries out research on Caribbean aesthetics. He has exhibited in France, the Caribbean, Germany and South Korea. In a collaboration with the Atelier Simon Marq, a studio in Reims, he created stained glass windows for the Co-Cathedral of Our Lady of Assumption, Saint-Pierre; the work was dedicated on 8 December 2006. He studied at the Petit Manoir College, located in Lamentin, Martinique, now named Lycée Polyvalent Victor Anicet.

=== Retrospective exhibitions ===
An exhibition of works selected from across Anicet's career was included in the 34th São Paulo Art Biennial and another, Sève, was held in tribute to his career in 2021 at Tropiques Atrium, an arts venue in Fort-de-France.

=== Death ===
Anicet died on 26 October 2026, aged 88.

== Filmography ==
- 2009 Victor Anicet, céramiste et artiste martiniquais
- 2015 La Vision du Vaincu
- 2015 Dans les jardins HSE installation de l'oeuvre de V. Anicet, May 2015
- 2016 ANICET Victor Animation murale au collège CASSIEN Sainte-Claire Martinique
- 2016 ANICET MUR DU MARIN
- 2017 L'oeil du lezard : Victor Anicet
- 2019 Le Palais du savoir - Yohann Guglielmetti
- 2020 Voeux pour 2020 de Franck Robine, Préfet de la Martinique
- 2021 SETANOU - 5 February 2021 - Victor Anicet
