= John Leach (studio potter) =

British ceramics artisan (1939–2021)

- Born: 1939
- Died: 29 August 2021 (aged 81–82)
- Resting place: Higher Ground Meadow, Corscombe
- Known for: Pottery
- Website: https://www.johnleachpottery.co.uk/

John Leach was a studio potter, the eldest son of David Leach and the eldest grandson of Bernard Leach. Born in St Ives in 1939, he studied under his grandfather and father at St Ives and under Ray Finch at Winchcombe. Leach left school in 1957 and worked with his father at Lowerdown Pottery Bovey Tracey, Devon and from 1961 to 1962 he was an apprentice at the Leach Pottery St Ives.

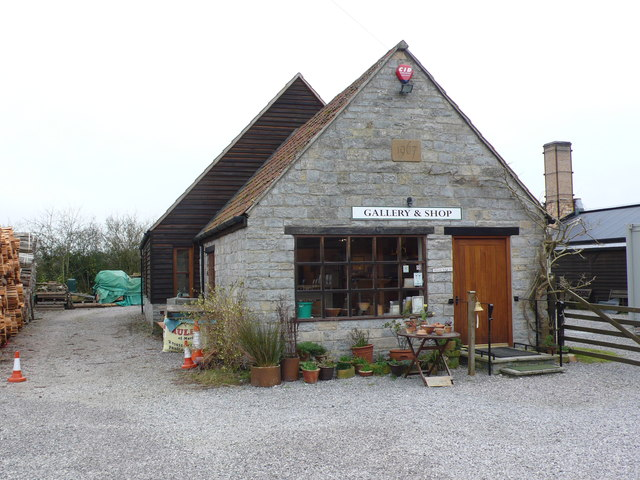
John Leach Pottery - geograph.org.uk - 3365255

He founded Muchelney Pottery on the Somerset Levels in 1964, and developed a range of pottery using local clay and wood to fuel the kiln.

The Victoria and Albert Museum in London holds a collection of his work and also the Worcester Art Museum USA. His work is also in the permanent collections of the Fitzwilliam Museum, the Ulster Museum, Belfast, the Tate St Ives and the National Museum of Wales.

He died 29 August 2021. His funeral was held on 1 October 2021 at Higher Ground Meadow near Corscombe.
