= Batterham =

Batterham is a surname. Notable people with the surname include:

- Genni Batterham (1955–1995), Australian film maker, artist, writer and activist
- Marijka Batterham, Australian statistician
- Rachel Batterham, British physician
- Richard Batterham (1936–2021), British potter
- Robin Batterham (born 1941), Australian chemical engineer
- Rod Batterham (born 1947), Australian rugby union player
