= Harry Davis (potter) =

Welsh-born New Zealand potter

Harry and May Davis after their arrival in New Zealand, August 1962

Harry Clemens Davis (20 November 1910 – 7 July 1986) was a Welsh-born New Zealand potter, and husband of May Davis.

== Biography ==
Harry Davis demonstrating in Sydney, 1972

Davis was born in Cardiff, Wales in 1910, the only child of a Swiss mother and English father. He was educated in Switzerland and England, and was fluent in German. After school he was sent to the Bournemouth School of Art where the pottery class was oversubscribed. Undaunted, he worked in the pottery room after hours, turning out large numbers of enormous pots which drew the attention of the headmaster. He was sent to Broadstone Potters, near Poole, which had been established in 1928 by Lancelot Cayley Shadwell and Mary Longbottom. Initially, he worked as a decorator, responsible for the "Joyous Pottery" range, but soon showed interest in all aspects of the craft. He came under the tutelage of a certain Mr. Bean who instructed him in the skills needed at a potter's wheel.

With the demise of Broadstone Potters in 1933, he applied for a job with the studio potter, Bernard Leach, and ended up working for him and David Leach at the Leach Pottery in St Ives, Cornwall. Davis acknowledged the invaluable experience he gained from Bernard Leach, especially for the honing of his aesthetic appreciation of ceramics. During this period he spent long hours in London museums, making copious notes and drawings of pots he found interesting.

He left St Ives in 1937 to become Head of the Art School at Achimota College on the Gold Coast (present-day Ghana). Here he examined the feasibility of manufacturing tiles, bricks and pots. In London in 1938 he married May Davis, whom he had met at Leach Pottery, and she accompanied him on his return to Africa. The outbreak of World War II found May stuck in England and Harry in Africa. He remained until 1942, managing to find local sources of clay and glazes. Davis recommended that Michael Cardew succeed him.

In the interim May had joined the "Hutterian Society of Brothers" aka the Bruderhof Communities and moved to Paraguay, the only country willing to harbour a pacifist community such as theirs. Harry eventually joined her there towards the end of the war, but had trouble in accepting the group's way of life. Harry and May found themselves in nearby Asunción where Harry obtained work in a pipe and tile factory. Not long after they moved to Patagonia, and he found work with a china clay company.

Returning to England in 1946, they started up "Crowan Pottery", near Praze-An-Beeble in Cornwall, producing domestic ware. The fine appearance and strength of Crowan pots became legendary. Despite having managed the flourishing pottery for 16 years, the couple became restless. With the Cold War becoming ever more threatening, they chose to emigrate to New Zealand in 1962, arriving with four children and their apprentice, Stephen Carter. They founded the "Crewenna Pottery" at Wakapuaka near Nelson.

Wanderlust once more gripped them. Harry set off to Peru in 1972, with May following a year later. Here they spent eight years of their life building a pottery at Izcuchaca District, 9,500 feet high in the Andes. In 1979 May returned to New Zealand and Harry, in poor health, shortly after. He died at "Crewenna" in 1986.

Davis travelled widely, lecturing on pottery, and writing "The Potters Alternative" as well as an unpublished autobiography.
