= Charmian Johnson =

Canadian artist and potter (1939–2020)

- Born: 1939; Pouce Coupe, BC
- Died: July 20, 2020 (aged 80–81)
- Known for: artist and potter

Charmian Johnson (1939 – July 20, 2020) was a Canadian artist and potter based in Vancouver, British Columbia.

== Life and career ==
Charmian Johnson was born in Pouce Coupe, BC in 1939. She attended Delta Central School in Delta, BC then the University of British Columbia to study ceramics from 1967-69. She studied under Glenn Lewis and Mick Henry.

Johnson worked as a high school teacher in Creston, BC, as well as an elementary school teacher in West Vancouver, BC. In 1969, Johnson worked as a visiting professor in the Department of Fine Arts at the University of Saskatchewan. Following this, she became a regular guest lecturer at the University of British Columbia (UBC) in the Faculty of Education studio program from 1971-1977. Johnson left her position at UBC in 1977 and decided to dedicate herself to ceramics.

=== Artistic practice ===
Johnson began exhibiting her work in 1979. She primarily worked in the medium of ceramics and also worked with ink on paper drawings and painting. Having apprenticed with Glenn Lewis and Mick Henry during her graduate studies at UBC, her work is directly tied to their philosophies and linked to Bernard Leach and Japanese Pottery. Johnson went to St. Ives in 1978 where she researched, photographed, and catalogued the diverse collection at Leach Pottery. Her work was also influenced by Korean and Chinese ceramics, especially the glazing used in the Ming, Ying and Sung dynasties.

In addition to Britain, she travelled to Turkey, France, Morocco, and Malaysia for artistic research then returned to Canada and began making a series of stoneware gargoyles. Throughout the 1980s and '90s, she changed focus to the production of pots, large bowls, ikebana vases and small boxes. In an article about Charmian Johnson for the Potters Guild of BC, artist, writer and educator Amy Gogarty remarks, "Characterized by a fierce intelligence and dedication to her craft, Charmian Johnson produced some of the most beautiful ceramic works seen in this region. Her mastery of subtle glazes and clean, graceful forms ensures her place in the Canadian canon of ceramic art, but the true value of her legacy exceeds the material residue of her creative practice."

Johnson died on July 20, 2020.

== Exhibitions ==
=== Solo ===
In 1985 "An Exhibition of Bowls" was shown at The UBC Fine Arts Gallery in Vancouver, BC. In 1987 she had a show at the Terra Cotta Gallery in Vancouver, BC titled "The Gargoyle Factory Does Not Often Appear." This exhibition showcased her conceptual exploration of gargoyles. In 1989 her exhibition "Flora: Drawings by Charmian Johnson" was held at the Vancouver Art Gallery in Vancouver, BC. Johnson later showcased more of her drawings in 2018 in a group exhibition. Her last solo show was in 2002. "Temoku: Iron Rich Glazes in Canadian Use" was exhibited at the Canadian Clay and Glass Gallery in Waterloo, Ontario.

=== Group ===
Jonson's first documented show was "Charmian Johnson and Ron David" in 2002 at the Pendulum Gallery in Vancouver, BC. In 2003, Johnson continued to show her pottery in the group exhibition "Genius Loci" at The Clay and Glass Gallery in Waterloo, ON. This exhibition showed a variety of eclectic pieces made of clay, glass or enamel placed in unconventional locations. Johnson's worked played with images of the imagination, and included her gargoyles, which popped out of the gallery's dark corners. Johnson then went on to exhibit in 2004 at The Morris and Helen Belkin Art Gallery in Vancouver, BC). "Thrown" showed Johnson's bowls, vases, jars, cups, boxes, plates, saucers, tea pots, and oven dishes in varied colours, shapes and sizes. In total over one hundred of Charmian Johnson's ceramic pieces were featured. Her most recent group exhibition was in 2018. "Nature", held at Catriona Jeffries Gallery in Vancouver, BC, exhibited her ink on paper drawings of botanicals. Her many drawings were on the perimeter of the gallery. They were intricate, in black and white, and ranging in style from scientific illustration to graphic motif.

=== Curated ===
In 2004, Johnson contributed to the research of the exhibition, "Thrown" held at the Morris and Helen and Belkin Art Gallery and co-curated it with Lee Plested and Scott Watson. This exhibition featured over 600 ceramics (including her own) that were influenced by or during the Leachian pottery movement in England.
