= May Davis =

English-New Zealand potter

May Beatrice Davis
- Born: May Beatrice Scott; 30 March 1914; Manchester, England
- Died: 13 January 1995 (aged 80)
- Education: Leach Pottery, Cornwall
- Known for: Pottery
- Spouse: Harry Davis (m. 1938)

May Beatrice Davis (née Scott, 30 March 1914 – 13 January 1995) was an English-New Zealand potter.

== Biography ==
Born in Manchester, Lancashire, England in 1914, Davis studied at Salford Art School and was taught basic pottery skills by Muriel Bell. In 1936 she began working at Leach Pottery in Cornwall under David Leach, where she met Harry Davis. They married in London in 1938, and she joined him in Ghana, where he was employed by Crown Agents for the Colonies as Head of Art at Achimota College, Accra. In 1946, they established the Crowan Pottery in Cornwall.

They moved to Nelson, New Zealand, in 1962 and set up the Crewenna Pottery in nearby Wakapuaka. Between 1972 and 1979 they lived in Izcuchaca District, Peru, establishing a pottery workshop in a small community as part of an aid project. They returned to New Zealand in 1979.

== Collections ==
Their work is included in the collection of Museum of New Zealand Te Papa Tongarewa and the ceramic collection of Prifysgol Aberystwyth University in Wales.
