= Timothy Andrews =

Timothy or Tim Andrews may refer to:

- Tim Andrews (born 1983), NASCAR driver
- Tim Andrews (potter) (born 1960), English studio potter
- Timothy Andrews (general) (1794–1868), Irish-born, U.S. Army officer
- Timothy Andrews (cricketer) in 2011 ICC European T20 Championship Division Two
- Tim Andrews (born 1956), American businessman, president of the Tennessee Valley Railroad Museum

== See also ==
- Tim Andrew, director
