= John Reeve (potter) =

Canadian craft potter

- Born: 30 November 1929; Barrie, Ontario
- Died: 29 June 2012 (aged 82); Abiquiú, New Mexico
- Occupations: Artist, Potter and Teacher

John Reeve (30 November 1929 – 29 June 2012) was a Canadian studio potter.

== Biography ==
He grew up in Barrie Ontario, beginning his working life in his father's jewellery store, where he was expected to take on the business. He married Joyce Elliott in 1952, and their first child was born in 1954.

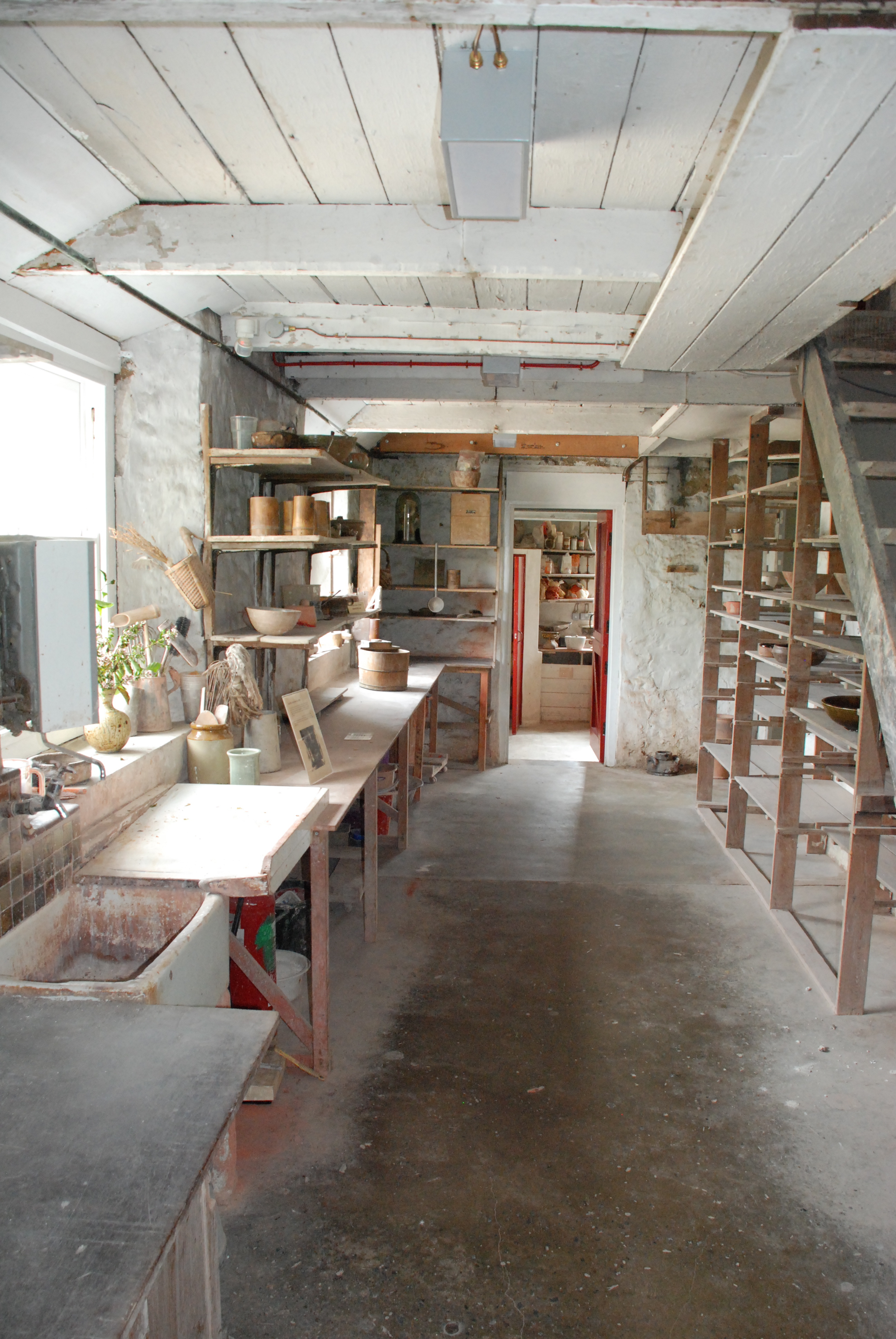
Interior of the Leach Pottery, St. Ives, Cornwall

=== Education and apprenticeship ===
John Reeve attended Vancouver School of Art between 1954 and 1956, studying drawing and ceramics. After his studies he travelled in Mexico before returning to Canada to open a pottery in Orillia, Ontario. The following year, he moved to England and took several ceramics courses, including Wenford Bridge pottery. Reeve apprenticed with Bernard Leach at his pottery in St Ives from 1958 until 1961. Other potters followed from Vancouver, beginning with Glenn Lewis, who he encouraged to apply. Apprentices made standard ware under supervision and eventually more experimental pieces in their spare time, reviewed in criticism sessions. In 1960, Reeve married his second wife, Donna Balma, later an artist known for visionary paintings based in British Columbia.

== Early and mid-career ==
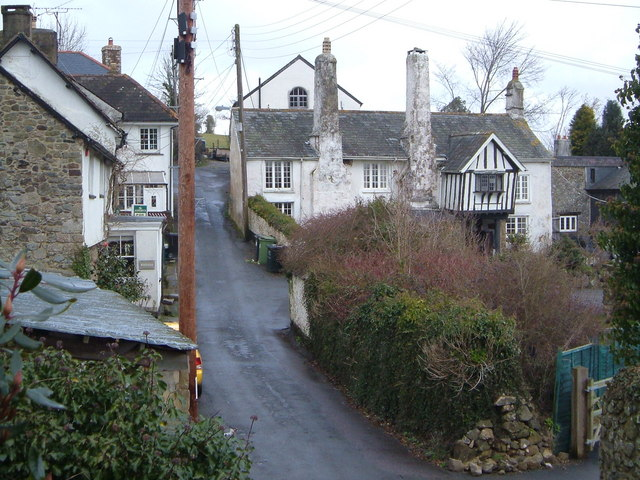
Longlands, at Hennock in Dartmoor, (building with tall chimneys).

He returned to Canada in 1961, teaching at University of British Columbia. Reeve gained the attention of architect Ron Thom, who commissioned him to make ceramics as part of the plan for Massey College. At around this time, he also met Warren Mackenzie and they became lifelong friends. Reeve would often work alongside him in his pottery in Stillwater, Minnesota. Mackenzie has said of Reeve, "We shared the idea that pots should be made easily and quickly; they should not be elaborate things. We didn't have to explain ourselves to one another. He was my best double." In 1963, he returned to the Leach pottery to make large standard ware pieces, and continued teaching, at Farnham College of Art in Surrey. In 1966, with the aid of a Canada Council Senior Arts Fellowship, he bought a farm named Longlands on Dartmoor, with Glenn Lewis and Warren Mackenzie. They established the Longlands pottery which continued to operate until 1972.

He was Studio Manager at the Bernard Leach pottery from 1973 to 1974.

== Later career and philosophy ==
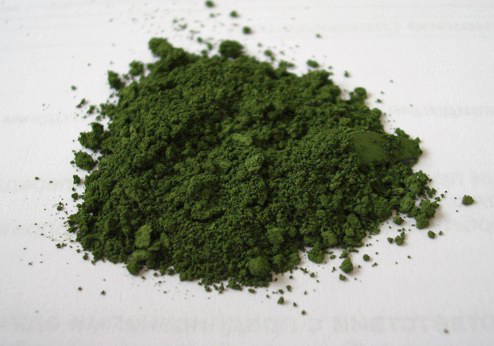
Chrome Oxide, used in Reeve's Green glaze.

From 1974, he worked and travelled across Canada and the United States. He became well known as a teacher through University courses, his workshops and as a visiting artist. About his approach, he wrote: "I'm not really interested in committing novelties on the world, but only making objects that have some hidden magic to them, which are good objects to use and therefore might make it better to drink coffee." This aim of making good objects for everyday use has been said to reflect the influence of Zen on his work, through his apprenticeship to Leach, and appreciation of the writings of Jack Kerouac and the philosopher D. T. Suzuki. He self-published two influential books on ceramic glazes: Book One: A Potter's Way to Understand Glazes and The Potter's Raw Materials, Some of their Characteristics and Compositions. Reeve also developed an innovative method for making porcelain in a studio pottery. He published this in "Some Notes on Porcelain", later republished in Pottery Quarterly (UK) and New Zealand Potter. "More Notes on Porcelain" followed in the journal Studio Pottery. Reeve's porcelain and Reeve's Green are well known to studio potters.

In 1992, he was a founding member of Santa Fe Clay, a pottery studio supplying ceramics to retail, which also runs a gallery and workshop program. He married his third wife Phylis Blair in 1996. In his later years, he continued to teach workshops at Santa Fe Clay, for example: "Jam-pots, garlic pigs, egg-bakers and other objects of delight". He also had a home studio in Abiquiú. In 2004, his work was part of a well-received major retrospective exhibition of West Coast potters, containing more than 700 pieces, shown at the Morris and Helen Belkin Art Gallery. Reeve contributed to a book of the same title published in 2011 and participated in its launch alongside Glenn Lewis, held at a gallery on Granville Island.

== Exhibitions and public collections ==
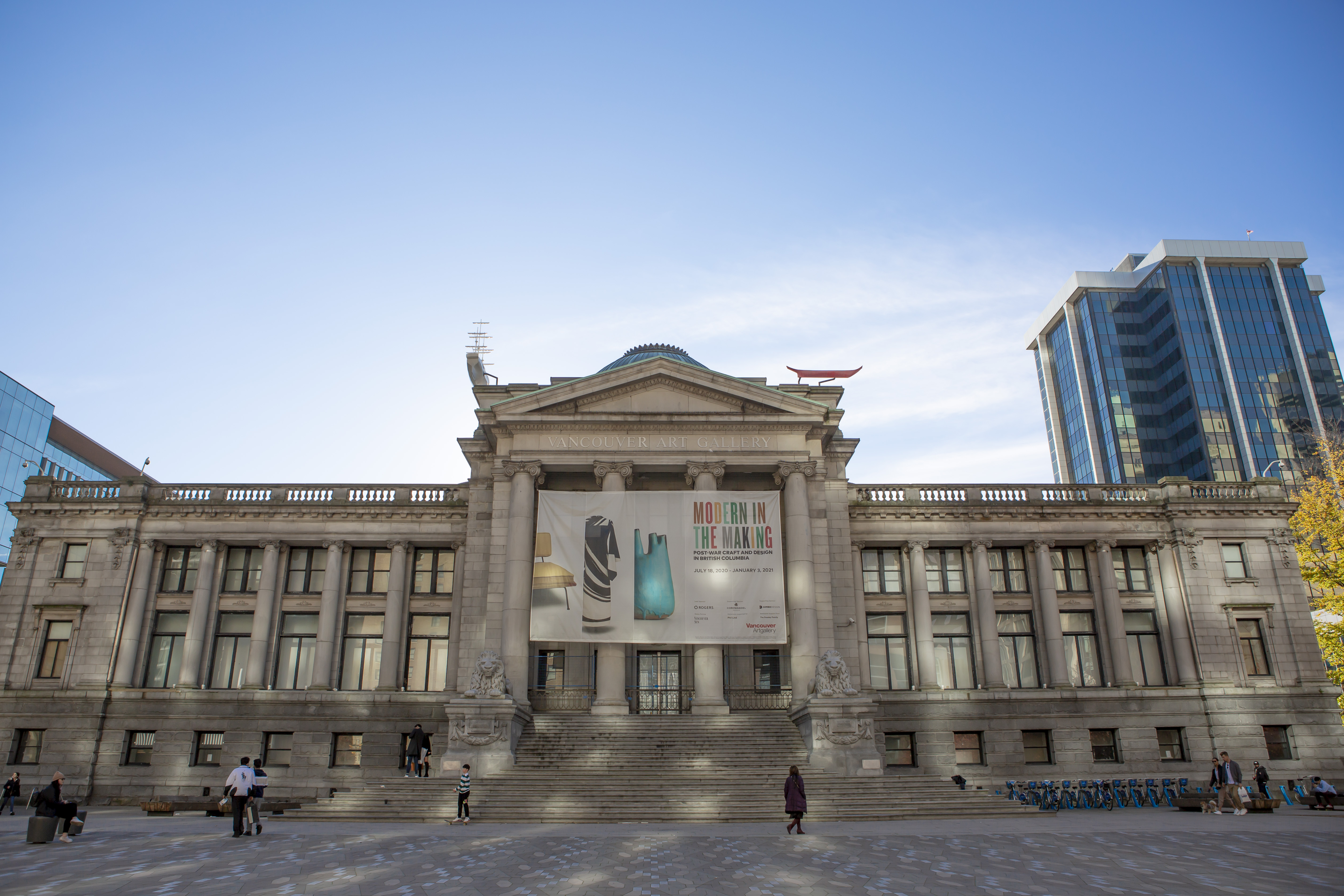
Vancouver Art Gallery, during Modern in the Making

A non-exhaustive list of exhibitions, and museums which hold his work:

- 1960s show at Primavera Gallery, London, United Kingdom
- 1972: Solo exhibition at the Vancouver Art Gallery.
- 2004: Thrown: Influences and Intentions of West Coast Potters, Morris and Helen Belkin Art Gallery, Vancouver
- 2013: Connections: Canadian and British Studio Ceramics, Gardiner Museum, Toronto, Ontario
- 2017: John Reeve: Some Hidden Magic Northern Clay Center, Vancouver

Morris and Helen Belkin Art Gallery

- 2017: Kindred Spirits, at the Lacoste Gallery in Concord, Massachusetts
- 2021: Modern in the Making, an exhibition about the development of Modernist design practice in British Columbia, Vancouver Art Gallery.
- Morris and Helen Belkin Art Gallery, Vancouver
- Weisman Art Museum, Minneapolis, Minnesota
- Museum of Anthropology, Vancouver, Canada
- York Museums, York, United Kingdom
- The City of Bristol's studio pottery collection, United Kingdom

== Potteries ==
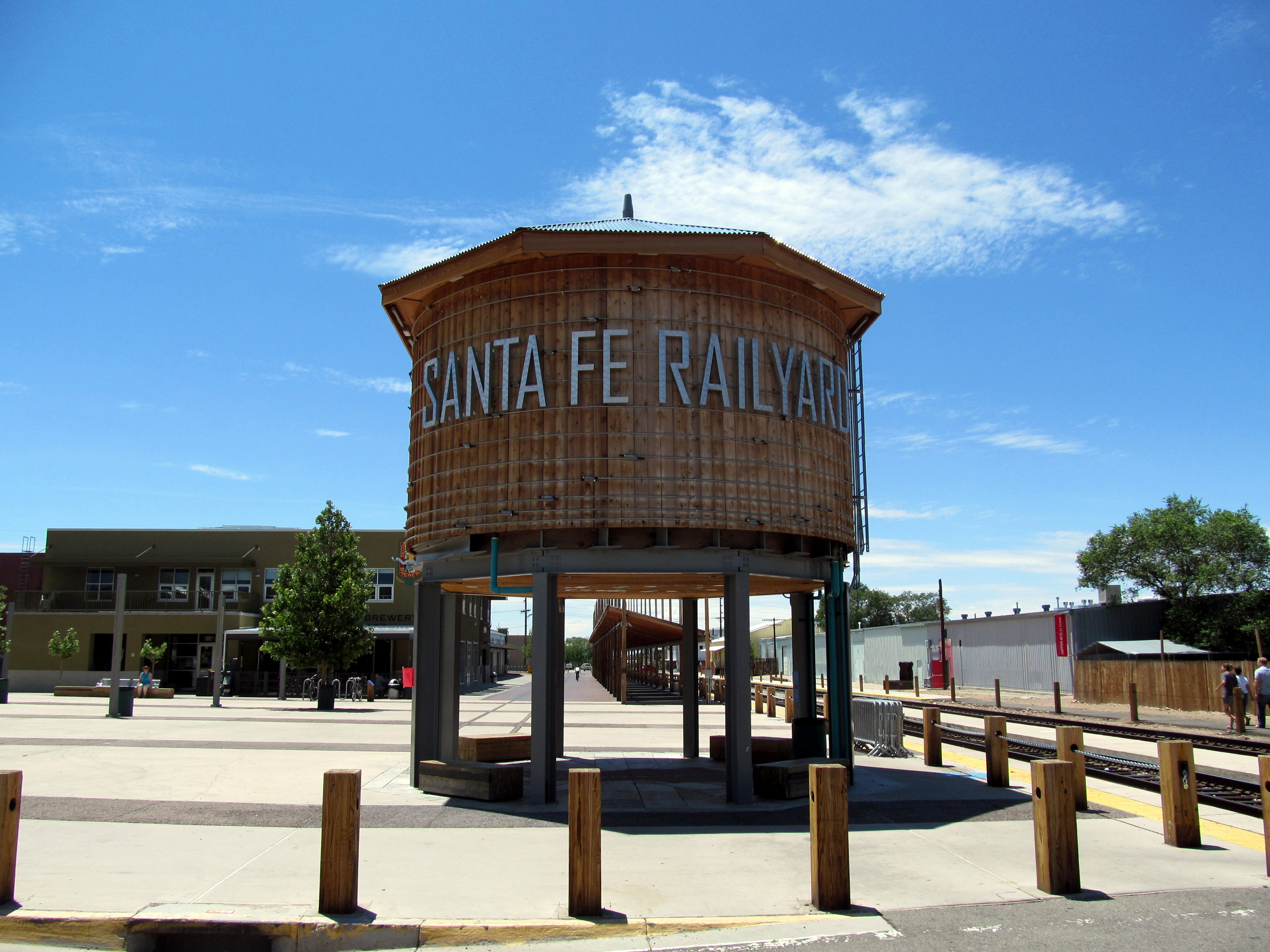
Santa Fe Railyard watertower in 2013 (Santa Fe Clay's red banner is bottom right)

Some of the potteries John Reeve owned, or worked at.

- Blue Mountain Craft Shop, Orillia, British Columbia, Canada (owner)
- Aylesford Pottery, Aylesford, United Kingdom
- Crowan Pottery, Cornwall, United Kingdom
- Wenford Bridge Pottery, St Breward, United Kingdom
- Leach Pottery, St Ives, Cornwall, United Kingdom
- Warren McKenzie's Stillwater Studio, Stillwater, Minnesota
- Longlands Pottery, Devon, United Kingdom (co-owner)
- Herman Venema Pottery, Matsqui, British Columbia, Canada
- Big Creek Pottery, Davenport, California
- Cold Mountain Pottery, Robert’s Creek, British Columbia (owner)
- Slug Pottery, Roberts Creek, British Columbia, Canada
- Tam Irving Pottery, Fisherman's Cove, British Columbia, Canada
- Lee Creek Pottery, Chase, British Columbia, Canada
- Old Bridge Street Pottery, Vancouver, British Columbia, Canada
- Tom Donahue Pottery, Oakview, California
- Jim Lorio Pottery, Boulder, Colorado
- Castle Clay, Denver, Colorado
- Santa Fe Clay, Santa Fe, New Mexico (co-founder)
- Martin Peters Dunbar Pottery, Vancouver, British Columbia, Canada
- Stephen Kilborn Pottery, Taos, New Mexico

== Recognition ==
- 1961 Leon and Thea Koerner Foundation Grant
- Canada Council Senior Arts Fellowship

== Published works ==
=== Books ===
- 1979: Book One : A Potter's Way to Understand Glazes
- The Potter's Raw Materials, Some of their Characteristics and Compositions
- Thrown: British Columbia’s Apprentices of Bernard Leach and their Contemporaries.

=== Articles ===
- 1975: The Potters Wheel. Ceramic Review - No. 33 (May / Jun 1975)
- 1975: Some Notes on Porcelain. (three part article) Tactile. Canadian Guild of Potters
  - Notes on Porcelain, Part 1: Miracle of Reality, Pottery Quarterly, Vol. 11, No., 43 (1975)
  - Notes on Porcelain, Part 2: The Body, Pottery Quarterly, Vol. 11, No., 44 (1975)
- 1978: More Notes on Porcelain. Studio Potter, Vol. 6 No. 2 (January 1978)

== See also ==
- On the road with John Reeve, a talk given at the 2017 NCECA Conference by Vancouver potter Nora Vaillant.
