= Richard Batterham =

British potter (1936–2021)

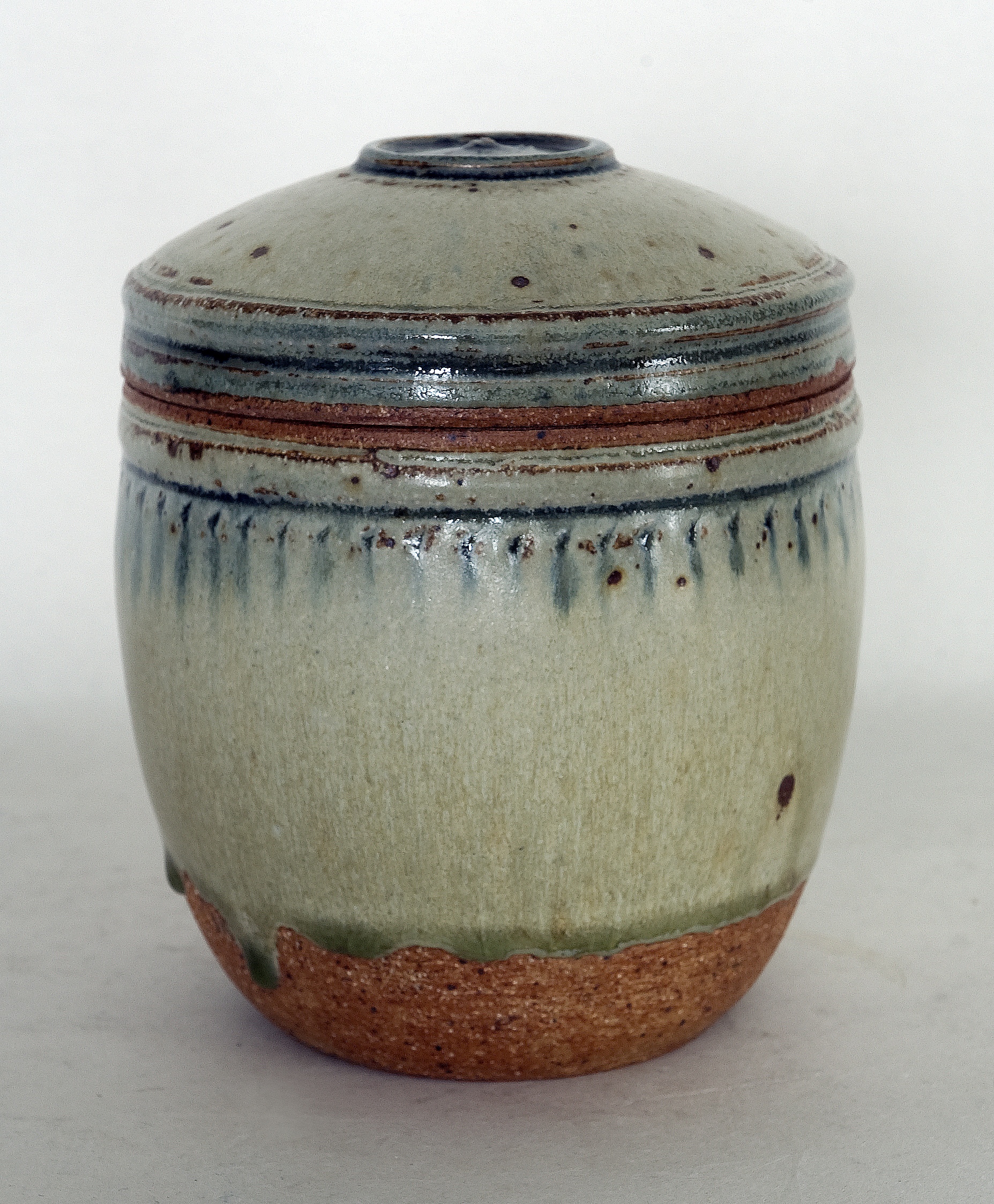
Thrown lidded jar by Richard Batterham

Richard Hugh Neville Batterham (27 March 1936 – 7 September 2021) was a British potter.

== Biography ==
Richard Batterham was born in Woking and attended Bryanston School in Dorset. He began making pottery there at the age of 13. His teacher was the sculptor Donald Potter, with whom he later formed a lifelong friendship. By the end of his school years in 1954, Batterham already knew that he wanted to become a potter. After his military service, he completed an apprenticeship with Bernard Leach in St Ives from 1957. It was there that he met his future wife Dinah Dunn. He also became friends with Atsuya Hamada, son of Shoji Hamada, from whom he took over the foot-operated Asian potter's wheel with which he worked from then on.

After marrying in 1959, Batterham and Dunn opened their pottery in Durweston, near Blandford Forum (Dorset). In 1966 the pottery was extended. Batterham worked there actively until the age of 82.

Batterham's work has been shown in numerous national and international exhibitions, including at the Landshut Ceramics School, Germany in 2008/2009.

A documentary film from his gallery entitled Richard Batterham, Master Potter was released in 2017. In 2019, another documentary short film with a similar focus was released.

Batterham died on 7 September 2021 at his home in Durweston.

== Style ==
Batterham worked in the tradition of Bernard Leach and Shoji Hamada, for whom the term ethical pot was later coined and whose approach was in turn rooted in the Japanese Mingei movement. The ideal of this movement was the anonymous craftsman who quickly and dynamically produces ceramics for everyday use and in this way creates art without aiming to do so. Consequently, Batterham refrained from signing his vessels. He himself saw his work primarily in the tradition of Michael Cardew, the first apprentice of Bernard Leach.

Batterham deliberately focussed on a comparatively small range - mainly objects for everyday use - and worked throughout his life on perfecting the shapes and surfaces of these objects. He developed a characteristic style that simply made it unnecessary to sign his works. He worked largely alone and produced his clay bodies and glazes himself.

== Bibliography ==
- Franz Nierhoff: Richard Batterham: Töpfer/Potter. Landshut 2008.
- Anna Powell: Richard Batterham at 80. West Bay 2016.
- Tanya Harrod [Hg.]: Richard Batterham: Studio Potter. London 2022.
