= William Marshall (potter) =

English studio potter

- Born: 21 July 1923; St Ives, Cornwall, England
- Died: 5 May 2007 (aged 83)
- Known for: Pottery
- Style: Abstract

William "Bill" Marshall (21 July 1923 – 5 May 2007) was an English studio potter, known for his Japan-influenced style.

== Early life ==
Marshall was born in St Ives, Cornwall, the youngest of four children. His father was a chief steward for the Great Western Railway and his mother was institutionalised from illness when he was two years old. From then on, he was raised by his grandmother and her second husband in nearby Halsetown. His cousin Kenneth Quick was also a potter, and his grandfather was a silversmith.

At the age of seven, he developed a tuberculosis illness in his legs, and he became exceptionally thin and missed large amounts of schooling. He became the first local apprentice at St Ives' Leach Pottery at the age of 14, picked by Bernard Leach's son David due to his enthusiasm and despite his physical weakness.

== Career ==
While he was initially registered as an "essential worker", Marshall was conscripted for World War II in 1942 and joined the Royal Artillery. He landed on Juno Beach during the Normandy landings and supported Canadian troops. He was then stationed in Elbe in Germany, and finally returned to St Ives in 1947 following an almost fatal period of illness.

Back at the Leach Pottery, he began to throw larger and more complex pots, becoming its foreman. Marshall began developing his own style of pottery, inspired by his interpretation: unlike his mentor Leach, he never visited the country and instead learned about potters like Kitaoji Rosanjin from conversations and stories. He made friends with Shoji Hamada, and both their influence can be seen in the abstract style of his decoration.

By the 1960s, Marshall's strong and simple style had been firmly established: he used his oriental, English and North American influences to evoke the spirit of the Cornish coastal landscape. He left the Leach Pottery in 1977 to start his own workshop in Lelant, and taught a college in Redruth until the mid-1980s.

Marshall exhibited across the world, showing at the Penwith Society of Arts, Rotterdam's Boymans Museum, and various Arts Council travelling shows. His work would later be acquired by the Victoria and Albert Museum, and the University of Warwick.

== Personal life ==
He married his wife Marjorie in 1951, and they had a daughter, Jill and a son, Andrew. He became a potter and assisted his father at his Lelant pottery.

== Gallery of works ==
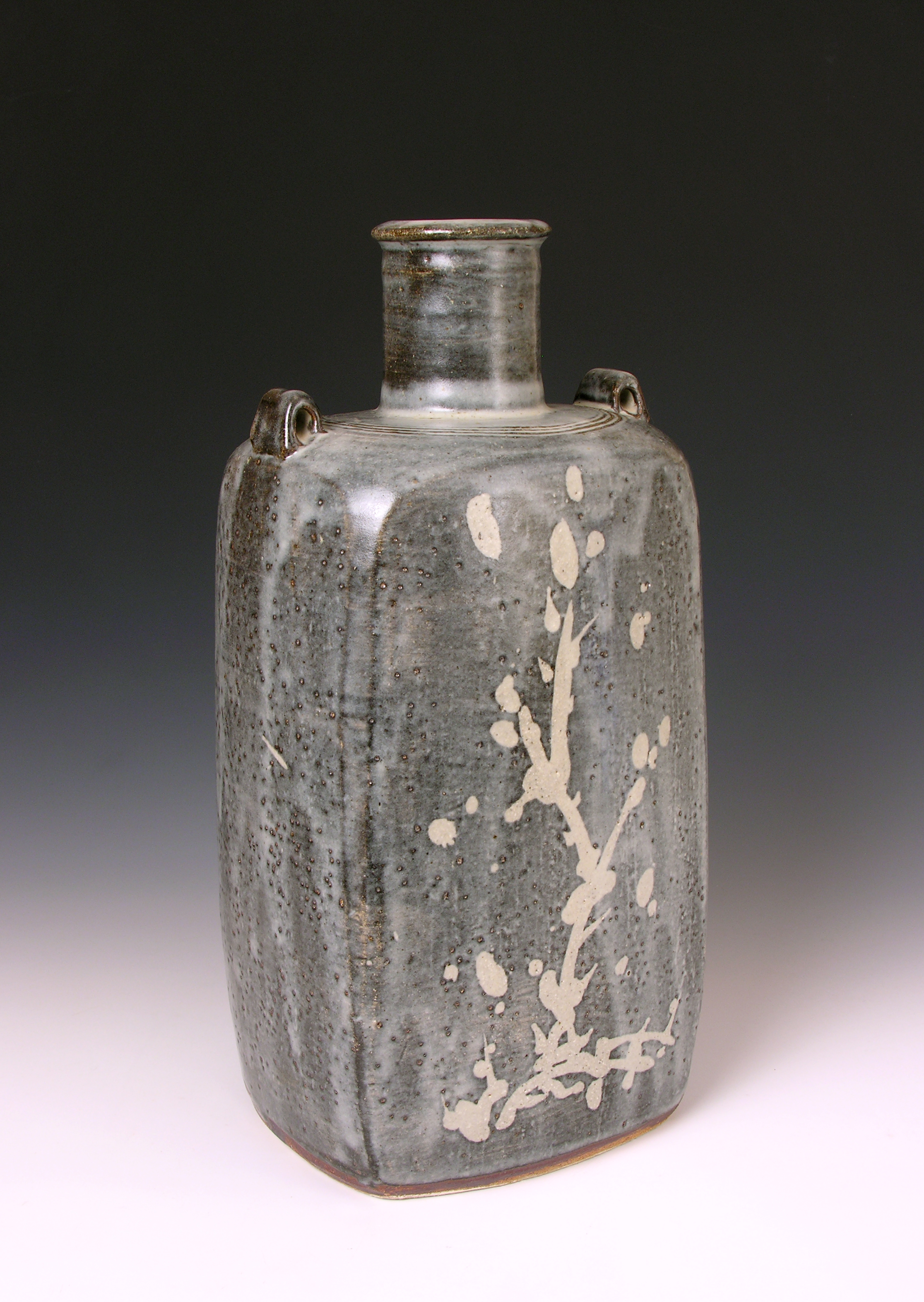
Squared Bottle made by Bill Marshall, c. 1990
