= Nirmala Patwardhan =

- Nirmala Patwardhan at the wheel
- Born: 1928; Hyderabad, Sindh
- Died: 2008 (aged 79–80)
- Known for: Ceramics

Nirmala Patwardhan (1928–2008) was an eminent ceramic artist from India. Born in Hyderabad, Sindh, she grew up in Japan and studied art under Nandalal Bose at Santiniketan before working with Ulrich Gunther at Stuttgart, Ray Finch and Bernard Leach in the United Kingdom. Her landmark works include a Handbook for Potters (with a second edition New Handbook for Potters) and the rediscovery and development of a glaze known as the "Nirmala Chun Glaze" which was based on a Chinese technique developed in the 11th Century.
