= Janet Leach =

American studio potter

Janet Darnell Leach (15 March 1918 – 12 September 1997), was an American studio potter working in later life at the Leach Pottery in St Ives, Cornwall in England. After studying pottery at Black Mountain, North Carolina under Shoji Hamada, a visiting artisan, she traveled to Japan to work with him. She studied with him for two years and always considered him to be her principal mentor. She was the first foreign woman to study pottery in Japan and only the second westerner.

After returning to the US from Japan, in 1955 she married Bernard Leach, the noted British studio potter, whom she had earlier studied with. They returned to Great Britain to operate his studio at St. Ives. Janet Leach continued to be influenced by Japanese aesthetics in her pottery and ceramics, and her work has increased in popularity. In 2006-2007 there was a major retrospective of her work at Tate St Ives.

== Life ==
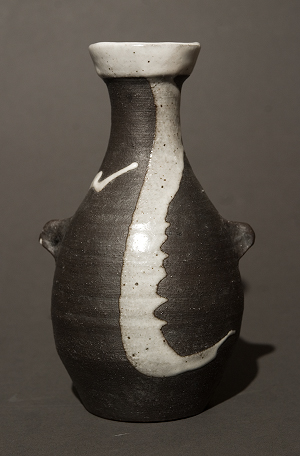
Small vase by Janet Leach

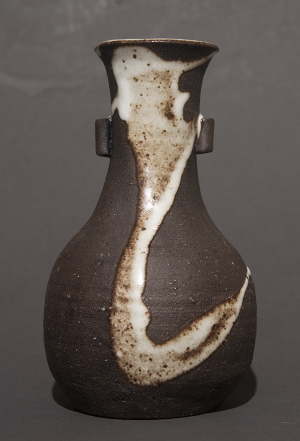
Small vase by Janet Leach

Janet Darnell was born in Grand Saline, Texas, United States, in 1918. Her early years involved moving to New York to work with sculptor Robert M. Cronbach and becoming involved with the Federal Works Art Project. She was briefly married during the Second World War and worked as a welder in a shipyard on Staten Island.

Eventually she started to work with clay and learned to use a potter's wheel. In 1948 she set up a pottery in a Steiner community in Spring Valley. She taught pottery at a mental health hospital in New York.

After meeting Bernard Leach and Shoji Hamada at Black Mountain College, North Carolina, she gained Hamada's agreement to work with him at Mashiko after he had returned to Japan. She travelled there in 1954, by cargo boat. Darnell spent a great deal of time with Bernard Leach and eventually they agreed to marry, initially intending to live in Japan. However, with Bernard's son David Leach leaving the Leach Pottery to establish his own studio, they returned to England in 1956.

Janet Leach's independent spirit ensured that her work was quite different from much of the Leach style. She never felt the need to pay reverence to her husband's work, and could be openly critical of it. In return her own work was not always valued within the St Ives Studio; much of it lay hidden for many years. Clearly influenced by the oriental style and form, her work is free flowing and energetic.

There was a retrospective exhibition of her work in 2006–7 at Tate St Ives.
