= Tim Andrews (potter) =

English studio potter

Tim Andrews is an English studio potter making distinctive smoke-fired and raku ceramics exhibited internationally.

Andrews trained as an apprentice to David Leach and studied at Dartington Pottery Training Workshop before setting up his first studio in 1981. He returned to share the workshop at Lowerdown with David 1986-93 and now has a studio at Woodbury in Devon.

He is a fellow of the Craft Potters Association and has published a number of books on the craft of raku.

His work is found both in public and private collections including: Stoke-on-Trent and Liverpool Museums, Ashmolean Museum, St John's College, Oxford, Donna Karan, New York, Lord Chancellor Lord Irving, Imerys and The Royal Bank of Scotland.

== Bibliography ==
- Andrews, Tim, Raku, (A & C Black Publishers 2005) Ltd ISBN 0713664908
- Andrews, Tim, Raku: A Review of Contemporary Work (Craftsman House 1994) ISBN 976809799X
