= Co-Cathedral of Our Lady of Assumption, Saint-Pierre =

Co-Cathedral of Our Lady of Assumption
- Cathédrale Notre-Dame-de-l'Assomption de Saint-Pierre de la Martinique
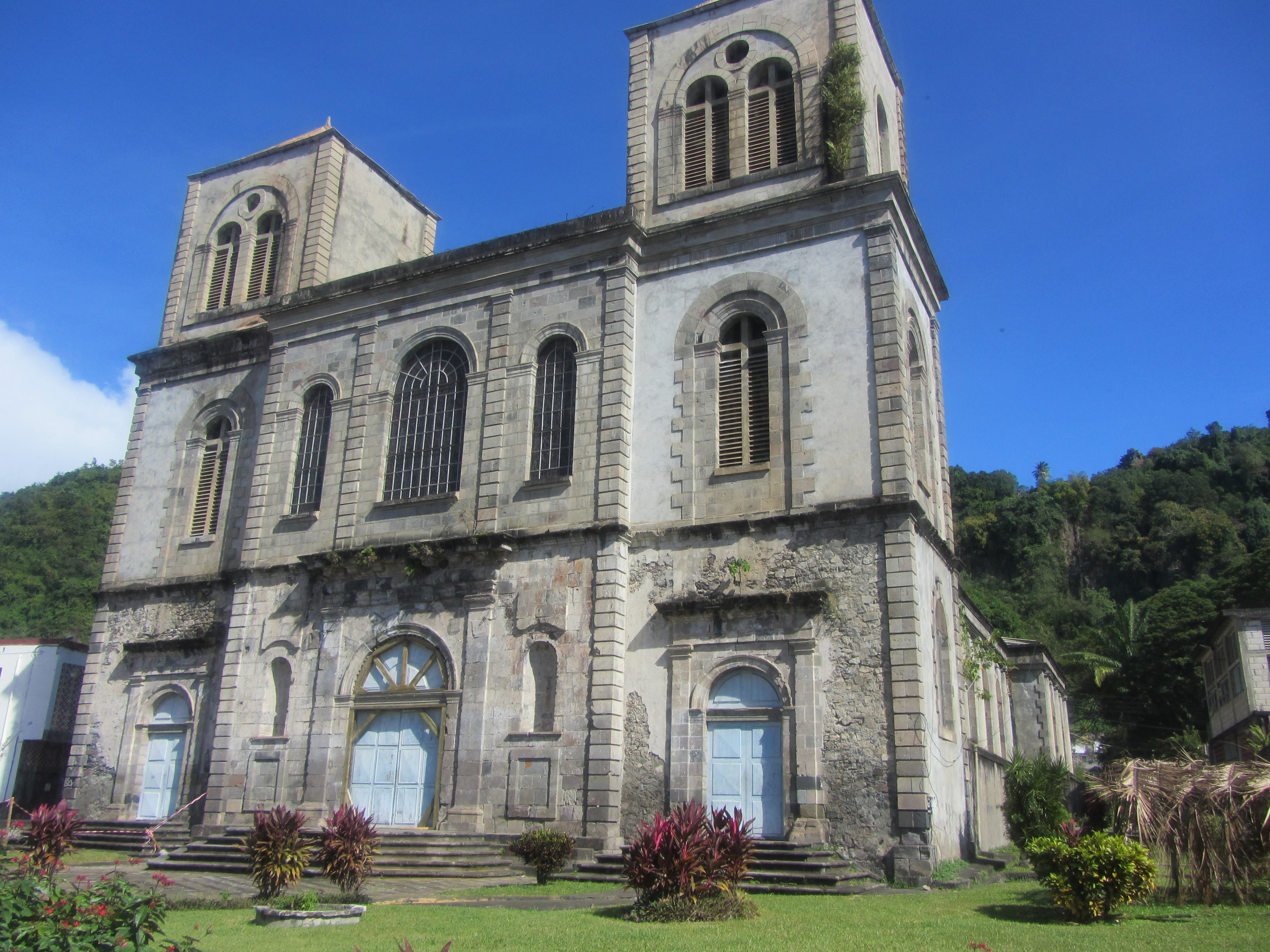
- Co-Cathedral of Our Lady of Assumption
- 14.7405°N 61.1756°W
- Location: Martinique
- Country: France
- Denomination: Roman Catholic Church
- Website: martinique.catholique.fr/824-annuaire-des-paroisses-catholiques-de-martinique-par-commune.htm?view=paroisse&view_id=26

Architecture
- Groundbreaking: 1654
- Completed: 1956

The Co-Cathedral of Our Lady of Assumption (French: Cathédrale Notre-Dame-de-l'Assomption de Saint-Pierre de la Martinique) or simply Cathedral of Our Lady of the Assumption, is the co-cathedral church of the Archdiocese of Fort-de-France, is located in Saint-Pierre, on the island of Martinique, a dependency of France in the Caribbean Sea.

The first church was built in 1654, it was a private chapel and is in the district of Mouillage. The tower of the chapel and the bell were destroyed during a British bombardment of the port of Saint-Pierre, in 1667. In 1675 the reconstruction of the church was proposed.

Notre-Dame-du-Bon-Port was opened in 1859. A new restoration of the main facade was begun in 1861 and neoclassical facade was replaced by a baroque facade. The work concluded with the construction of the two towers of the facade and bell tower in 1885. The building was damaged by the 1902 eruption of Mount Pelée.

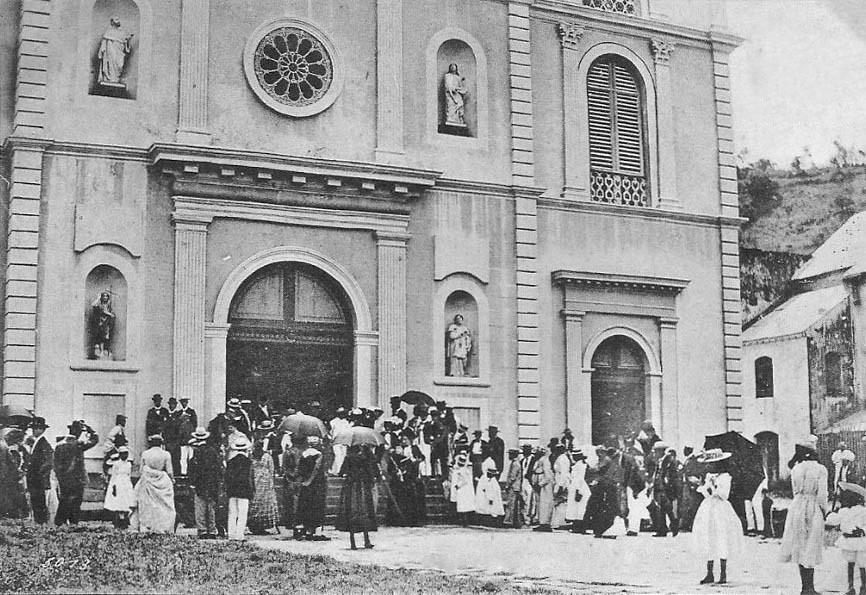
Photo of cathedral taken on the Sunday before the 1902 eruption

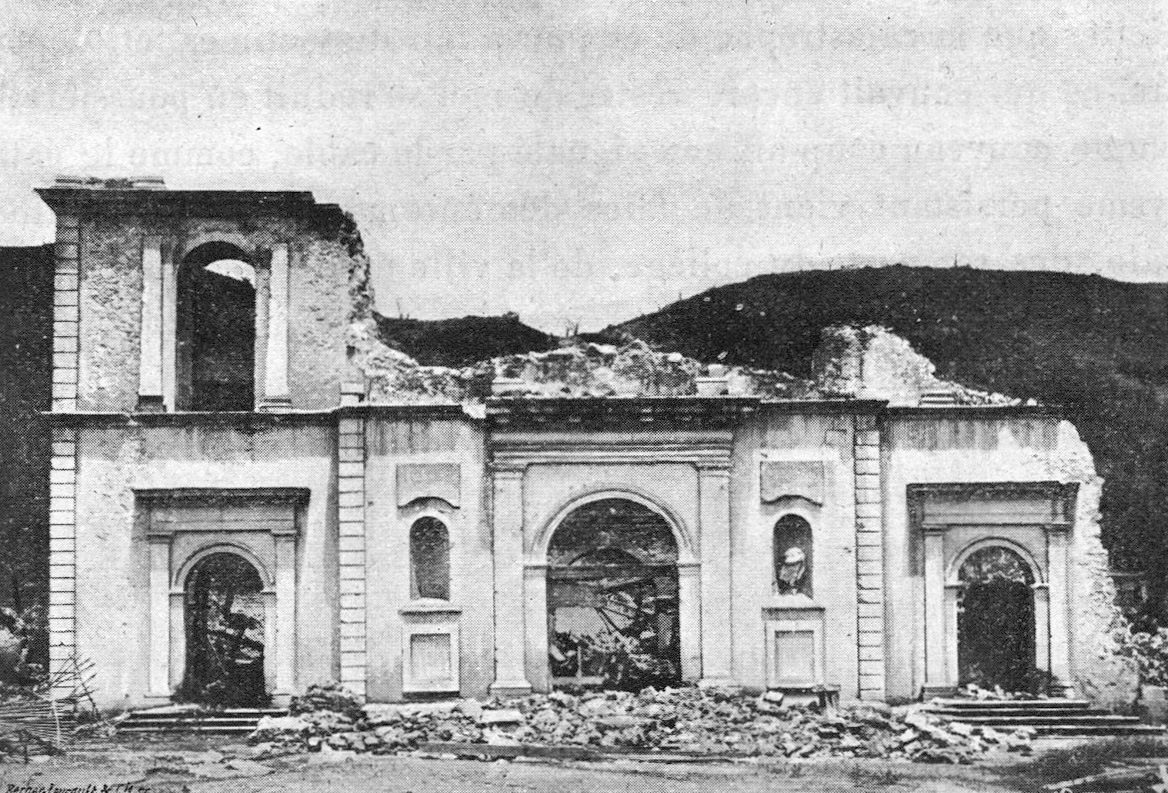
Ruins of the cathedral in 1905, following the 1902 eruption

A new building was built using old stones with the addition of volcanic rocks and bricks. The co-cathedral was dedicated to Our Lady of the Assumption and received new bells in 1925.

== See also ==
- Catholic Church in France
- Co-cathedral
