= Marijka Batterham =

Australian Statistician and Dietitian

Professor Marijka J. Batterham is a multidisciplinary statistician, Director of the National Institute for Applied Statistics Research Australia, and the first dedicated appointment as Director of the Statistical Consulting Centre at the University of Wollongong.

Batterham's educational background spans across multiple disciplines, including statistics, nutrition and dietetics, and biochemistry. She holds a Doctor of Philosophy in Science from the Faculty of Medicine at the University of Sydney, a Master of Medical Statistics from the Centre for Clinical Epidemiology and Biostatistics at the University of Newcastle, and a Master of Science in Nutrition and Dietetics from the University of Wollongong.

As of April 2023, in her position as Coordinator of the Data and Decision Science Initiative, Batterham is responsible for directing and developing the initiative's research, teaching, and industry engagement programs. She holds dual professional qualifications as an Accredited Statistician from Statistical Society of Australia and as an Advanced Accredited Practising Dietitian from Dietitians Australia. Throughout her career, Batterham has published primarily in the areas of statistical methodology, nutrition, and public health, and has a particular research interest in the design and analysis on lifestyle and health related interventions.
