= Byron Temple =

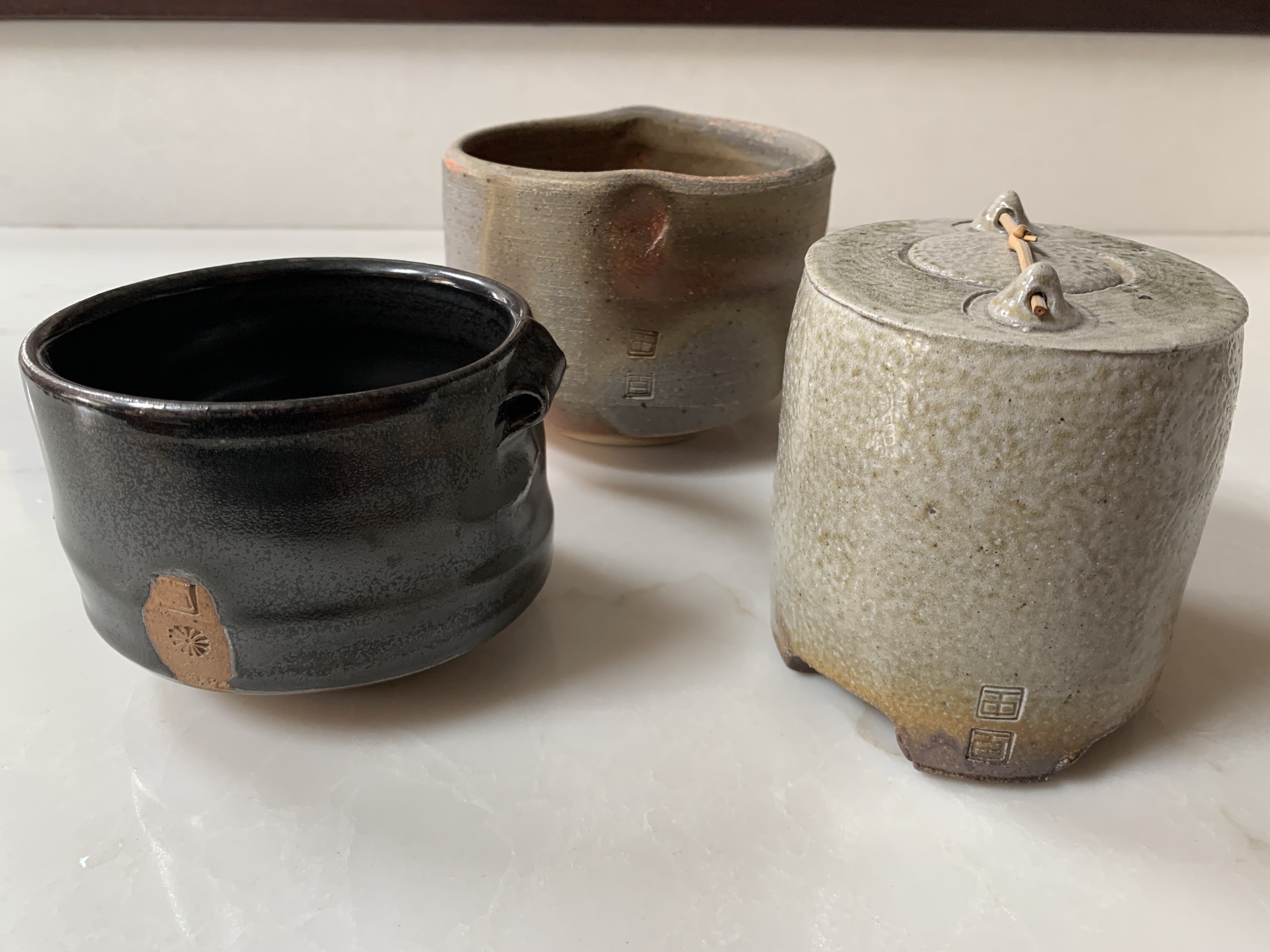
Stoneware vessels by Byron Temple: Glazed bowl with handles (left), Wood-fired bowl (center), Bamboo button jar (right).

Byron Temple (1933–2002) was an American potter.

Temple learned to throw on the wheel at Ball State University as an undergrad in his native Indiana. After college and serving in the U.S. Army, Temple discovered A Potter's Book, written by the English potter, Bernard Leach, considered by many to be the grandfather of modern hand thrown functional studio pottery. This inspiring book motivated Temple to write Leach asking if he could apprentice with him at Leach's St. Ives Pottery in Cornwall, England. The two happened to meet while Leach was giving a workshop in the United States, and he agreed to take on Temple as an apprentice in 1960.

While at St. Ives, Temple worked closely with Leach, not only talking about the aesthetic of pots, but also developing a line of standard ware they produced and sold. Temple's time spent at St. Ives was equivalent to a graduate school education, and he left St. Ives with a philosophy of making well-crafted work as a production potter. Upon Temple's return to the United States in 1962, he settled in Lambertville, New Jersey and began turning out his own line of standard ware. Temple traveled internationally giving workshops, teaching, and sharing his artistic philosophy. In 1986 Temple moved to Kentucky to focus on making one of a kind art pots. These works retained the aesthetic he had developed earlier, but he also experimented with wood and salt firing - exploring more simple yet stately forms by incorporating materials such as cords, bamboo, and metal.
