= Izcuchaca District =

Coordinates: 12.5006°S 74.9973°W

Izcuchaca Iskuchaka
- District
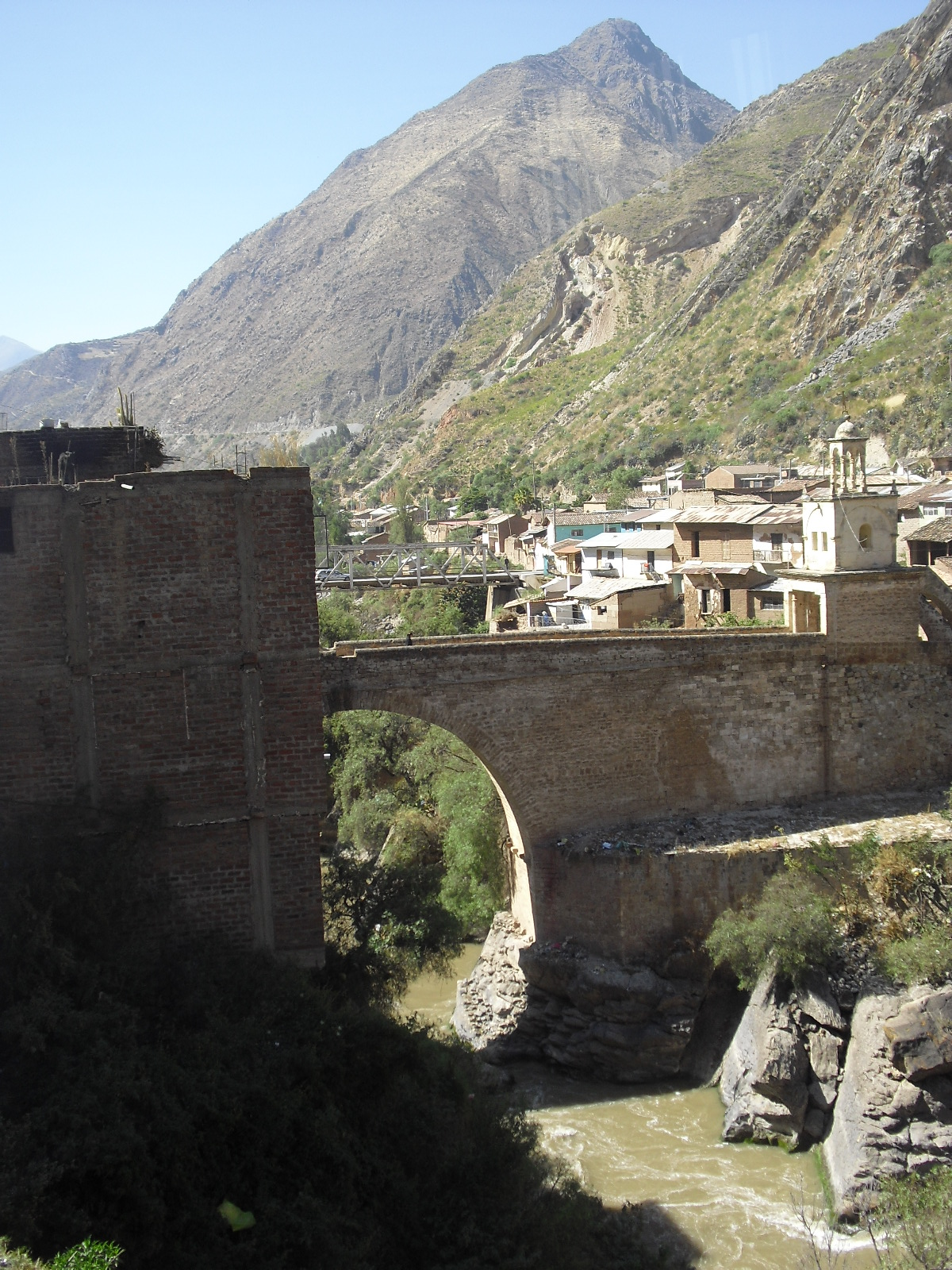
- Bridge of Izcuchaca
- Interactive map of Izcuchaca
- Country: Peru
- Region: Huancavelica
- Province: Huancavelica
- Founded: January 5, 1923
- Capital: Izcuchaca

Government
  - Mayor: Alejandro Miranda Enriquez

Area
  - Total: 12.19 km^{2} (4.71 sq mi)
- Elevation: 2,939 m (9,642 ft)

Population (2005 census)
  - Total: 1,144
  - Density: 93.85/km^{2} (243.1/sq mi)
- Time zone: UTC-5 (PET)
- UBIGEO: 090108

Izcuchaca District is one of nineteen small districts of the province of Huancavelica in Peru.
