= David Leach (potter) =

English studio potter

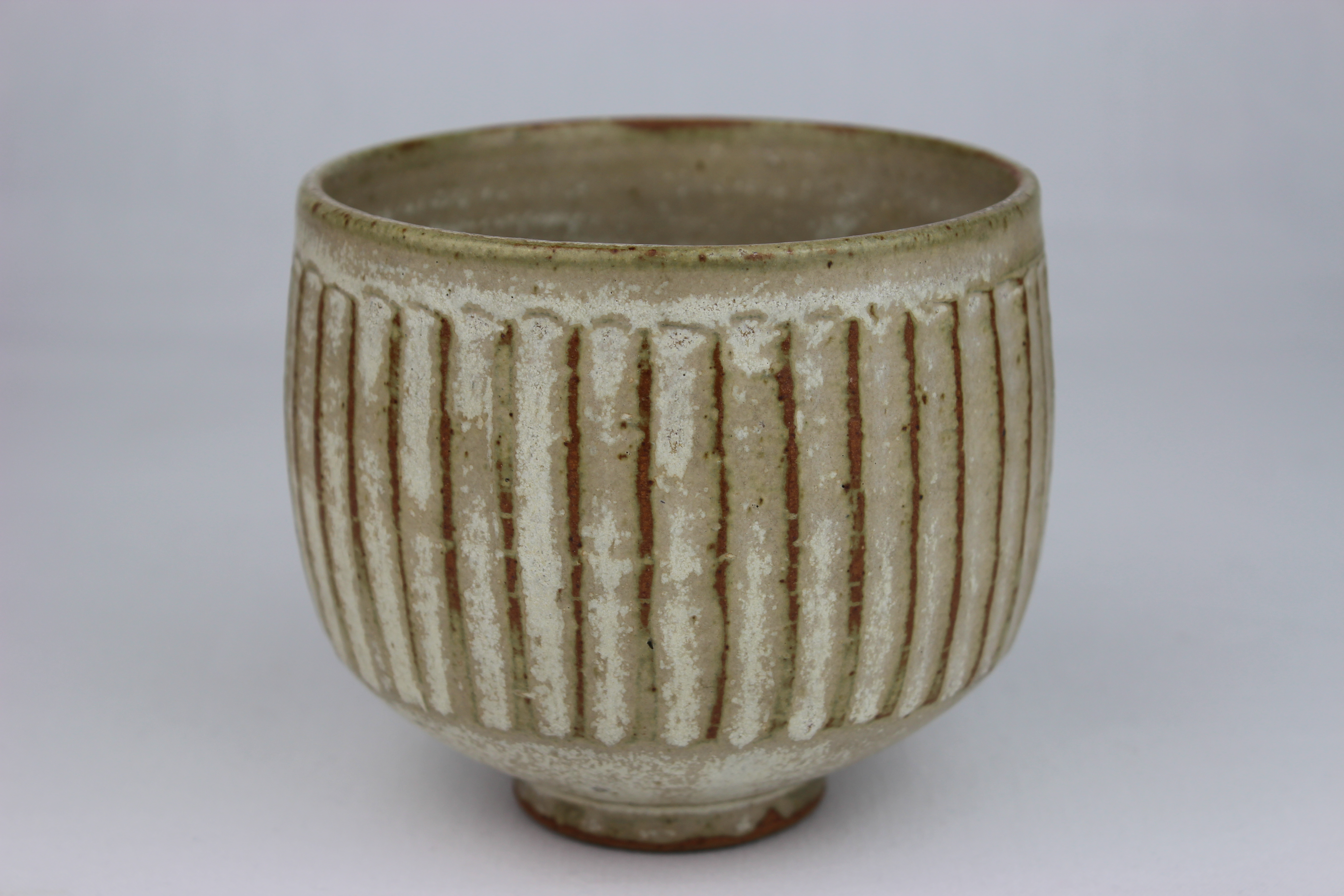
Fluted bowl with cream glaze. From the William Alfred Ismay Collection.

David Andrew Leach (7 May 1911 – 15 February 2005) was an English studio potter and the elder son of Bernard Leach and Muriel Hoyle Leach, Bernard's first wife.

David Leach was born in Tokyo, Japan, where his father met Shoji Hamada, and came to England in 1920 for education at Dauntsey's School, Wiltshire. He began an apprenticeship with his father at the Leach Pottery St Ives, Cornwall, in 1930 and trained as a pottery manager at the North Staffordshire Technical College, Stoke-on-Trent, 1935–1937. He subsequently managed the pottery, changing over from a wood-burning to an oil-burning kiln and modernising the workshop.

During the Second World War Leach became liable to call-up in 1941, but, as a Christian pacifist, expressed his conscientious objection by refusing to don uniform. After two courts-martial, he finally accepted enlistment in the Duke of Cornwall's Light Infantry.

In 1955 Leach left St Ives to set up the Lowerdown Pottery at Bovey Tracey, Devon, where he became known for his porcelain. Christopher Gowing and Paul Rice describe his work: "The style was very close to that of his father, but the difference in their nature made for very different pots. A fluted, celadon bowl by David Leach looks nothing like the same thing made by his father. The Bernard Leach bowl would be thick, bold, rough, opaque with wide fluting and little difference in colour between body and glaze. David Leach's would be thin, smooth, translucent, and with precise, narrow fluting and a wide range of colour – from jade green to 'ying ch'ing' blue – on a white body.”

He was chairman of the Craft Potters Association of Great Britain in 1967 and exhibited widely in the UK as well as New York City, Washington DC, Tokyo, Istanbul, Copenhagen, Rotterdam, Düsseldorf, Heidelberg and Munich. In 1987 he was appointed OBE for his work in studio pottery and his services to education.

His three sons, John, Jeremy, and Simon, all became potters.

== See also ==
- Janet Leach
- Tim Andrews (potter)
