= Leach Pottery =

Pottery and museum in St Ives, Cornwall, United Kingdom

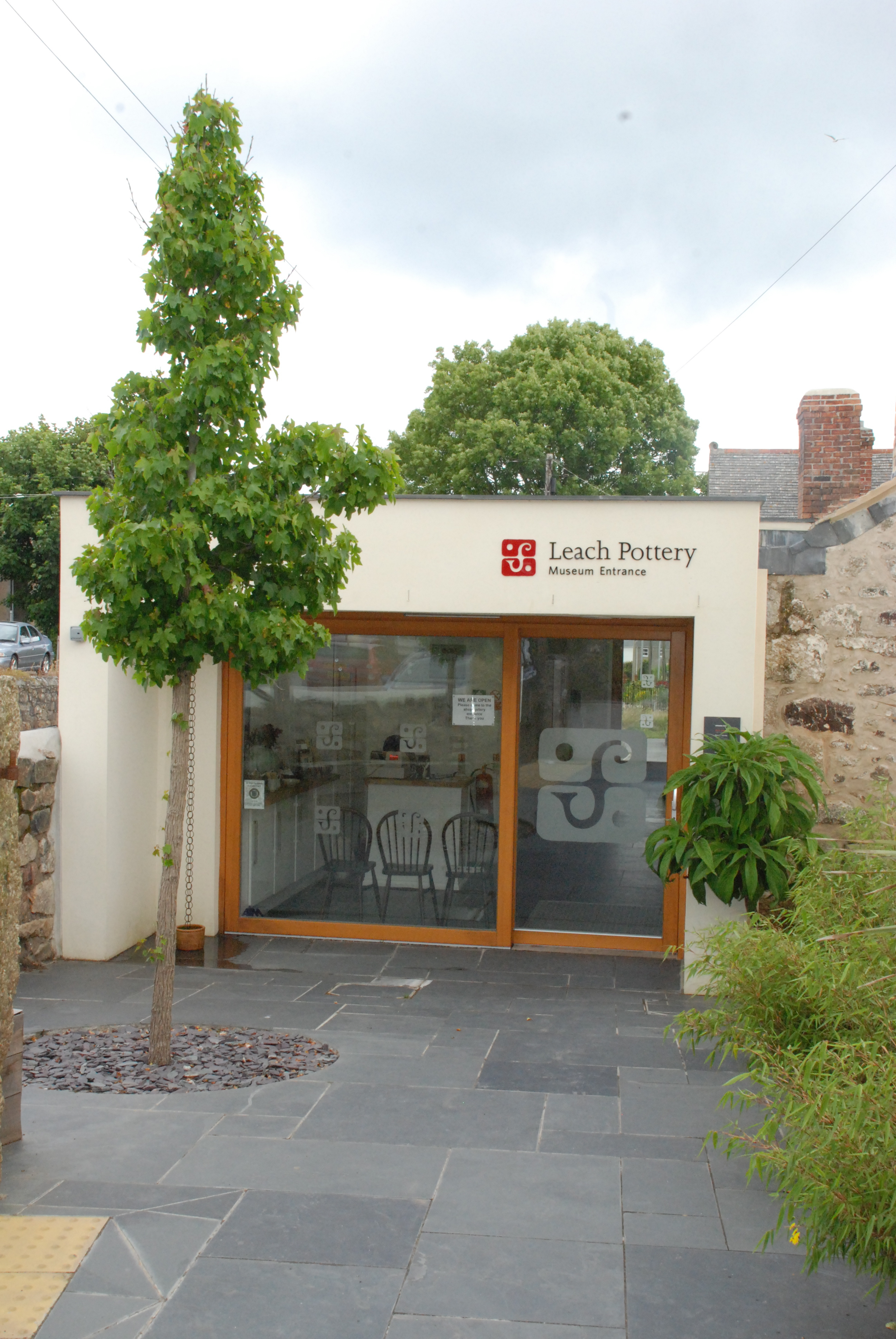
- The Leach Pottery, Museum Entrance
- Established: 1920
- Location: St Ives, Cornwall
- Coordinates: 50.2068°N 5.4931°W
- Founders: Bernard Leach and Shoji Hamada
- Executive director: Libby Buckley
- Website: leachpottery.com

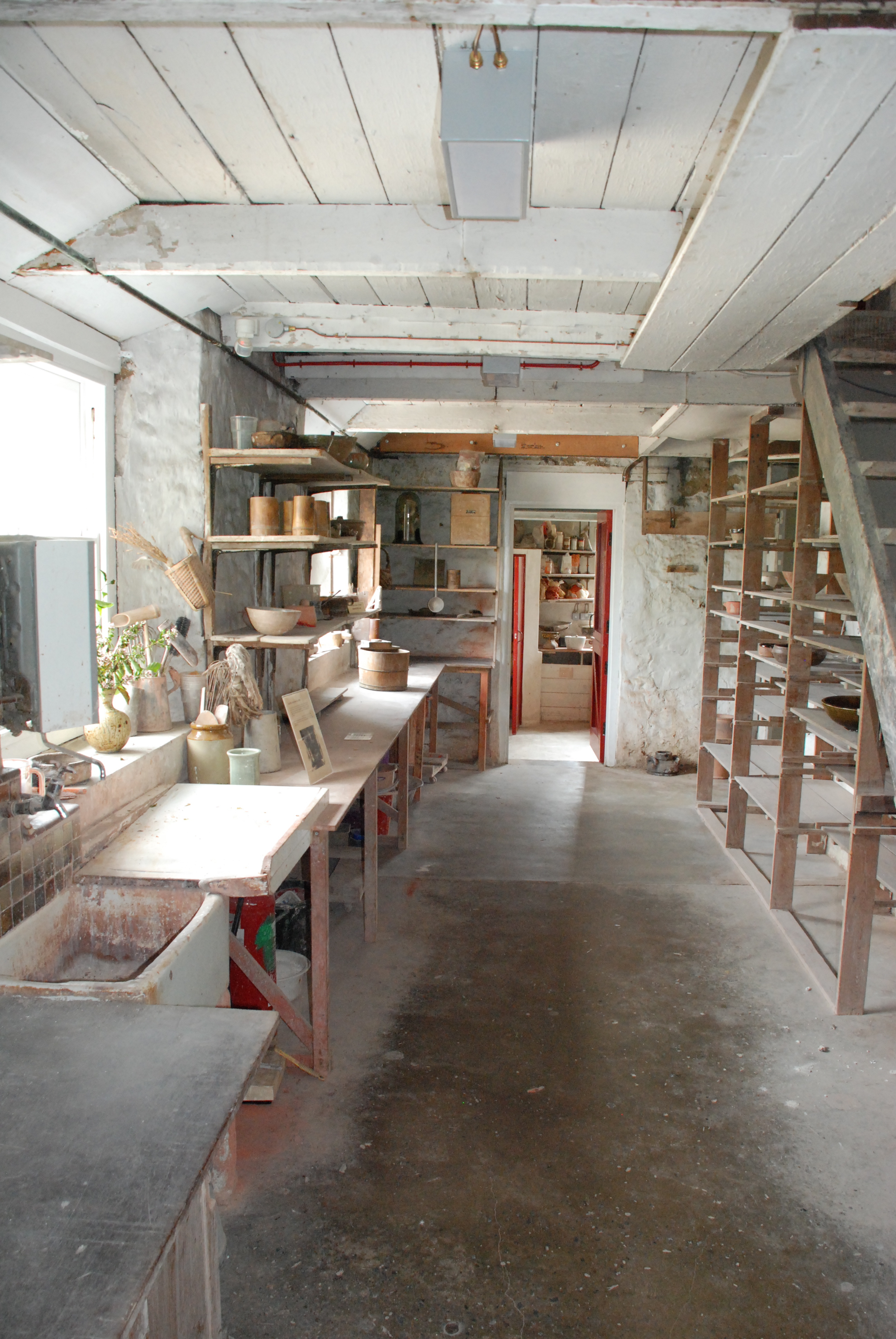
Interior of the Leach Pottery

The Leach Pottery was founded in 1920 by Bernard Leach and Shoji Hamada in St Ives, Cornwall, in the United Kingdom.

The buildings grew from an old cow / tin-ore shed in the 19th century to a pottery in the 1920s with the addition of a two-storey cottage added on to the lower end of the pottery, followed by a completely separate cottage at the top of the site added by Leach in 1927.

In 1922 Tsuronosuke Matsubayashi came from Japan to rebuild an unsuccessful climbing kiln for the pottery. Matsubayashi built a three chambered traditional Japanese Noborigama, the first Japanese climbing kiln in the western world, and this was used until the 1970s.

Bernard's son David Leach who trained at the North Staffordshire Technical College, became manager in 1937 abandoning production of earthenware, developing a new stoneware body and taking on local apprentices. Michael Cardew was an early student and William Marshall an apprentice. Katherine Pleydell-Bouverie became an apprentice in 1924 Warren MacKenzie from the US, Charmian Johnson from Canada and Len Castle from New Zealand also worked here.

The pottery's Standard Ware was first issued in 1946 and can be found in the V&A collection. Mail order catalogues were distributed and the range was produced until 1979. Three basic glazes were used for the ware: Celadon, Tenmoku and oatmeal with overpainting in brown and blue.

After Bernard's death in 1979, his wife Janet Leach stopped production of standard ware to concentrate on her own pots until her death in 1997, after which the pottery was purchased by Alan Gillam. The property was acquired by Penwith District Council as part of the Leach Restoration Project

The site was renovated and restored in 2005-08 before being reopened to the public in March 2008 as a working studio pottery, museum and gallery. The restoration cost £1.7 million which preserved the original buildings whilst adding an exhibition space and shop. It is now managed by the Bernard Leach (St Ives) Trust Limited, a registered UK charity founded in 2005.

There are two exhibition areas, the Entrance Gallery with work by Bernard Leach, Janet Leach, David Leach, Shoji Hamada, William Marshall, Michael Cardew, and Kenneth Quick and the Cube Gallery with a changing exhibition.

The Leach Pottery's director is Libby Buckley and the lead potter is Roelof Uys.
