= Bernard Leach =

British studio potter (1887–1979)

Bernard Leach CH CBE
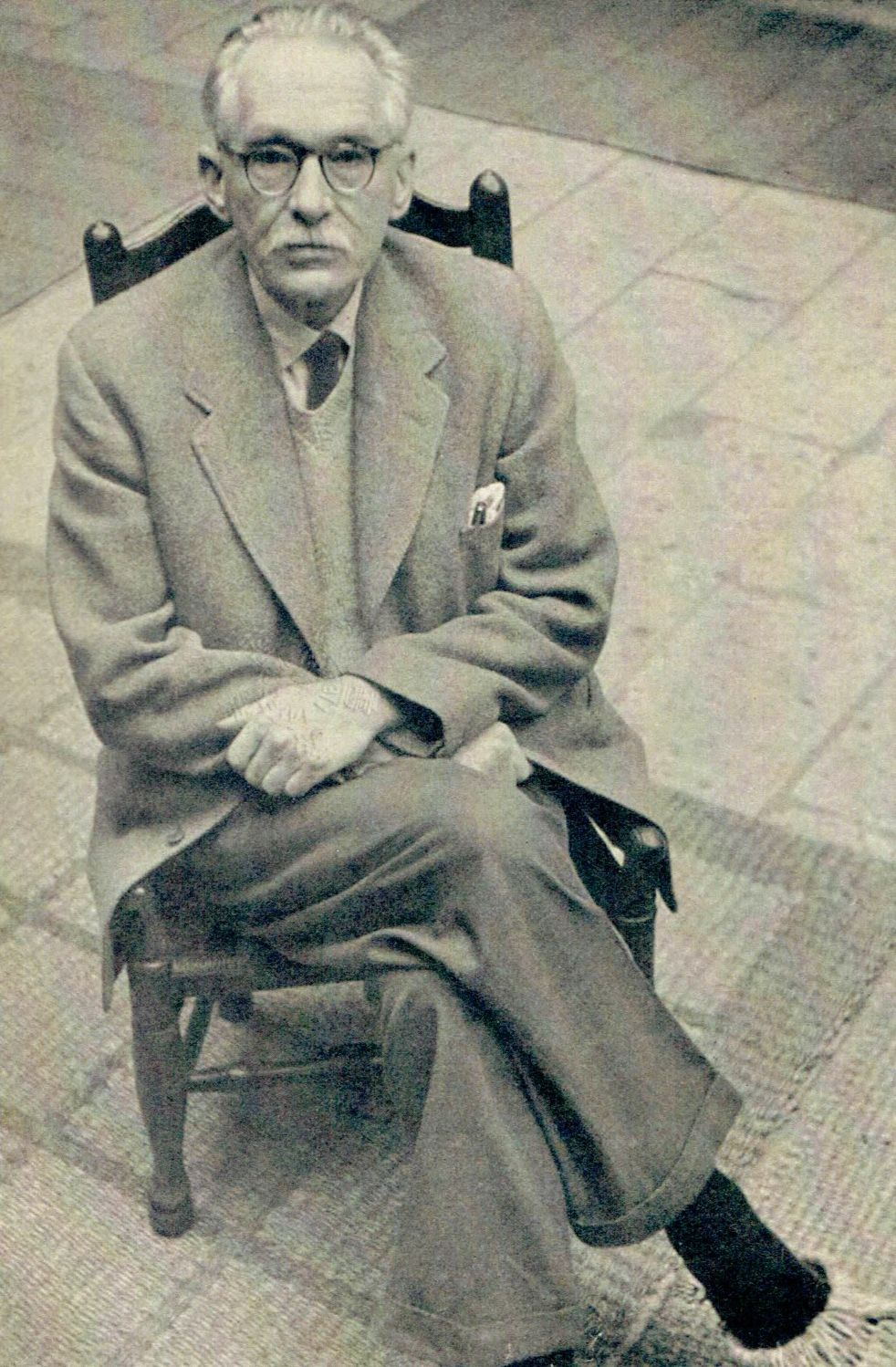
- Photographed in 1953
- Born: 5 January 1887; Hong Kong
- Died: 6 May 1979 (aged 92)
- Education: Slade School of Fine Art; London School of Art
- Known for: Studio pottery
- Spouses: Muriel Hoyle (m. 1909; sep. 1935) Laurie Cookes (m. 1944; div. 1956) Janet Darnell (m. 1955)
- Children: David Leach

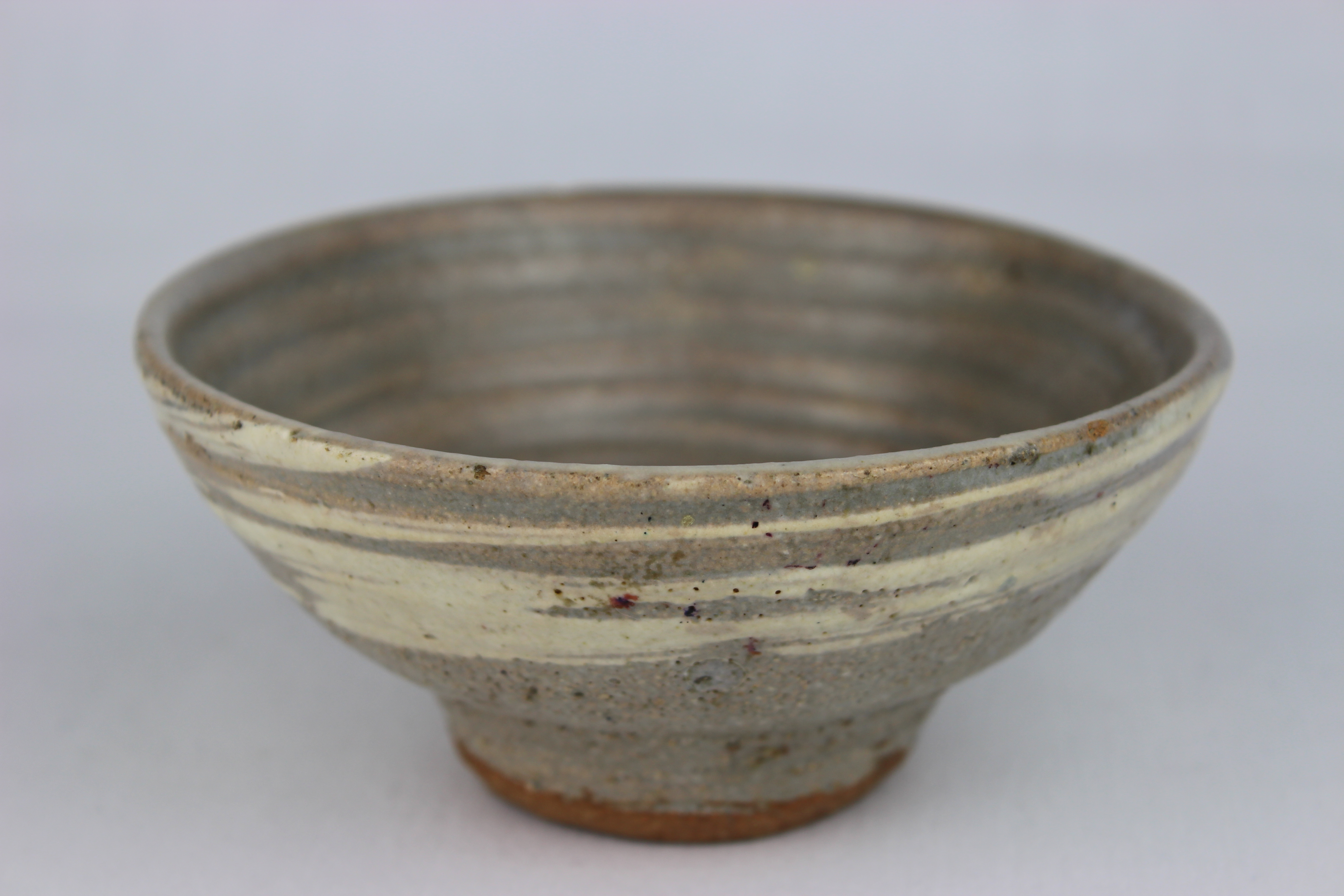
Thrown bowl by Leach

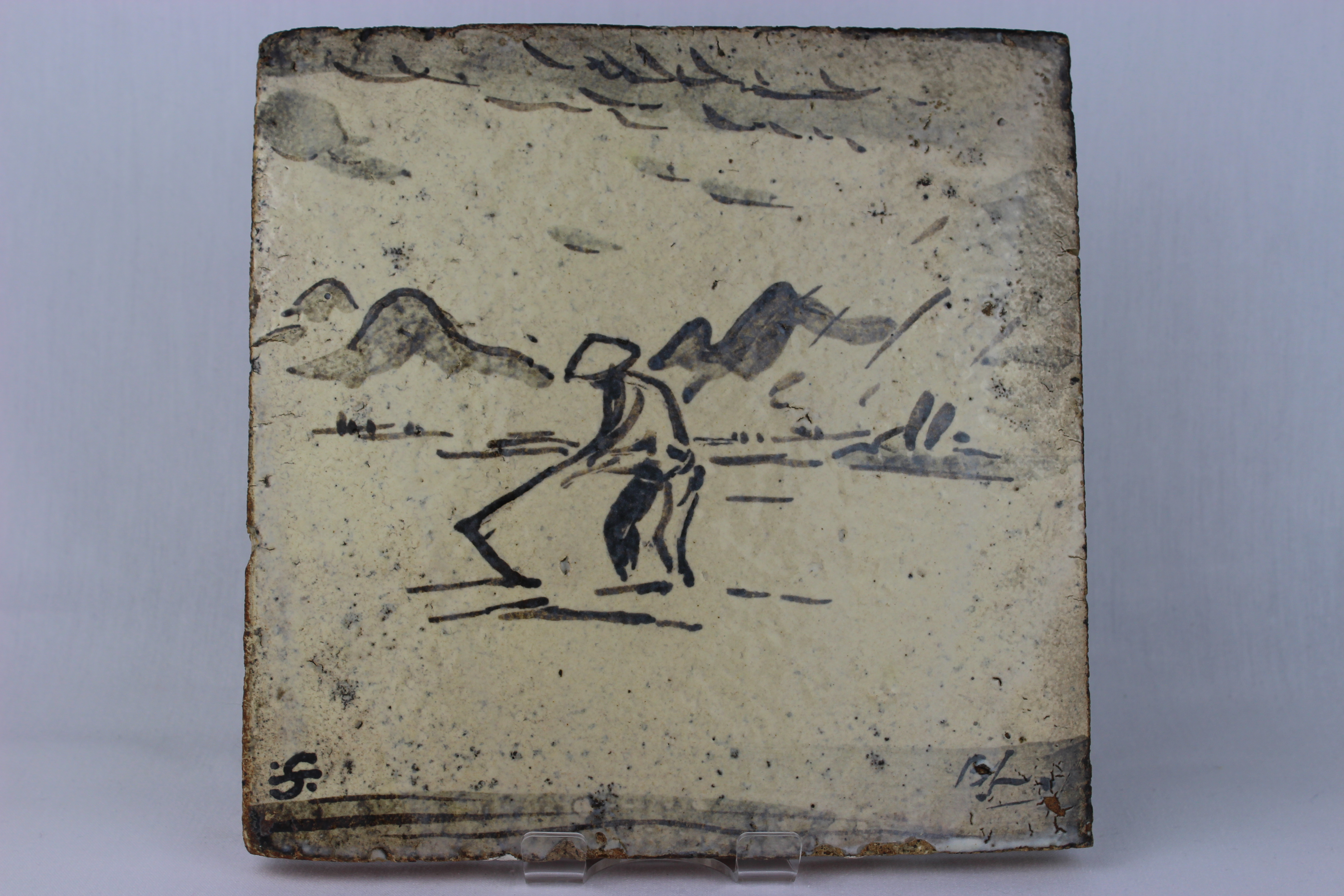
Hand-built decorative tile by Leach

Bernard Howell Leach CH CBE (5 January 1887 – 6 May 1979) was a British studio potter and art teacher. He is regarded as the "Father of British studio pottery".

== Biography ==
=== Early years (Japan) ===
Leach was born in Hong Kong. His mother Eleanor (née Sharp) died in childbirth. He spent his first three years in Japan with his father, Andrew Leach, until he moved back to Hong Kong in 1890.

Leach attended the Slade School of Fine Art and the London School of Art, where he studied etching under Frank Brangwyn. Reading books by Lafcadio Hearn, he became interested in Japan. In 1909 he returned to Japan with his young wife Muriel (née Hoyle) intending to teach etching. Satomi Ton, Kojima Kikuo, and later Ryūsei Kishida were his pupils.

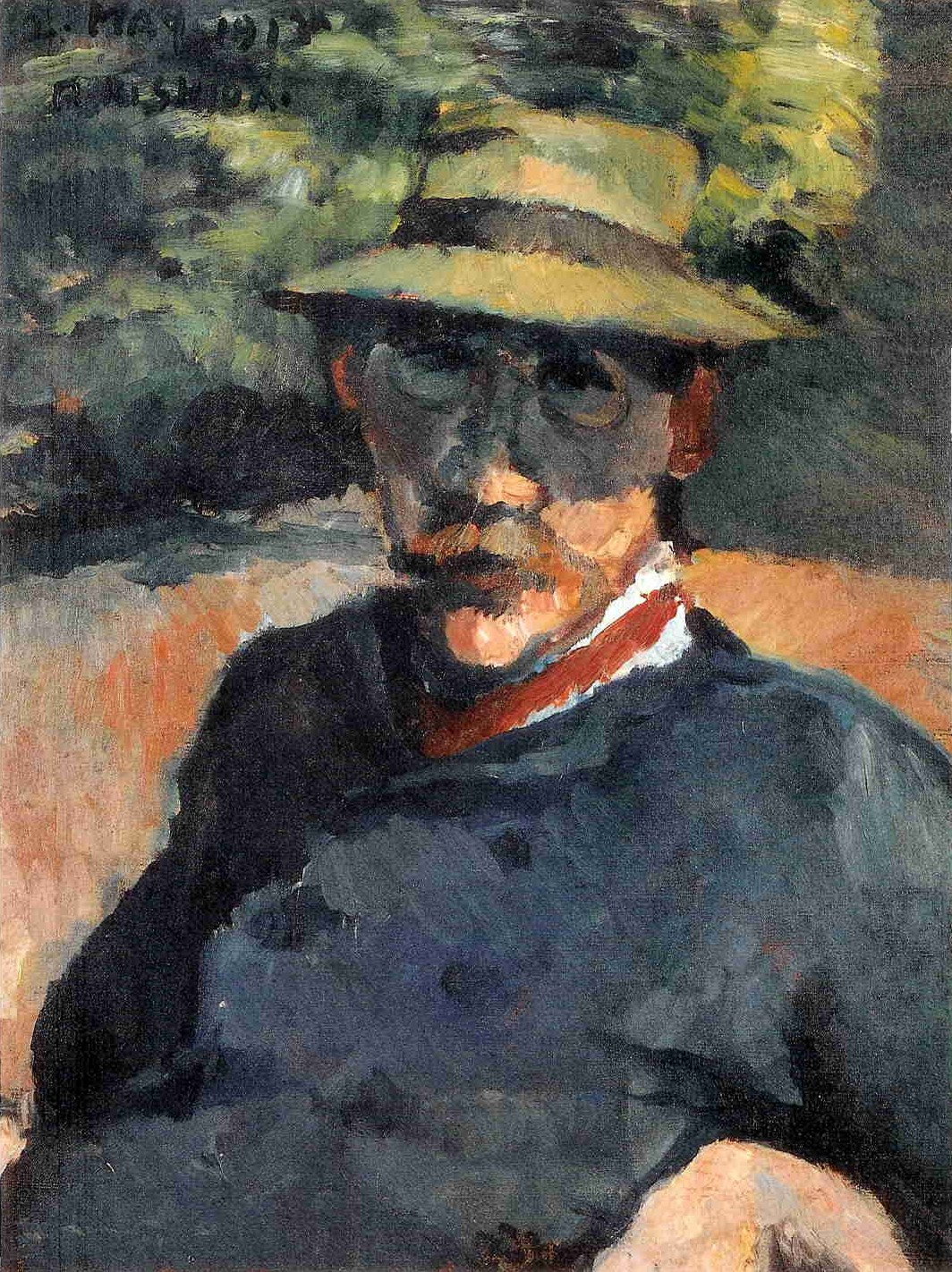
Bernard Leach, painted by Ryūsei Kishida

In Tokyo, he gave talks and attended meetings along with Mushanokōji Saneatsu, Shiga Naoya, Yanagi Sōetsu and others from the "Shirakaba-Group", (Note: Shirakaba ="The Birch" (白樺) was an influential cultural magazine at that time.) who were trying to introduce western art to Japan after 250 years of seclusion. About 1911 he attended a Raku-yaki pottery party which was his first introduction to ceramics, and through introduction by Ishii Hakutei, he began to study under Urano Shigekichi 浦野繁吉 (1851–1923), who stood as Kenzan 6th in the tradition of potter Ogata Kenzan (1663–1743). Assisting as interpreter for technical terms was the potter Tomimoto Kenkichi, whom he had met earlier. From this time Leach wrote articles for the Shirakaba.

In 1913 he also drafted covers for Shirakaba and Fyūzan. (Note: A cultural magazine. Fyūzan = French fusain, charcoal pencil.) Attracted by the Prussian philosopher and art scholar Alfred Westharp, who at the time was living in Peking, Leach moved to Peking in 1915. There he took on the Name 李奇聞 (for "Leach"), but returned the following year to Japan. It was the year 1919, when young Hamada Shōji visited Leach for the first time. Leach received a kiln from Kenzan and built it up in Yanagi's garden and called it Tōmon-gama. Now established as a potter, he decided to move to England.

In 1920, before leaving, he had an exhibition in Osaka, where he met the potter Kawai Kanjirō. In Tokyo, a farewell exhibition was organized.

=== Back in England ===
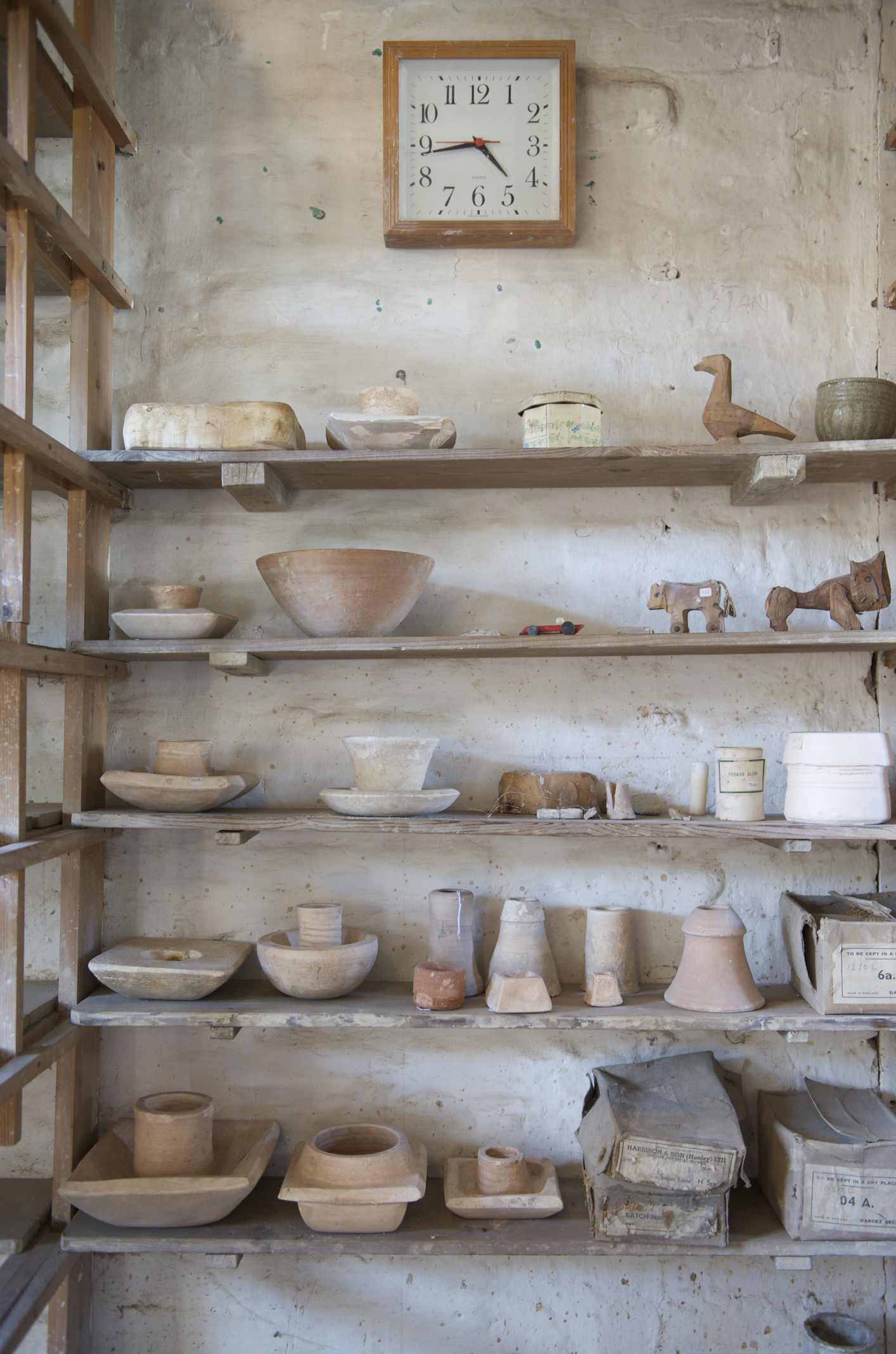
A shelf in the Leach Pottery museum and gallery, St Ives, Cornwall

Leach returned to England in 1920 on the invitation of Frances Horne. Horne was establishing a Guild of Handicrafts within the existing artist colony of St Ives in Cornwall. On the recommendation of a family friend, Edgar Skinner, she contacted Leach to suggest that he become the potter within this group. Leach and his wife Muriel were accompanied by the young Hamada Shoji and, having identified a suitable site next to the Stennack river on the outskirts of St Ives, the two established the Leach Pottery in 1920. They constructed a traditional Japanese climbing kiln or 'Noborigama (登り窯)', the first built in the West. The kiln was poorly built and was reconstructed in 1923 by Matsubayashi Tsurunosuke (1894-1932).

In 1934, Leach and Mark Tobey travelled together through France and Italy, then sailed from Naples to Hong Kong and Shanghai, where they parted company, Leach heading on to Japan.

Leach formally joined the Baháʼí Faith in 1940 after being introduced to it by Mark Tobey, who was himself a Baháʼí. A pilgrimage to the Baháʼí shrines in Haifa, Israel, during 1954 intensified his feeling that he should do more to unite the East and West by returning to the Orient "to try more honestly to do my work there as a Baháʼí and as an artist..."

Leach promoted pottery as a combination of Western and Eastern arts and philosophies. His work focused on traditional Korean, Japanese and Chinese pottery, in combination with traditional techniques from England and Germany, such as slipware and salt glaze ware. He saw pottery as a combination of art, philosophy, design and craft – even as a greater lifestyle. A Potter's Book (1940) defined Leach's craft philosophy and techniques; it went through many editions and was his breakthrough to recognition.

=== Midlife ===
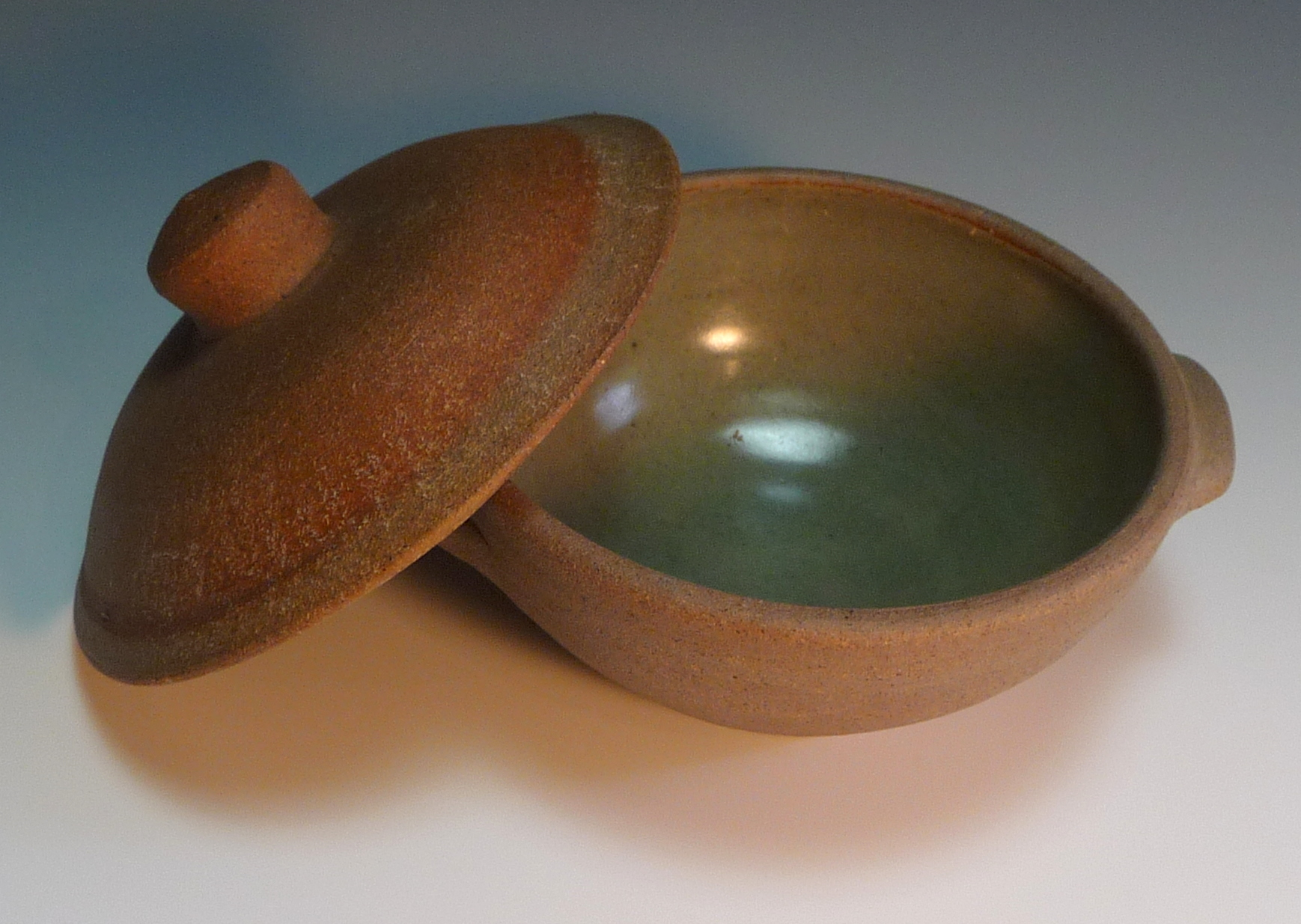
Leach Pottery covered soup bowl

Leach advocated simple and utilitarian forms. His ethical pots stand in opposition to what he called fine art pots, which promoted aesthetic concerns rather than function. Popularised in the 1940s after the publication of A Potter's Book, his style had lasting influence on counter-culture and modern design in North America during the 1950s and 1960s. Leach's pottery produced a range of "standard ware" handmade pottery for the general public. He continued to produce pots which were exhibited as works of art.

=== Later years ===
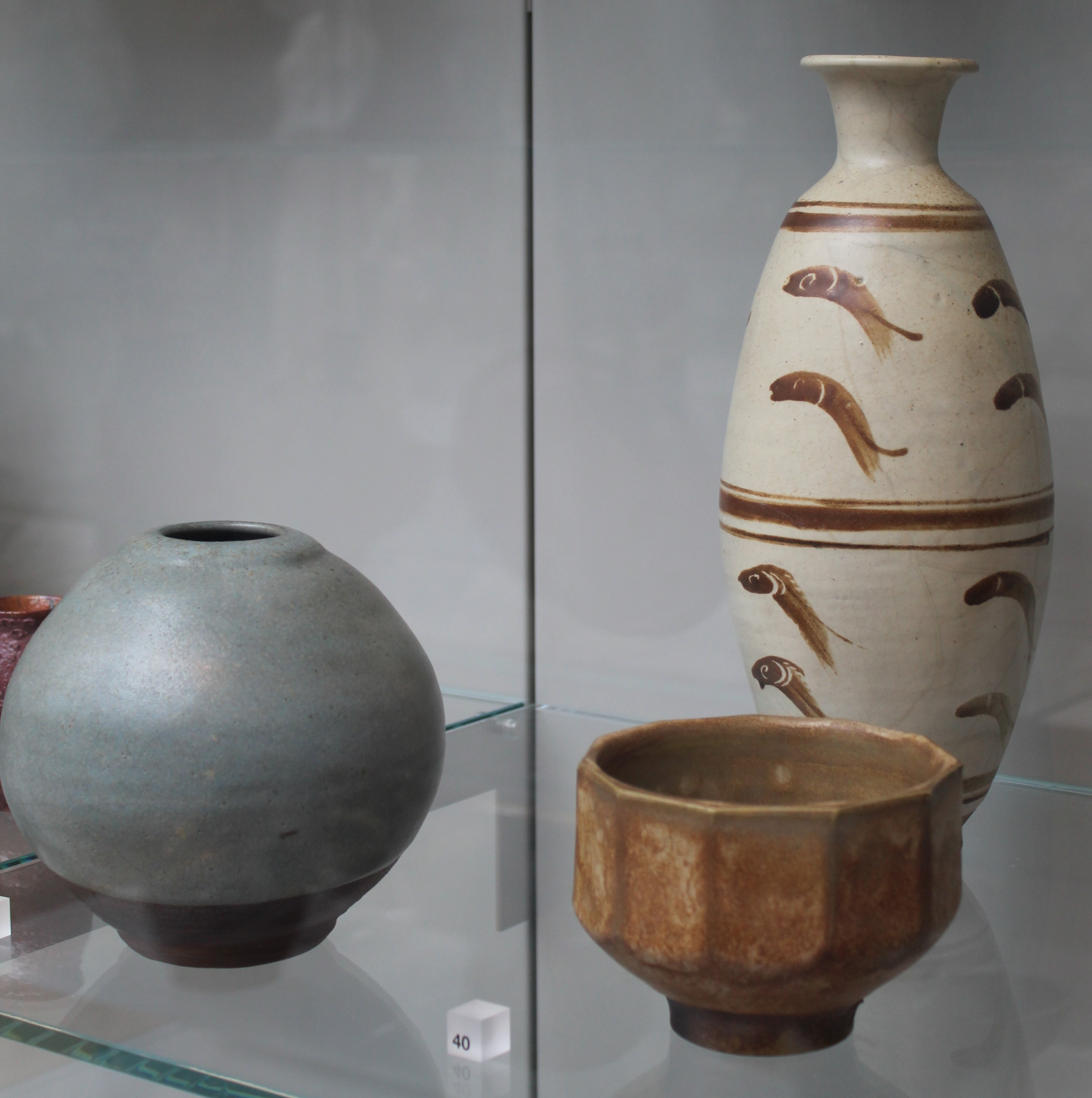
Three works by Leach, Victoria and Albert Museum, London

Bernard Leach Pottery's New Learning and Production Centre, St Ives, Cornwall (front view), October 2026

Leach continued to produce work until 1972 and never ended his passion for travelling. He continued to write about ceramics even after losing his eyesight.

The Victoria and Albert Museum in London held a major exhibition of Leach's art in 1977 to mark his ninetieth birthday. On display were 200 pots, prints and drawings, many illustrated with Leach's familiar motifs, the willow, tree of life, bird, fish, leaf or hare and the human figure, usually set against an Oriental background. Carol Hogben, who curated the exhibition, wrote "There is room of course, for an infinite number of opinions as to who is the finest potter of our age, but there cannot be two views as to which has had the greatest influence." The exhibition was very well received. The art critic Waldemar Januszczak wrote how the exhibition balanced deep respect for Leach's Eastern-Western philosophies against the evolution of modern craft. The Times, coverage similarly assessed Leach's towering legacy and his role in establishing the Mingei (folk art) movement in the UK.

The Leach Pottery remains in operation, accompanied by a museum displaying many pieces by Leach and his students.

== Legacy ==
Many potters from all over the world were apprenticed at the Leach Pottery, and spread Leach's style and beliefs. His British associates and trainees include Michael Cardew, Katherine Pleydell-Bouverie, David Leach (his son), Janet Darnell (whom Leach married in 1956) and William Marshall. Another of his students at St Ives was William Worrall who became chief craftsman at the Chalice Well crafts guild in Glastonbury and Muriel Bell, co-founder of the Lanchester Marionettes. His American apprentices include Warren MacKenzie (who likewise influenced many potters through his teaching at the University of Minnesota), Byron Temple. He was a major influence on New Zealand potter Len Castle who travelled to London to spend time working with him in the mid-1950s. Another apprentice was an Indian potter Nirmala Patwardhan who developed the so-called Nirmala glaze based on an 11th-century Chinese technique. His four Canadian apprentices, John Reeve, Glenn Lewis, Michael Henry and Ian Steele helped to shape the pottery scene in Vancouver and the Canadian west coast during the 1960 and 1970s. The Cypriot potter Valentinos Charalambous trained with Leach in 1950-51.

Leach was instrumental, with Muriel Rose, in organising the only International Conference of Potters and Weavers in July 1952 at Dartington Hall, where he had been working and teaching. It included exhibitions of British pottery and textiles since 1920, Mexican folk art, and works by conference participants, among them Shoji Hamada and US-based Bauhaus potter Marguerite Wildenhain. Another important contributor was Japanese aesthetician Soetsu Yanagi, author of The Unknown Craftsman. According to Brent Johnson, "The most important outcome of the conference was that it helped organize the modern studio pottery movement by giving a voice to the people who became its leaders...it gave them [Leach, Hamada and Yanagi] celebrity status...[while] Marguerite Wildenhain emerged from Dartington Hall as the most important craft potter in America." He was an active member of the Red Rose Guild.

Leach was an influential participant in the Pottery seminar at Black Mountain College in 1952, attended by many younger and later prominent potters.

=== Archive film ===
In 1953, a BBC film appeared, which has been widely attributed to Leach. His high profile on early British television led to frequent confusion with the BBC's famous 1953 Potter's Wheel interlude film. Although the hands show endlessly shaping of the clay, the hands actually belonged to the French-born craftsman Georges Aubertin. Nonetheless, the film is of the period and provides an insight into throwing techniques, which remain unchanged to this day.

Several archival films record Leach demonstrating wheel-throwing and studio techniques at St Ives. In 1952, he was filmed at work in his studio for the documentary The Leach Pottery, later digitally restored by the Mingei Film Archive. In 1961, the BBC broadcast A Potter's World, a documentary directed by John Read featuring Leach throwing, decorating, and discussing his philosophy of craft. Earlier 16mm silent reels from the 1920s and 1930s, documenting clay preparation and early studio production at St Ives, are preserved by Screen Archive South East.

== Honours ==
- Charles Fergus Binns Medal for Excellence in Ceramics, 1950
- Japan Foundation Cultural Award, 1974
- Member of the Order of the Companions of Honour, 1973 (UK)
- Order of the Sacred Treasure, 1966 (Japan)
- Commander of the Order of the British Empire, 1962

== Edmund de Waal's book ==
Edmund de Waal, British ceramic artist and writer, was apprenticed to the potter Geoffrey Whiting, a disciple of Leach, at the King's School, Canterbury in the early 1980s. He has said that to move on, he had to address Leach directly. "It's anxiety of influence – you choose which father to kill, and in my case it was Leach." He researched Leach's papers and journals in the archive room of the Japanese Folk Crafts Museum.

De Waal's book, the first critical monograph on Leach, was published in 1998. He described it as "the first 'de-mystifying' study of Leach", writing in the last chapter: "In the West, Leach has been seen as 'a natural child of the East', someone who 'understood' Japan by birthright and in an almost mystical way. In the East, he has been credited with seeing deeper into the culture of Japan than any Westerner since Lafcadio Hearn".

Studying the circumstances of his grounding in Japanese culture, he pointed out that Leach could "barely speak" Japanese at the time of his training with Kenzan VI. De Waal also notes that poetry used in the tradition of Kenzan I would not be legible to Leach, who would straightforwardly say that he could not read Japanese texts. Leach did learn to speak the language to a conversational standard, however; recordings of this are held by the Mingei Film Archive and the Crafts Study Centre, Farnham. The book acknowledges Leach's strength as an artist, his sophisticated mark-making and sensitivity to the surface qualities of the clay, while providing an examination of the Orientalism in his thinking and making.

== Writings (selected) ==
- 1940: A Potter's Book. London: Faber and Faber
  - New edition, with introductions by Soyetsu Yanagi and Michael Cardew. London: Faber and Faber, 1976, ISBN 978-0-571-10973-9
- 1978: Beyond East and West: Memoirs, Portraits and Essays. London: Faber and Faber
  - New edition, London: Faber and Faber, ISBN 978-0-571-11692-8
- 1988: Drawings, Verse & Belief Oneworld Publications; 3rd edition, ISBN 978-1-85168-012-2

== See also ==
- Sardar Gurcharan Singh
